= L.N. Crim =

American politician (1900–1989)

4th Mayor of Kilgore
- In office 1957–1961
- Preceded by: Eugene C. Elder
- Succeeded by: Foster Trammell Bean

Personal details
- Born: Liggett Nicholas Crim; January 21, 1900 Kilgore, Texas, U.S.
- Died: February 3, 1989 (aged 89) Kilgore, Texas, U.S.
- Resting place: Laird Hill
- Spouse: Johnnie Ruth Elder (m. 1921)
- Relations: Malcolm Crim (brother)
- Children: Liggett N. Crim Jr., Camie Del Crim
- Parents: William Riley Crim (father); Lou Della Thompson/Crim (mother)
- Occupation: Businessman, theater owner, politician
- Known for: Crim Theater ownership; civic leadership during Kilgore's development

Liggett Nicholas Crim Sr. (January 21, 1900 – February 3, 1989), commonly known as L.N. Crim, was an American businessman, theater owner, and politician who served as the fourth mayor of Kilgore, Texas from 1957 to 1961. A prominent member of Kilgore's influential Crim family, he was the younger brother of Malcolm Crim, the city's first mayor during the transformative East Texas oil boom. L.N. Crim was an executive in the East Texas Theaters chain and owned Kilgore's notable Crim Theater, playing a significant role in the city's cultural and economic life during the mid-20th century. His tenure as mayor came during a period of stabilization and modernization for the city as it matured beyond its turbulent oil boom origins.

== Early life and family ==
Liggett Nicholas Crim Sr. was born on January 21, 1900, in Kilgore, Texas, to William Riley Crim and Lou Della (Thompson) Crim, who were among the early settler families in Kilgore, Texas. The Crim family established a significant commercial and residential presence in Kilgore, owning multiple downtown properties including the Crim National Bank and the Crim Mercantile Store. His mother, Lou Della Crim, owned the land where the discovery well confirming the extension of the East Texas Oil Field into Kilgore was drilled in 1930. L.N. grew up alongside his brother John Malcolm Crim in a family deeply embedded in the community's foundation. The family maintained two historic residences in Kilgore: the Dean Keener Crim Home (c. 1876), the city's oldest surviving structure, and the Lou Della Crim House (1920).

The Crims were also connected to the Mount Tabor Indian Community through L.N.'s maternal uncle, John Martin Thompson, whose wife was linked to prominent Cherokee families. This heritage positioned the family as cultural intermediaries in East Texas. In 1915, L.N. married Elizabeth "Bess" Johnson. Smith.

== Business career ==
Following the discovery of the East Texas Oil Field on his family's property, which triggered Kilgore's explosive growth, L.N. Crim became a key figure in the local entertainment business. He had been involved in the movie business in Kilgore since 1920. Crim was an executive in the East Texas Theaters chain, which operated eighty movie houses in the region. His most notable enterprise was the Crim Theater in downtown Kilgore, the flagship of the theater chain.

Designed by architects Fred Stone and Llewellyn Pitts, the 1,000-seat Crim Theater opened in 1939 with a streamlined Moderne design. It was a major cultural institution in Kilgore, representing stability and community refinement in contrast to the many temporary and rougher venues of the boom era. The theater's lavish interiors were designed in collaboration with theater designer Lee Kyburz. Crim also owned the Texan Theater, another significant movie house in Kilgore. The Crim Theater closed in the mid-1960s, and both theaters later became the focus of preservation efforts by the Kilgore Historical Preservation Foundation.

== Mayoral tenure (1957–1961) ==
L.N. Crim announced his candidacy for mayor in March 1957 and was elected, succeeding Eugene C. Elder. His administration governed during a period of civic maturation. While his brother Malcolm's mayoralty in the early 1930s dealt with the chaos of the oil boom and the imposition of martial law, L.N.'s tenure focused on guiding a more established city. He was known as an accessible and popular civic leader, owing to his deep roots in the community and his visible role as a downtown businessman. In 1961, Crim was succeeded by Foster Trammell Bean.

== Personal life and legacy ==
Crim was a lifelong resident of the Kilgore area. He died on February 3, 1989, at the age of 89.

His legacy is tied to both his family's foundational role in Kilgore and his own contributions to its cultural and civic life. The Crim Theater, though no longer operational, remains a significant architectural landmark in downtown Kilgore, a testament to his influence on the city's entertainment landscape. The building is a subject of ongoing restoration discussions by the Kilgore Historical Preservation Foundation (KHPF). The KHPF also preserves the two historic Crim family homes, recognizing the family's multigenerational impact on the city's development from its founding through the oil boom and into the modern era.

== See also ==
- History of Kilgore
