= Malcolm Crim =

First Mayor of Kilgore

1st Mayor of Kilgore
- In office 1931–1933
- Succeeded by: Roy H. Laird

City Commissioner
- Incumbent
- Assumed office 1933 (candidate)

Personal details
- Born: John Malcolm Crim; April 6, 1886 Rusk County, Texas, U.S.
- Died: June 5, 1971 Tyler, Texas, U.S.
- Spouse: Kati-Mai Bridwell/Crim
- Relations: L. N. Crim (brother)

John Malcolm Crim (1886–1971) was an American businessman, oilman, politician, and a leader within the Mount Tabor Indian Community, who served as the first mayor of Kilgore, Texas following its 1931 incorporation. As a member of the Crim family, he played a pivotal role in the discovery of the East Texas Oil Field and the subsequent transformation of the city during the oil boom era.

== Early life and family prominence ==
The Crim family was among Kilgore's earliest settlers, having relocated from Danville, Texas. They established significant commercial and residential presence in the community, owning multiple downtown properties including the Crim National Bank, Crim Mercantile Store, Crim Office Building, and the Crim Theater. The family maintained two historic residences: the Dean Keener Crim Home (c. 1876) at 101 E. North Street (Kilgore's oldest surviving structure), and the Lou Della Crim House (1920) at 201 N. Longview Street. Their influence was further recognized through local landmarks including Crimwood neighborhood, Crim Street, and Crim Avenue.

He was also a nephew of John Martin Thompson, a figure whose wife was connected to prominent Cherokee families and was instrumental in the founding of the Mount Tabor Indian Community. Crim himself led the community's Cherokees during the Depression era.

== Oil discovery ==
Following C.M. "Dad" Joiner's October 1930 oil strike at Daisy Bradford #3 near Henderson, Malcolm Crim directed drilling operations on his mother Lou Della Crim's property at Laird Hill. On December 28, 1930, the Bateman-Crim Wildcat Well No. 1 (also known as Lou Della Crim No. 1) blew in just outside the front porch of the Lou Della Crim House, producing 20,000 barrels daily and confirming the oilfield's extension into Kilgore. This discovery triggered an unprecedented population explosion from approximately 700 to over 10,000 within days.

The sudden influx of workers created severe civic strain, with makeshift settlements like Happy Hollow (now Kilgore City Park) emerging as centers of lawlessness. Described as "both sides of town being the wrong side of the tracks," Kilgore experienced rampant crime, vice, and makeshift housing including piano-crate dwellings. Texas Rangers were frequently summoned for peacekeeping, notably Ranger Bob Goss (later Kilgore Police Chief), who earned the nickname "The Shadow" for his law enforcement tactics.

== Mayoral leadership ==
Facing uncontrollable conditions, Kilgore incorporated as a city in 1931. Crim was overwhelmingly elected first mayor by a 102-0 vote, later stating he accepted the position to prevent the city from being "overrun with the wrong kind of people." He personally housed Texas Ranger Captain M.T. "Lone Wolf" Gonzaullas in his mother's home to oversee law enforcement operations. His administration navigated Kilgore's transformation into what newspapers called "the capital of the world's largest oil field," characterized by dense oil derricks surrounding downtown buildings.

He was 82 when he passed in Tyler, Texas, on June 5, 1971.

== Legacy ==
The Crim family homes remain preserved by the Kilgore Historical Preservation Foundation, with the Lou Della Crim House restoration project ongoing as of 2025. The Lou Della Crim No. 1 well operated until 1961, symbolizing Kilgore's oil boom origins. Crim's leadership during the chaotic transition from agricultural community to oil boomtown cemented his family's legacy in Kilgore's development.

== See also ==
- History of Kilgore
- Columbus Marion Joiner
- Boomtown
