= Sweethearts of the Gridiron =

2015 American documentary film

- Theatrical release poster
- Directed by: Chip Hale
- Produced by: Chip Hale; Steven Hornstein; Mikaela Addison; Iggy Rodriguez
- Starring: Kilgore College Rangerettes; Dana Blair; Shelley Wayne; Gussie Nell Davis (archive footage)
- Cinematography: Chip Hale
- Edited by: Iggy Rodriguez; Mikaela Addison
- Music by: Joe Kraemer; Lane Harder
- Distributed by: Well Go USA Entertainment
- Release dates: October 17, 2015 (Kilgore, Texas); September 6, 2016 (U.S. DVD)
- Running time: 87 minutes
- Country: United States
- Language: English

Sweethearts of the Gridiron is a 2015 American documentary film directed by Chip Hale. The film chronicles the history and enduring legacy of the Kilgore College Rangerettes, the world's first precision dance-drill team. The title is taken from the Rangerettes' well-known nickname, "America's Sweethearts of the Gridiron."

The documentary examines the group's founding in 1939–1940 by Gussie Nell Davis and follows the modern-day organization as it prepares for its 75th anniversary. It places a strong focus on the rigorous, week-long audition process that prospective members must endure to earn a place on the team, highlighting the physical and emotional demands required to become a Rangerette. The film utilizes modern interviews, behind-the-scenes footage, and extensive archival photos and film to tell its story.

Sweethearts of the Gridiron premiered in Kilgore, Texas, on October 17, 2015, and was released on DVD in the United States on September 6, 2016, by Well Go USA Entertainment.

== Synopsis ==
The film is structured into three main acts. It begins by exploring the history of Kilgore, Texas, explaining how the Texas Oil Boom and the massive East Texas Oil Field provided the unique economic and cultural environment that led to the creation of the Rangerettes. Kilgore College president Dr. B.E. Masters hired Gussie Nell Davis in 1939 with the goals of increasing female enrollment and creating a "wholesome" social organization for women.

The documentary details the Rangerettes' first performance on September 12, 1940, and their rapid rise to national fame, showcasing their iconic red, white, and blue uniforms and precision kick-line. It uses archival footage to show performances at presidential inaugurations, bowl games, and parades throughout their history.

A significant portion of the film is dedicated to the contemporary Rangerettes. Director Chip Hale and his crew followed the organization for a year, capturing the intense annual audition process. The documentary follows a group of "Hopefuls" as they compete for a limited number of spots on the team. It showcases the leadership of then-directors Dana Blair and Shelley Wayne, both former Rangerettes themselves, as they instruct, evaluate, and ultimately select the new members of the team. The film highlights the discipline, athleticism, and tradition that have been passed down through generations of the organization.

== Participants ==
- Dana Blair - Co-Director, Kilgore College Rangerettes
- Shelley Wayne - Co-Director & Choreographer, Kilgore College Rangerettes
- Gussie Nell Davis (archive footage) - Founder
- The 75th Line of the Kilgore College Rangerettes
- The 2014 Rangerette Hopefuls

== Production ==
The film's production began several years before its release, initiated by director Chip Hale. A Kickstarter campaign was launched in 2012 to help fund the project, which was described as a documentary about "the first women's dancing drill team, the Rangerettes, who in 1940 brought showbiz to the gridiron." Hale, a filmmaker with family ties to the East Texas area, spent a full year embedded with the Rangerettes to capture the entire cycle of their season, from the departure of the sophomores to the selection and training of the freshmen "Hopefuls." The film's official trailer was released in April 2014.

== Release ==
Sweethearts of the Gridiron held its world premiere at the Dodson Auditorium on the Kilgore College campus in Kilgore, Texas, on October 17, 2015.

Following its premiere, the film was named an official selection at the 2015 Dallas International Film Festival, with local news station WFAA reporting on its inclusion and screening at the Angelika Film Center in Dallas.

== Reception ==
Critical reception for the documentary was mixed, with reviewers acknowledging the film's appeal to its target audience but offering different opinions on its broader success.

Brandi D. Addison of the North Texas Daily praised the film's focus on its subjects, stating, "What makes the film... is the rich development of each character, allowing the audience to become invested in the lives of the young women." KERA's Art&Seek public radio program also highlighted the film's success in capturing the unique pressure and legacy of the organization from an insider's perspective.

The documentary was presented as a tribute to the 75-year history of the Rangerettes. In a feature for the Longview News-Journal, director Chip Hale stated his goal was to showcase the "hard work and dedication" required of the dancers, explaining that he wanted to capture the full story "from the girls trying out all the way to the end of the year." Similarly, an article in Texas Co-op Power described the film as a chronicle of the team's legacy and its demanding, modern-day audition process, framing it as an homage to the world's first precision dance team.
