= Kilgore Drillers =

The Kilgore Drillers were a minor league baseball team that was member in the Lone Star League from 1947 to 1948 and the East Texas League from 1949 to 1950. Based in Kilgore, Texas playing their home games at Driller Park giving the Ballpark its name, it was the city's last professional baseball team. Joe Kracher managed and played for the team in 1947, 1948 and 1949, leading the club to consecutive league championships in '47 and '48 (the team lost the league finals in '49). Fred Baczewski also played for the team in 1948 and the 1949 club featured Merv Connors and Jerry Fahr. The 1950 club, managed by Al Kubski, lost in the first round of the league playoffs. Connors played for the team that year, as well.

The Kilgore Drillers folded after the 1950 season. They had played consistently winning baseball claiming two consecutive championships in the Lone Star League, were the runners-up in 1949, and had a respectable finish in 1950 before being disbanded. It was 58 years before Driller Park saw another team take residence.

== Seasons ==
1947 season
They finished the regular season at the top of the standings with a 78–60 record. In the playoffs, they swept the Tyler Trojans while the Marshall Comets beat the Longview Texans, 4–1. In the championship series, the Drillers defeated the Comets 4 games to 2 to become the 1947 Lone Star League champions.

1948 season
They finished the regular season at the top of the standings once again, with a 94–44 record. In the playoffs, they defeated the Henderson Oilers 4 games to 3 while the Longview Texans defeated the Tyler Trojans 4 games to 3 also. In the championship series, the Drillers beat the Texans to become Lone Star League champions again.

1949 season
In their first season in the East Texas League, the Drillers finished in 4th place with a record of 75–65. In the playoffs, they defeated the Longview Texans 4 games to 3; the Gladewater Bears defeated the Paris Panthers 4 games to 3 also. In the championship series, Kilgore finished as the runner-up to Gladewater being beaten in four games.

1950 season
The Drillers finished 3rd in 1950. In the playoffs, Kilgore was beaten by the Marshall Browns 4 games to one in the first round.

Driller Park is now the Ballpark for Kilgore High School.

== Driller Park plaque ==
On April 24, 1947, the Drillers played their first game in front of a full house. A Texas Historical Commission plaque outside Driller Park states:

On April 24, 1947, more than 3,100 fans celebrated the postwar return of baseball as the Kilgore Drillers played the Henderson Oilers on Driller Park's opening day. Erected by the Kilgore Baseball Club for $100,000 on land deeded to the city of Kilgore by S. S. Laird, the park straddles the line between Gregg and Rusk Counties. An excellent example of small stadium engineering, the ballpark was constructed of oil field pipe, tank steel, and concrete with an infield underground drainage system. Though the Drillers disbanded in 1950, Driller Park continues to be a haven for baseball in the city of Kilgore.
