= Danville, Texas =

Neighborhood in Kilgore, Texas, United States

- Neighborhood
- Location within Texas Location within the United States
- Coordinates: 32°24′04″N 94°49′37″W
- Country: United States
- State: Texas
- County: Gregg
- Elevation: 371 ft (113 m)
- Time zone: UTC-6 (Central (CST))
  - Summer (DST): UTC-5 (CDT)
- Area codes: 430 & 903
- Airport: East Texas Regional Airport

Danville, historically known as New Danville and Rabbit Creek, is a neighborhood of the city of Kilgore, Texas, United States. Originally known as New Danville, the then-unincorporated community served as a significant settlement before being eclipsed by neighboring Kilgore. Portions of Danville were formally annexed by Kilgore in 1981 and 1996, integrating these areas as neighborhoods within Kilgore city limits. Danville Farms, a Christmas tree farm operating since 1982, is situated on unincorporated land directly adjacent to Kilgore.

== History ==
=== Founding and peak (1840s–1860s) ===
Danville was established c. 1847 by settlers from Danville, Kentucky, including S. Slade Barnett, who named it for their former hometown. (Note: Some sources cite 1848 as the founding year.) Originally called Rabbit Creek, it received a post office under that name in 1850. The post office was renamed New Danville in 1852 and operated until 1873. Key institutions emerged quickly:

- Gum Spring Presbyterian Church: Organized October 7, 1850, by Rev. J. M. Becton. Its inaugural congregation included Meshack Barber, S. S. Barnett, and C. W. Scott. A log church built in 1849 served as its first sanctuary.
- New Danville Masonic Lodge: Chartered in 1852, becoming a community anchor.
- The New Danville Masonic Female Academy, founded in 1854 in Danville In 1873, the academy moved to Kilgore proper and became property of the Kilgore Methodist Church, changing its name to the Alexander Institute in honor of its president Isaac Alexander, an early Texas educator. The Institute later becoming the Lon Morris College, which was the oldest existing two-year college in Texas until its closure in 2012.

At its peak during the Civil War era, New Danville had 3–4 stores, multiple saloons, a blacksmith shop, and a mule-powered cotton gin. Its population was estimated at ~1,000 residents.

=== Decline and legacy (1870s–1940s) ===
The community declined abruptly in the 1870s when the International-Great Northern Railroad bypassed it, opting instead to establish Kilgore 3 miles (4.8 km) southeast in 1872. Most residents and businesses relocated to Kilgore, including the Gum Spring Presbyterian Church, which moved in 1874 and became Kilgore's First Presbyterian Church. Earlier, on December 31, 1857, the original log church had burned down; a replacement structure built in 1858 later housed a Masonic academy.

By the 1940s, Danville retained only a church, cemetery, and two stores. These stores later closed, reducing the community to scattered homes by the 1990s. Among families relocating to Kilgore were the Crims, who became influential in Kilgore's development during the East Texas oil boom (1930s). (Note: While the Crims are not explicitly named in the sources, their migration aligns with the documented exodus from Danville to Kilgore.)

=== Connection to Kilgore and the Crim family ===
Danville's history intersects significantly with Kilgore, founded in 1872. The railroad bypassed "New Danville" (a satellite community of the original settlement) to plat Kilgore on land sold by Constantine Buckley Kilgore. Among those relocating to Kilgore were members of the Crim family, who became influential in Kilgore's development. Malcolm Crim served as Kilgore's first mayor after its 1931 incorporation during the East Texas oil boom, and the family owned key downtown properties including the Crim Office Building, Crim Theater, and a bank.

== Geography ==
Danville is located on Danville Road, south of FM 349 and east of US 259, approximately 3 miles (4.8 km) northeast of Kilgore and 8 miles (13 km) southwest of Longview (Gregg County seat). Terrain consists of rolling hills within the East Texas timberlands, drained by tributaries of the Sabine River.

- Annexation by Kilgore: Sections of Danville's former territory were annexed by Kilgore during its 20th-century expansion, integrating them into Kilgore's municipal infrastructure.
- Christmas Tree Farm: A Christmas tree farm operates on unincorporated land near the original Danville borders, reflecting the area's agricultural legacy.

== Demographics ==
Note: Portions of Danville are no longer separately enumerated after the Kilgore's annexation. Being enumerated into Kilgore's demographics instead

== Notable sites ==
- Old Danville Family Cemetery: Private cemetery on Shepard Hill Road with graves of early settlers; features a historical marker summarizing the town's history.
- Gum Spring Presbyterian Church Site: Marked by a 1970 Texas Historical Commission marker near the original location.
- Christmas Tree Farm: Active seasonal attraction on the periphery of the former townsite.

== See also ==
- Kilgore, Texas
