= Roy H. Laird =

American businessman and politician (1889–1950)

2nd Mayor of Kilgore
- In office 1933–1950
- Preceded by: Malcolm Crim
- Succeeded by: Eugene C. Elder

Personal details
- Born: Roy Harlan Laird; April 6, 1889 Texas, U.S.
- Died: December 19, 1950 Kilgore, Gregg County, Texas, U.S.
- Spouse(s): Mary Ann Hubbard Laird (d. 1919); Annie Nolen Laird (m. 1933)

Roy Harlan Laird (April 6, 1889 – December 19, 1950) was an American businessman and politician who served as Mayor of Kilgore, Texas for an extensive period during the city's oil boom and post-boom development. He is highly regarded for his pivotal role in establishing key civic institutions, including the Kilgore Public Library and the Roy H. Laird Memorial Hospital, which later evolved into the modern Kilgore College Health Science Center.

== Early life and family ==
Roy H. Laird was born on April 6, 1889, in Texas. In his early career, he reportedly worked as a rural mail carrier.

Laird was married twice. His first wife was Mary Ann Hubbard Laird, who died in 1919. He later married Annie Nolen in 1933. He died in Kilgore, Texas, on December 19, 1950, at the age of 61.

== Mayoral leadership ==
Roy H. Laird's mayoral service began in 1933, succeeding Malcolm Crim as Mayor of Kilgore. He was a candidate for Mayor in the Kilgore City Election held on April 4, 1933. By December 1933, he was confirmed as Mayor, signing official city ordinances.

Laird served continuously as Mayor of Kilgore from 1933 until 1950, holding the mayoral office through multiple two-year terms. His leadership is evidenced by his signatures on various city ordinances and appearances in City Commission minutes across these years: He served as mayor until his death in 1950, when he was succeeded by Eugene C. Elder.

During his extensive tenure, his administration oversaw critical civic projects such as elections for bond issues for street paving and the extension of the sewage disposal plant in late 1933. He also participated in civic events, such as tossing the first ball at the opening of Driller Park.

== Contributions to Kilgore and Legacy ==
Laird's influence extended significantly beyond his mayoral duties, impacting Kilgore's educational and healthcare infrastructure, and cementing his legacy in the city's development.

=== Kilgore Public Library ===
Under Mayor Laird's leadership, the City of Kilgore took over sponsorship of the Kilgore Public Library around 1937. He, along with City Commissioners J. E. Bagwell and E. C. Middlebrook, led the initiative to construct a permanent library building. This structure, completed in October 1939 at a cost of $45,454, was partly funded by a Public Works Administration (PWA) grant of $20,454. The French Provincial-designed building remains the Kilgore Public Library building today.

=== Roy H. Laird Memorial Hospital and Health Science Center ===
A cornerstone of Laird's enduring legacy is the Roy H. Laird Memorial Hospital. The hospital, named in his honor, served the Kilgore community for decades.

After his death, the Roy H. Laird Memorial Hospital Trust was formed in 1957, and the Roy H. Laird Memorial Hospital Foundation Inc. was established in 1994. Both organizations are dedicated to promoting, fostering, and supporting healthcare services for the indigent and general public in Kilgore and the surrounding areas.

In 2024, a new, state-of-the-art facility, the Roy H. Laird Health Science Center & Torrence Health Science Education Center, officially opened on the grounds of the former Laird Memorial Hospital. This nearly 75,000-square-foot facility is a collaborative effort between CHRISTUS Good Shepherd, Kilgore College, the City of Kilgore, and the Roy H. Laird Memorial Hospital Foundation. It houses Kilgore College's health science programs (nursing, physical therapy assistant, radiologic technology) and provides new clinical spaces, continuing Laird's commitment to both healthcare and education. Kilgore Mayor Ronnie Spradlin highlighted the project as a major achievement, continuing the lasting legacy of Roy H. Laird Memorial Hospital.

== See also ==
- History of Kilgore
- Kilgore College
- East Texas Oil Field
