= Kentucky Fried Chicken murders =

1983 mass murder in Kilgore, Texas

- Location: Kilgore, Texas, U.S.
- Date: September 23, 1983; 43 years ago
- Attack type: Armed robbery, mass murder
- Deaths: 5
- Victims: Opie Hughes; Joey Johnson; Monty Landers; David Maxwell; Mary Tyler
- Perpetrators: Darnell Hartsfield; Romeo Pinkerton; Devan Riggs

The Kentucky Fried Chicken murders were an armed robbery and mass murder that took place at a Kentucky Fried Chicken restaurant in Kilgore, Texas, United States, on the evening of September 23, 1983, resulting in the deaths of five people. The case remained unsolved for 22 years until arrests were made in November 2005, leading to life sentences for cousins Romeo Pinkerton and Darnell Hartsfield in 2007 and 2008, respectively; Hartsfield died in prison in 2022. After the Texas Rangers reopened the case in 2023, DNA evidence linked a third perpetrator, Devan Riggs, who had died in 2010, to the crime in 2025.

== Robbery and murders ==
On the evening of September 23, 1983, just before the restaurant closed, armed robbers held up the Kentucky Fried Chicken restaurant in Kilgore, Texas, United States. The five people in the restaurant at the time (three of whom were restaurant employees and two of whom were friends of one of them and waiting for someone there) were abducted, taken to a nearby field on County Road 232, and each executed with a shot to the back of the head along with shots to the torso. One of the victims, Opie Hughes, was found a short distance from the others and had been raped.

The victims' bodies were discovered by a local resident and were identified as: David Maxwell (20), Joey Johnson (20), Monty Landers (19), Mary Tyler (37), and Opie Hughes (39).

== Investigation ==
For 22 years, the case remained unsolved, although several people were arrested. The discovery of a torn fingernail on one of the bodies led to the arrest and charging of James Earl Mankins Jr., a man with prior drug convictions who was also the son of state representative Jimmy Mankins. However, DNA analysis concluded that the fingernail was not his, and he was released after the beginning of pre-trial proceedings.

In November 2005, two men (already in prison for other crimes) were arrested and charged: cousins Darnell Hartsfield (44) and Romeo Pinkerton (47). At the time of arrest, Hartsfield, a Tyler resident, was serving a life sentence for aggravated perjury in connection with the case. They were both charged with capital murder and could have received the death penalty if convicted. Investigators also stated that, according to DNA evidence, a third, then-unidentified perpetrator took part in the murders and had committed the rape of Hughes.

In 2023, the Texas Rangers reopened the case. In May 2025, DNA evidence found on the clothing of one of the victims identified three brothers in East Texas. In November, a man named Devan Riggs, who died in 2010, was positively identified as the origin of the DNA evidence.

== Convictions ==
Jury selection in Pinkerton's trial began on August 6, 2007, in New Boston and was completed on September 27, 2007. Pinkerton's death penalty trial was scheduled to start at 9 a.m. on October 15, 2007, at the Bowie County Courthouse in New Boston. An April 2007 article from the Houston Chronicle details Pinkerton's denial of the crime. Despite this, on October 29, 2007, Romeo Pinkerton pleaded guilty to five lesser counts of murder and was sentenced to five concurrent life sentences as a part of a plea deal. He is currently serving his sentence at the James V. Allred Unit in Wichita Falls.

In 2008, Hartsfield was convicted at trial in Bryan (Brazos County), Texas (on a change of venue from East Texas due to pre-trial publicity), and sentenced to five consecutive life sentences. On February 4, 2010, the Texas Sixth Court of Appeals upheld Hartsfield's conviction.

=== Death of Darnell Hartsfield ===
On May 4, 2022, one of the two suspects, Darnell Hartsfield, died after suffering a massive hemorrhagic stroke in his jail cell at the French M. Robertson Unit in Abilene at age 61. At the time, Hartsfield's next parole hearing had been scheduled for January 2023.

== In media ==
- The murders were featured in the "Friday Night Ghosts" episode of Cold Case Files, which aired in February 2022.
