= Mankins =

Mankins may refer to

- Mankins, Texas, an unincorporated community in the United States
- Jim Mankins (born 1944), American football player
- Jimmy Mankins (1926–2013), American businessman and politician
- Logan Mankins (born 1982), American football guard
- John C. Mankins
