= Driller Park =

Baseball park in Kilgore, Texas, US

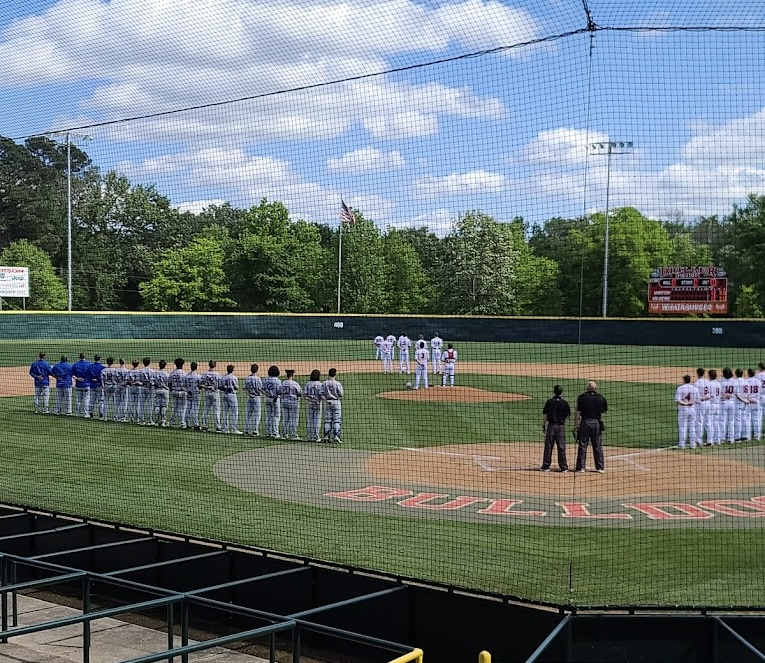
- Driller Park

- Location in Texas Location in the United States
- Address: 2100 South Commerce Street; United States
- Location: Kilgore, Texas, U.S.
- Coordinates: 32°22′15.0″N 94°52′44.9″W
- Owner: City of Kilgore
- Operator: City of Kilgore Parks Department / Kilgore High School Bulldogs
- Capacity: 3,000 (day); 3,000 (night)
- Surface: Kentucky Blue Grass
- Record attendance: 3,100+ (April 24, 1947)

Construction
- Groundbreaking: 1946
- Opened: April 24, 1947
- Renovated: 2008, 2021-2022
- Cost: US$100,000 ($3.34 million in 2025 dollars)
- General contractor: Kilgore Baseball Club

Tenants
- Kilgore Drillers (Lone Star League/East Texas League) (1947–1950, 1953); East Texas Pump Jacks (Texas Collegiate League) (2008–present); Kilgore High School Bulldogs (19**–present)

Website
- visitkilgore.com/driller-park/
- Driller Park

Driller Park was originally a minor league baseball stadium in Kilgore, Texas, US, constructed in 1947 for the Kilgore Drillers and refurbished in 2008 for the East Texas Pump Jacks of the Texas Collegiate League. The park has also been used for East Texas college and high school baseball matches. The park has a capacity of 3,000.

== Driller Park plaque ==
On April 24, 1947, the Drillers played their first game in front of a full house. A Texas Historical Commission plaque outside Driller Park states:

On April 24, 1947, more than 3,100 fans celebrated the postwar return of baseball as the Kilgore Drillers played the Henderson Oilers on Driller Park's opening day. Erected by the Kilgore Baseball Club for $100,000 on land deeded to the city of Kilgore by S. S. Laird, the park straddles the line between Gregg and Rusk Counties. An excellent example of small stadium engineering, the ballpark was constructed of oil field pipe, tank steel, and concrete with an infield underground drainage system. Though the Drillers disbanded in 1950, Driller Park continues to be a haven for baseball in the city of Kilgore.

== Kilgore Drillers ==
The Kilgore Drillers existed briefly for four seasons, playing the first two seasons in the Lone Star League and the last two in the East Texas League. The Drillers were successful in their years in the Lone Star League and the East Texas League.

The Kilgore Drillers folded after the 1950 season. They had played consistently winning baseball claiming two consecutive championships in the Lone Star League, were the runners-up in 1949, and had a respectable finish in 1950 before being disbanded. It was 58 years before Driller Park saw another team take residence.

1947 season
They finished the regular season at the top of the standings with a 78–60 record. In the playoffs, they swept the Tyler Trojans while the Marshall Comets beat the Longview Texans, 4–1. In the championship series, the Drillers defeated the Comets 4 games to 2 to become the 1947 Lone Star League champions.

1948 season
They finished the regular season at the top of the standings once again, with a 94–44 record. In the playoffs, they defeated the Henderson Oilers 4 games to 3 while the Longview Texans defeated the Tyler Trojans 4 games to 3 also. In the championship series, the Drillers beat the Texans to become Lone Star League champions again.

1949 season
In their first season in the East Texas League, the Drillers finished in 4th place with a record of 75–65. In the playoffs, they defeated the Longview Texans 4 games to 3; the Gladewater Bears defeated the Paris Panthers 4 games to 3 also. In the championship series, Kilgore finished as the runner-up to Gladewater being beaten in four games.

1950 season
Final season before dissolution: The Drillers finished 3rd in 1950. In the playoffs, Kilgore was beaten by the Marshall Browns 4 games to one in the first round.

- Team disbanded due to declining attendance and oil industry contraction

== The return of summer collegiate baseball ==
In January 2008, it was announced that the Texas Collegiate League would add a team in Kilgore for the upcoming season. Fans were invited to make suggestions to the front office of the new club in the "Name Your Team" contest. In early April 2008, general manager Mike Lieberman announced the new team would be called the East Texas Pump Jacks, complete with dual logos representing East Texas' history in the oil industry. One logo is a donkey representing the pumping unit or horsehead pump, the over ground for a reciprocating piston installed in a borehole. It is used to mechanically lift liquid out of the well if there is not enough bottom hole pressure for the liquid to flow all the way to the surface. The other logo is a dinosaur, representing the fossil fuels used in oil drilling.

In their first season at Driller Park, the Pump Jacks finished third with a 22–26 record before being beaten by the Coppell Copperheads in the first round.
