= Eugene C. Elder =

American educator and politician (1905–1998)

3rd Mayor of Kilgore
- In office 1951–1957
- Preceded by: Roy H. Laird
- Succeeded by: L. N. Crim

City Manager

City Councilman

Justice of the Peace

Superintendent of Schools

Principal of Kilgore High School

Personal details
- Born: Eugene Campbell Elder; August 26, 1905 Kilgore, Gregg, Texas, United States
- Died: August 4, 1998 (aged 92) Kilgore, Gregg, Texas, United States
- Spouse: Mary Louise Kennedy/Elder
- Children: Nora Gene Elder Eubanks
- Parents: John Samuel Elder (father); Camie Carter Wilkins/Elder (mother)

Eugene Campbell "Gene" Elder (August 26, 1905 – August 4, 1998) was an American educator and politician who served in numerous public offices in Kilgore, Texas, most notably as the city's third Mayor from 1951 to 1957. A member of one of Kilgore's original land-holding families that prospered during the oil boom, Elder was a widely respected community leader known for his willingness to serve in various civic roles.

== Early Life and Education Career ==
Eugene Campbell Elder was born on August 26, 1905, in Kilgore, Texas, to John Samuel Elder and Camie Carter Wilkins/Elder. The Elder family were among the original landowners in the Kilgore area and saw their fortunes rise with the discovery of oil.

Before entering politics, Elder had a distinguished career in education. He served as the Principal of Kilgore High School and later became the Superintendent of Schools for the Kilgore Independent School District, a position he held until 1935.

== Public Service and Political Career ==
Elder's career in public service was extensive and varied, demonstrating a deep commitment to the civic life of Kilgore. A 1970 dissertation on community leadership described him as having been "a little bit of everything," a sentiment echoed by residents who noted he was influential because "he was willing to do just about anything that needed to be done to help Kilgore." His known roles in city government include, Justice of the Peace, President of the Chamber of Commerce (1940), City Councilman, and City Manager.

=== Mayor of Kilgore ===
In 1951, Eugene C. Elder succeeded Roy H. Laird as the elected Mayor of Kilgore, following Laird's death in office. He served as mayor for six years, until 1957. During his tenure, he was highly regarded by the community. According to interviews conducted for the dissertation, residents respected and liked him, and it was believed that he "could be elected mayor if he would run again." While no specific projects were attributed to his mayorship in the interviews, his leadership was exemplified by the numerous public offices he held.

== Family and Legacy ==
Eugene Elder married Mary Louise Barnes, and together they had a daughter, Nora Gene Elder. His family's influence was significant, with their name being associated with the original settlement and subsequent oil-related prosperity of Kilgore. The basis of his influence was cited as a combination of broad public support and the family's oil wealth.

The W. W. Elder School built in 1933 for white students (named after William Wesley Elder who was Eugene's uncle). In 1961, Elder was repurposed as an elementary school for Black students and operated as a segregated school until integration occurred in 1968. As of 2021 it has been transtioned into a Winery, Vineyard, Theater, and Museum.

He died on August 4, 1998, in Kilgore, Texas, at the age of 93.

== See also ==
- History of Kilgore
