= Kilgore High School =

Location
- 711 North Longview Street; Kilgore, Texas 75662; United States; 32.39341°N 94.8732°W

Information
- School type: Public high school
- Motto: "Kilgore Proud", "Bulldog Strong"
- School district: Kilgore Independent School District
- Superintendent: Andy Baker
- Principal: Marcus Camp
- Staff: 84.69 (FTE)
- Grades: 9–12
- Enrollment: 1,168 (2023-2024)
- Student to teacher ratio: 13.79
- Colors: Red & White
- Athletics conference: UIL
- Mascot: Bulldogs
- Newspaper: Mirror
- Yearbook: Reflector
- Football Sports District: 4A D1-8
- All Other Sports District: 4A-16
- Website: Kilgore High School

Kilgore High School is a public high school in Kilgore, Texas, United States. It is classified as a 4A school by the University Interscholastic League (UIL), and is part of the Kilgore Independent School District. In 2022, the school was given an Accountability Rating of 'B' by the Texas Education Agency.

== Extracurricular activities ==
The Kilgore Bulldogs compete in the following sports:

- Baseball (Boys)
- Basketball (Boys & Girls)
- Cross Country (Boys & Girls)
- Football (Boys)
- Golf (Boys & Girls)
- Soccer (Boys & Girls)
- Softball (Girls)
- Tennis (Boys & Girls)
- Track & Field (Boys & Girls)
- Volleyball (Girls)

=== Athletic titles ===
- Football
  - 2004 - 4A Division 2 State Champion
  - 2013 - 3A Division 1 State Runner-Up
  - 2024 - 4A Division 1 State Runner-Up
  - 2025 - 4A Division 1 State Runner-Up
- Baseball
  - 2018 4A Regional Finalist
  - 2019 4A State Semi-Finalist
- Boys Track
  - 1974 - 3A State Champion
- Boys Soccer
  - 2024 - 4A Region 2 Champion and State Semi-Finalist.
  - 2018 - 4A-16 Conference Champion. Lost in third round of playoffs.
  - 2017 - 4A State Champion
  - 2016 - 4A Region 2 Champion and State Semi-Finalist. Lost to eventual 4A state champion Palestine in a 3-2 shootout.
  - 2015 - 4A Region 2 Champion and State Semi-Finalist. Lost to eventual 4A state champion San Elizario, 5-1.
  - 2014 - 4A-32 Conference Champion. Lost in third round of playoffs.
  - 2013 - 4A Region 2 Runner-Up (State Quarterfinalist)
  - 2012 - 4A Region 2 Runner-Up (State Quarterfinalist)
  - 2011 - 4A State Finalist. Lost to Boerne Champion 2-1 in state championship match.
- Cheer
  - 2021 - 4A Best of Fight Song & 4th Place
  - 2022 - 4A Division 1 4th Place
  - 2023 - 4A Division 1 Top 20 Finalist
  - 2024 - 4A Division 1 Best of Fight Song & Top 20 Finalist
  - 2026 - 4A Division 1 Top 20 Finalist

=== Student life ===
The Mirror is a newspaper edited and published by students.

== Football ==
The football and soccer teams play their home games at R.E. Saint John Memorial Stadium, sharing the facility with the Kilgore College football team.

On December 18, 2004, the Kilgore High School "Ragin' Red" Bulldog football team completed a perfect season (16–0) after winning the Class 4A Division II state championship game, 33–27, in a double-overtime thriller against the Dallas Lincoln Tigers at Baylor University's Floyd Casey Stadium in Waco. Nick Sanders blocked a potential go-ahead field goal attempt by Lincoln and returned it for the winning touchdown.

Football Records Table
Season	Conf	Dist	Overall Record	District Record	Playoff Record	Coach	Notes	Ref
1931	B		5-3			H.P. Gaston		
1932	B	16	5-3			Johnny Wright (9-7-1)		
1933	B	16	4-4-1			Johnny Wright (9-7-1)		
1934	1A	10	2-4-2			Bob Waters (13-24-4)		
1935	1A	10	0-8			Bob Waters (13-24-4)		
1936	1A	9	4-4-1			Bob Waters (13-24-4)		
1937	1A	9	4-3-1			Bob Waters (13-24-4)		
1938	1A	9	3-5			Bob Waters (13-24-4)		
1939	1A	9	8-2			I.B. Hale (14-3-2)		
1940	2A	11	6-1-2			I.B. Hale (14-3-2)		
1941	2A	11	7-2-1			R.E. St. John		
1942	2A	11	6-3			Floyd Wagstaff (17-10-1)		
1943	2A	11	5-3-1			Floyd Wagstaff (17-10-1)		
1944	2A	11	6-4			Floyd Wagstaff (17-10-1)		
1945	2A	11	1-8-1			Wilson McKewen (7-11-2)		
1946	2A	11	6-3-1			Wilson McKewen (7-11-2)		
1947	2A	11	6-2-2			Harold Neal (10-8-2)		
1948	2A	8	4-6			Harold Neal (10-8-2)		
1949	2A	8	1-8-2			M.A. Hopson (7-20-4)		
1950	2A	9	3-5-2			M.A. Hopson (7-20-4)		
1951	2A	9	3-7			M.A. Hopson (7-20-4)		
1952	3A	4	5-5			Ty Bain (68-34-3)		
1953	3A	4	8-1-2		0-1	Ty Bain (68-34-3)		
1954	3A	4	4-6			Ty Bain (68-34-3)		
1955	3A	4	7-3			Ty Bain (68-34-3)		
1956	3A	7	10-2		0-1	Ty Bain (68-34-3)		
1957	3A	7	8-3			Ty Bain (68-34-3)		
1958	3A	7	6-3-1			Ty Bain (68-34-3)		
1959	3A	7	8-3			Ty Bain (68-34-3)		
1960	3A	7	7-3			Ty Bain (68-34-3)		
1961	3A	7	5-5			Ty Bain (68-34-3)		
1962	3A	7	3-6-1			Prince Scott (12-16-2)		
1963	3A	7	5-5			Prince Scott (12-16-2)		
1964	3A	7	4-5-1			Prince Scott (12-16-2)		
1965	3A	7	7-3			Jim Hess (11-9)		
1966	3A	7	4-6			Jim Hess (11-9)		
1967	3A	7	3-7			Raymond Haas (9-20)		
1968	3A	7	2-8			Raymond Haas (9-20)		
1969	3A	7	4-5			Raymond Haas (9-20)		
1970	3A	8	4-6			John Blocker (27-13)		
1971	3A	8	7-3			John Blocker (27-13)		
1972	3A	9	8-2			John Blocker (27-13)		
1973	3A	9	8-2			John Blocker (27-13)		
1974	3A	9	2-8			Buddy Humphrey (3-16-1)		
1975	3A	9	1-8-1			Buddy Humphrey (3-16-1)		
1976	3A	8	8-1-1			Kyle Gantt (15-4-1)		
1977	3A	8	7-3			Kyle Gantt (15-4-1)		
1978	3A	8	6-4			Lawrence Kalmus (24-17)		
1979	3A	8	7-3			Lawrence Kalmus (24-17)		
1980	4A	8	7-4			Lawrence Kalmus (24-17)		
1981	4A	8	4-6			Lawrence Kalmus (24-17)		
1982	4A	8	6-4			James Cameron (47-20-1)		
1983	4A	8	4-6			James Cameron (47-20-1)		
1984	4A	8	8-2			James Cameron (47-20-1)		
1985	4A	8	8-3			James Cameron (47-20-1)		
1986	4A	8	9-3-1		0-1	James Cameron (47-20-1)		
1987	4A	8	12-2		2-1	James Cameron (47-20-1)	State Quarterfinalist	
1988	4A	16	9-2-1		2-1	James Cameron (47-20-1)		
1989	4A	16	5-5			Jack Rushing (6-13)		
1990	4A	16	1-8			Jack Rushing (6-13)		
1991	4A	16	6-5		1-1	Billy Rhodes (22-17-3)		
1992	4A	15	7-3-1		0-1	Billy Rhodes (22-17-3)		
1993	4A	15	4-4-2			Billy Rhodes (22-17-3)		
1994	4A	17	5-5			Billy Rhodes (22-17-3)		
1995	4A	17	7-5		1-1	Mike Vallery (138-42-1)		
1996	4A II	16	10-2-1		2-1	Mike Vallery (138-42-1)		
1997	4A II	16	9-3		1-1	Mike Vallery (138-42-1)		
1998	4A II	17	9-3		1-1	Mike Vallery (138-42-1)		
1999	4A II	17	9-2		0-1	Mike Vallery (138-42-1)		
2000	4A II	16	6-5		0-1	Mike Vallery (138-42-1)		
2001	4A II	16	7-4		0-1	Mike Vallery (138-42-1)		
2002	4A II	13	8-3		0-1	Mike Vallery (138-42-1)		
2003	4A II	13	12-2		3-1	Mike Vallery (138-42-1)	State Quarterfinalist	
2004	4A II	17	16-0	7-0	6-0	Mike Vallery (138-42-1)	State Champion	
2005	4A II	17	11-2	6-1	2-1	Mike Vallery (138-42-1)		
2006	4A II	12	6-4	4-3		Mike Vallery (138-42-1)		
2007	4A II	12	9-3	6-1	1-1	Mike Vallery (138-42-1)		
2008	4A II	14	9-3	4-1	1-1	Mike Vallery (138-42-1)		
2009	4A II	14	10-1	5-0	0-1	Mike Vallery (138-42-1)		
2010	4A II	14	3-7	2-5	0-0	Mike Wood (102-37)		
2011	4A II	14	9-5	5-2	3-1	Mike Wood (102-37)	State Quarterfinalist	
2012	3A I	16	12-2	5-1	4-1	Mike Wood (102-37)	State Semifinalist	
2013	3A I	16	14-1	6-0	5-1	Mike Wood (102-37)	State Finalist	
2014	4A I	9	10-1	5-0	1-1	Mike Wood (102-37)		
2015	4A I	9	11-1	5-0	1-1	Mike Wood (102-37)		
2016	4A I	9	10-2	6-0	1-1	Mike Wood (102-37)		
2017	4A I	9	10-4	5-2	2-1	Mike Wood (102-37)		
2018	4A I	10	4-8	2-3	0-1	Mike Wood (102-37)		
2019	4A I	10	8-3	3-2	0-1	Mike Wood (102-37)		
2020	4A I	9	11-3	5-1	3-1	Mike Wood (102-37)	State Quarterfinalist	
2021	4A I	9	11-2	6-1	2-1	Clint Fuller (46-11)		
2022	4A I	9	10-4	5-1	3-1	Clint Fuller (46-11)	State Quarterfinalist	
2023	4A I	9	12-2	6-0	3-1	Clint Fuller (46-11)	State Quarterfinalist	
2024	4A I	9	13-3	5-1	5-1	Clint Fuller (46-11)	State Finalist	
2025	4A I	9	14-2	5-1	5-1	Clint Fuller (46-11)	State Finalist	
2026	4A I	8				Clint Fuller (46-11)		
Totals			642-361-30	110-25 (Note: District record since 2004. Research into prior records is ongoing.)	61-35 (Note: Research into prior records is ongoing.)			

Table references: MaxPreps, Texas High School Football History, and Lone Star Football.

== Notable people ==
=== Alumni ===
- Kenta Bell (Class of 1995), Olympic track and field athlete
- Audrey Chase Hampton (Class of 2020), MLB Pitcher for the New York Yankees
- Van Cliburn (Class of 1951), world renowned piano virtuoso
- Bobby Cross (Class of 1948), NFL and CFL professional football player
- Wayne Daniels (Class of 2006), NFL professional football player
- Mel Gillis (Class of 1962), member of the Alaska House of Representatives
- Larry Hickman (Class of 1954), NFL and CFL professional football player
- John Hill (Class of 1940), lawyer, politician, judge, and World War II veteran
- Buddy Humphrey (Class of 1954), NFL professional football player
- Charles Hurwitz (Class of 1958), businessman and financier
- Eddie Jones (Class of 2006), NFL professional football player
- Bob Luman (Class of 1955), Country/Rockabilly singer; Rockabilly Hall and Texas Country Music Hall of Fame
- Jimmy Mankins (Class of 1943), World War II veteran and member of the Texas House of Representatives
- Tommy Merritt (Class of 1966), businessman and member of the Texas House of Representatives
- Vic Nyvall (Class of 1966), NFL professional football player
- Peter Rodriguez (Class of 1986), economist, professor, and academic administrator
- Ron Shepherd (Class of 1979), MLB professional Baseball player
- David Van Os (Class of 1968), civil rights activist, labor lawyer, and politician
- Ally Venable (Class of 2017), blues rock guitar player, singer, and songwriter

=== Faculty ===
- Eugene C. Elder - educator, politician, and 3rd Mayor of Kilgore
- John Heffner - television program co-host and pre-calculus educator
- Harold Mayo - football coach and college athletics administrator
- Prince Scott - professional football player and educator
