= Bobby Cross =

American gridiron football player (1931–1989)

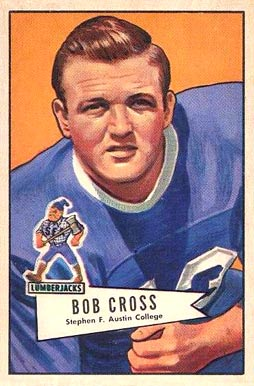
- Cross on a 1952 Bowman football card

No. 76, 60, 73, 57, 78, 71, 77
- Positions: Offensive tackle, defensive tackle

Personal information
- Born: July 4, 1931; Ranger, Texas, U.S.
- Died: June 18, 1989 (aged 57); Kilgore, Texas, U.S.
- Listed height: 6 ft 4 in (1.93 m)
- Listed weight: 240 lb (109 kg)

Career information
- High school: Kilgore
- College: Stephen F. Austin State (1948–1950)
- NFL draft: 1952: 9th round, 104th overall pick

Career history
- Chicago Bears (1952); Hamilton Tiger-Cats (1953); Los Angeles Rams (1954–1955); San Francisco 49ers (1956–1957); Chicago Cardinals (1958–1959); Dallas Cowboys (1960)*; Boston Patriots (1960)
- * Offseason or practice squad member only

Awards and highlights
- Grey Cup champion (1953); Little All-American (1951); All-LSC (1951)

Career NFL/AFL statistics
- Games played: 87
- Games started: 64
- Fumble recoveries: 5
- Stats at Pro Football Reference

Robert Joe Cross (July 4, 1931 – June 18, 1989) was an American professional football offensive lineman in the National Football League (NFL) for the Chicago Bears, Los Angeles Rams, San Francisco 49ers, and Chicago Cardinals. He also was a member of the Boston Patriots in the American Football League (AFL) and the Hamilton Tiger-Cats in the Canadian Football League (CFL). He played college football at Stephen F. Austin State University.

== Early life ==
Cross attended Kilgore High School, where he practiced football, basketball and track. He enrolled at Kilgore Junior College. He later accepted a football scholarship from Stephen F. Austin State University, where he became a three-year starter.

In 1948, he placed second in the Border Olympics shot put competition, a track-and-field event held in Laredo in which Southwest Conference teams also participated.

In 2002, he was inducted into the Kilgore College Athletics Hall of Fame.

== Professional career ==
=== Chicago Bears ===
Cross was selected by the Chicago Bears in the ninth round (104th overall) of the 1952 NFL draft. Although he was named a starter as a rookie at right tackle, at the end of the season he opted to sign with the Hamilton Tiger-Cats of the Canadian Football League.

=== Hamilton Tiger-Cats ===
In 1953, he was the starting left tackle for the Hamilton Tiger-Cats, while helping the team win the Grey Cup.

=== Los Angeles Rams ===
On May 8, 1954, while he was in the process of asking for reinstatement into the National Football League, The Bears traded him to the Los Angeles Rams in exchange for defensive end Larry Brink. He was a starter at left tackle. In the 1955 NFL Championship Game, he was moved to center to replace Leon McLaughlin who was sick with mumps.

On September 9, 1956, he was traded to the San Francisco 49ers in exchange for a third round draft choice (#27-George Strugar).

=== San Francisco 49ers ===
On August 31, 1958, after two seasons of playing at left tackle, he was traded to the Chicago Cardinals in exchange for a draft choice.

=== Chicago Cardinals ===
He played two seasons with the Chicago Cardinals. In 1959, he missed his first game in the NFL.

=== Dallas Cowboys ===
Cross was selected by the Dallas Cowboys in the 1960 NFL expansion draft. He was tried at offensive tackle and center, but was released before the start of the season.

=== Boston Patriots ===
On November 9, 1960, he was signed as a free agent by the Boston Patriots of the American Football League. He was a part of the franchise's inaugural season, playing in 4 games before being released on December 5.
