= Vic Nyvall =

American football player (born 1948)

No. 36
- Position: Running back

Personal information
- Born: April 29, 1948 (age 78); Kilgore, Texas, U.S.
- Listed height: 5 ft 10 in (1.78 m)
- Listed weight: 185 lb (84 kg)

Career information
- High school: Kilgore (Kilgore, Texas)
- College: Northwestern State
- NFL draft: 1970: undrafted

Career history
- New Orleans Saints (1970)
- Stats at Pro Football Reference

Victor Allen Nyvall (born April 29, 1948) is an American former professional football player who was a running back for the New Orleans Saints of the National Football League (NFL). He played college football at Northwestern State University.
