= Larry Hickman =

American gridiron football player (1935–2017)

No. 27, 30, 37
- Position: Fullback

Personal information
- Born: October 9, 1935; Spring Hill, Texas, U.S.
- Died: February 10, 2017 (aged 81); Tyler, Texas, U.S.
- Listed height: 6 ft 2 in (1.88 m)
- Listed weight: 227 lb (103 kg)

Career information
- High school: Kilgore (TX)
- College: Baylor (1955–1958)
- NFL draft: 1959: 3rd round, 31st overall pick

Career history
- Los Angeles Rams (1959)*; Chicago Cardinals (1959); Green Bay Packers (1960); Hamilton Tiger-Cats (1961–1962); Montreal Alouettes (1962); Toronto Argonauts (1963)
- * Offseason or practice squad member only

Awards and highlights
- Second-team All-SWC (1958)

Career NFL statistics
- Rushing yards: 40
- Rushing average: 3.3
- Receptions: 1
- Receiving yards: 11
- Stats at Pro Football Reference

Career CFL statistics
- Rushing yards: 1,265
- Rushing average: 5.4
- Receptions: 12
- Receiving yards: 112
- Touchdowns: 3

Lawrence Dean Hickman (October 9, 1935 – February 10, 2017) was a professional American football fullback in the National Football League (NFL) for the Chicago Cardinals and Green Bay Packers. He played college football at Baylor University.

== Early life ==
Hickman was born in Spring Hill, on October 10, 1935, to O.B. and Mattie Jane Hickman as the youngest of four boys, with brothers John, Warner and Waller. He acquired a love of music as a child, and sang for churches, banquets, weddings and theater productions all his life. Hickman attended Kilgore High School in Kilgore, Texas, where he played high school football at halfback and fullback as part of a dominant Bulldog running game with running back teammate Buddy Humphrey. He also lettered in baseball and basketball.

== College career ==
Along with Humphrey, Hickman accepted a football scholarship from Baylor University, where he majored in Business with a minor in Vocal Performance. He lettered for the Bears from 1955–58, earning all-Southwest Conference honors in 1958. He was named a member of the Baylor football all-1950s team and was inducted into the Baylor Hall of Fame in 1973. Hickman married the former Shirley Winn of Gladewater while attending Baylor.

During the 1957 Sugar Bowl, Tennessee guard Bruce Burnham and Baylor guard Charley Horton "got into a scuffle" on the ground. Burnham punched Horton a few times. Hickman then responded by kicking Burnham in the face, which sent him to the hospital. A doctor stated "I thought the boy would be gone before we got him off the field". Hickman was ejected and spent the rest of the game crying on the bench. He later apologized to Burnham in the hospital.

== Professional football career ==
After playing college football for Baylor, Hickman was selected in third round (31st overall) of the 1959 NFL draft by the Los Angeles Rams, rejoining Humphrey briefly before being traded to the Chicago Cardinals prior to the start of the 1959 season. He played two seasons in the NFL, one for the Cardinals (1959) and one for the Green Bay Packers (1960).

Hickman then went to the Canadian Football League where he played with three teams in three successive years from 1961 to 1963: the Hamilton Tiger Cats, Montreal Alouettes, and Toronto Argonauts. His best year as a running back was 1961, when he rushed for 447 yards and a 6.5 yards per carry average in Hamilton. That year, he played in the 49th Grey Cup game as Hamilton lost to the Winnipeg Blue Bombers in the first ever Grey Cup to ever go into overtime. Hickman suffered a badly sprained ankle in the game. Afterwards, he got progressively fewer chances to rush before retiring.

== Life after football ==
After professional football, Hickman joined Texas Power & Light (later TU Electric), working in numerous cities and positions for almost 30 years. He retired from TU Electric in 1993 as their Tyler District Manager, and lived in Tyler for the remainder of his life. He and his wife had two children; daughter Lesa and son Winn. Larry Hickman died on February 10, 2017, at the age of 81.
