= Charley Horton (guard) =

American football player (1936–2013)

No. 57, 67
- Positions: Guard, tackle

Personal information
- Born: November 30, 1936; Waco, Texas, U.S.
- Died: November 21, 2013 (aged 76); Irving, Texas, U.S.
- Listed height: 6 ft 2 in (1.88 m)
- Listed weight: 232 lb (105 kg)

Career information
- High school: Waco
- College: Baylor
- NFL draft: 1959: 2nd round, 18th overall pick

Career history
- Toronto Argonauts (1959); BC Lions (1959); Detroit Lions (1960)*
- * Offseason or practice squad member only

Charles Edgar Horton (November 30, 1936 – November 21, 2013) was an American professional football guard who played one season in the Canadian Football League (CFL) with the BC Lions and Toronto Argonauts. He played college football at Baylor University, and was selected by the Detroit Lions in the second round of the 1959 NFL draft.

== Early life and college ==
Charles Edgar Horton was born on November 30, 1936, in Waco, Texas. He attended Waco High School, where he was a letterman in football and track.

Horton played college football for the Baylor Bears of Baylor University. He was on the freshman team in 1955 and was a three-year letterman from 1956 to 1958. During the 1957 Sugar Bowl, Tennessee guard Bruce Burnham and Horton "got into a scuffle" on the ground. Burnham punched Horton a few times. Baylor player Larry Hickman then responded by kicking Burnham in the face, which sent him to the hospital. A doctor stated "I thought the boy would be gone before we got him off the field". Hickman was ejected and spent the rest of the game crying on the bench. He later apologized to Burnham in the hospital.

== Professional career ==
On December 1, 1958, Horton was selected by the Detroit Lions in the second round, with the 18th overall pick, of the 1959 NFL draft. In January 1960, Horton announced that he would instead play for the Toronto Argonauts of the Canadian Football League (CFL). In July 1959, he reported to Argonauts training camp at 240 pounds, 20 pounds over his college playing weight. Horton played in six games for the Argonauts during the 1959 season.

On September 26, 1959, Horton, and the negotiation rights to an unnamed player, were traded to the BC Lions for Al Dorow. Horton played in one game for the Lions before being waived on October 8, 1959.

On October 15, 1959, Horton signed a futures contract with the Detroit Lions for the 1960 season. He was released in September 1960.

== Personal life ==
Horton worked for Mobil/Exxon as a geophysicist before retiring in 1990. He lived in Irving, Texas, from 1962 until his death in 2013. He died on November 21, 2013, in Irving.
