= Buddy Humphrey =

American football player and coach (1935–1988)

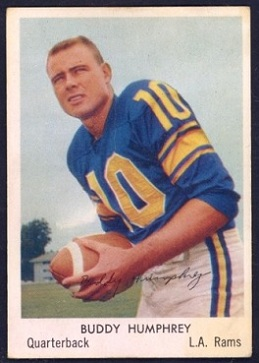
- Humphrey in 1959

No. 10, 11
- Position: Quarterback

Personal information
- Born: September 29, 1935; Dallas, Texas, U.S.
- Died: April 21, 1988 (aged 52); Gregg County, Texas, U.S.
- Listed height: 6 ft 1 in (1.85 m)
- Listed weight: 198 lb (90 kg)

Career information
- High school: Kilgore (Kilgore, Texas)
- College: Baylor
- NFL draft: 1959: 2nd round, 16th overall pick

Career history
- Los Angeles Rams (1959–1960); Dallas Cowboys (1961–1962); St. Louis Cardinals (1963–1965); Denver Broncos (1966)*; Houston Oilers (1966)
- * Offseason or practice squad member only

Awards and highlights
- Second-team All-SWC (1958)

Career NFL statistics
- Passing attempts: 175
- Passing completions: 87
- Completion percentage: 49.7%
- TD–INT: 4–12
- Passing yards: 1,094
- Passer rating: 48.6
- Stats at Pro Football Reference

Loyie Nawlin "Buddy" Humphrey (September 29, 1935 – April 21, 1988) was an American professional football player who was a quarterback in the National Football League (NFL) for the Los Angeles Rams, Dallas Cowboys, and St. Louis Cardinals. He also was a member of the Houston Oilers in the American Football League (AFL). He played college football for the Baylor Bears and was selected in the second round of the 1959 NFL draft.

== Early life ==
Humphrey attended Kilgore High School in Kilgore, Texas. He played high school football at quarterback and halfback. He was a part of a dominant tandem with halfback Larry Hickman. As a junior, he was switched to fullback. In his final year, he was moved to halfback. He also lettered in baseball and basketball.

== College career ==
Humphrey accepted a football scholarship from Baylor University, along with Hickman. He was an All-Conference player at quarterback. As a sophomore, he scored the winning touchdown on a quarterback sneak in Baylor's 1957 Sugar Bowl 13-7 victory, over the undefeated, highly-favored and No. 2-ranked University of Tennessee.

In 1958, he led the nation with 112 completions for 1,316 yards. In the season finale he passed for 387 yards and 5 touchdowns against Rice University, which was a school record that stood until 2006. As a junior and senior, his teams finished last in the Southwest Conference.

At the conclusion of his senior season, he played in the December 1958 North–South Shrine Game, where he had 5 touchdown passes and was named MVP, and the January 1959 Senior Bowl, where he was a co-captain of the South team.

In 2006, Humphrey was inducted into the Baylor Sports Hall of Fame.

== Professional career ==
Humphrey was selected by the Los Angeles Rams in the second round (16th overall) of the 1959 NFL draft, as result of a trade with the Washington Redskins. He was a backup quarterback (only one start) for the Rams during the 1959 and 1960 seasons. On November 8, 1961, he was waived to allow him to join the Dallas Cowboys.

In 1961 he joined the Dallas Cowboys, to replace an injured Don Meredith. He appeared in 2 games and completed one pass for 16 yards. He was released on September 11, 1962.

On June 7, 1963, he was traded by the Cowboys to the St. Louis Cardinals in exchange for tight end Hugh McInnis, where he was a backup quarterback for three seasons. In 1965, he started 3 games (all loses). He was released on August 15, 1966.

On August 30, 1966, he was signed by the Denver Broncos of the American Football League on a tryout basis. He was cut on September 12.

On September 13, 1966, he was signed by the American Football League's Houston Oilers. He played in one season as a backup, starting one game.

== Personal life ==
After his professional football career was over, Humphrey had a very successful career as a high school football coach and educator. He served as head coach, principal and athletic director for Kilgore High School. He was the head coach for Daingerfield High School, Stroman High School, and Pine Tree High School. He also was purchasing director at Kilgore Junior College.

On April 21, 1988, Humphrey died from a brain tumor in Gregg County, Texas.
