= Mike Martin (American politician) =

American politician (born 1952)

Michael Wayne "Mike" Martin

Member of the Texas House of Representatives from the 13th district
- In office January 13, 1981 – April 22, 1982
- Preceded by: James E. Mankins
- Succeeded by: James E. Mankins

Personal details
- Born: March 9, 1952 (age 74)
- Party: Republican
- Spouse(s): Debbie Martin (m. 1977; div. 1984) Richie Martin
- Children: 3
- Occupation: Electrical engineer

Military service
- Branch/service: United States Air Force (1975-1979)

Michael Wayne Martin, known as Mike Martin (born March 9, 1952), is a Republican former member of the Texas House of Representatives from District 13 in Longview in Gregg County, Texas. He served from January 1981 until his resignation in April 1982.

== Early life ==
Martin became a police officer in 1971. He served in the United States Air Force from 1975 through 1979.

== Shooting ==
On July 31, 1981 Martin was shot four times in his left arm. After the shooting Martin declared it was probably a well staged set up and that he had received threats in the previous weeks. Martin's cousin, Charles Geoff, later confessed to having staged Martin's shooting together with him, claims that Martin has always denied, calling his cousin a liar. Officials believed Geoff's testimony and went after both men. Martin initially fled, but Texas Rangers eventually apprehended Martin at his mother's farmhouse just outside Longview, where he was found hiding in a stereo cabinet. Martin pleaded guilty in April 1982 and was convicted of misdemeanor perjury and paid a $2000 fine, though his lawyer said he did not admit staging the shooting.

== Afterward ==
Martin resigned from the Texas House of Representatives and in the spring of 1982, voters in a special election returned Mankins to the vacant House seat.

In 1984, he and his wife, Debbie Martin, later of Garland, Texas, divorced.

In July 1986, Martin left with his two children, Michael Trent Martin (born 1978) and Arianna Martin (born 1981) to live and work in Wellington, New Zealand. A federal case was brought over the custody, and the Federal Bureau of Investigation allowed him to return the children to the United States late in 1988.

Texas House of Representatives
| Preceded by James E. Mankins | Texas State Representative from District 13 (Gregg County); 1981–1982 | Succeeded by James E. Mankins |
