= 1957 Sugar Bowl =

American college football game

- 23rd Sugar Bowl
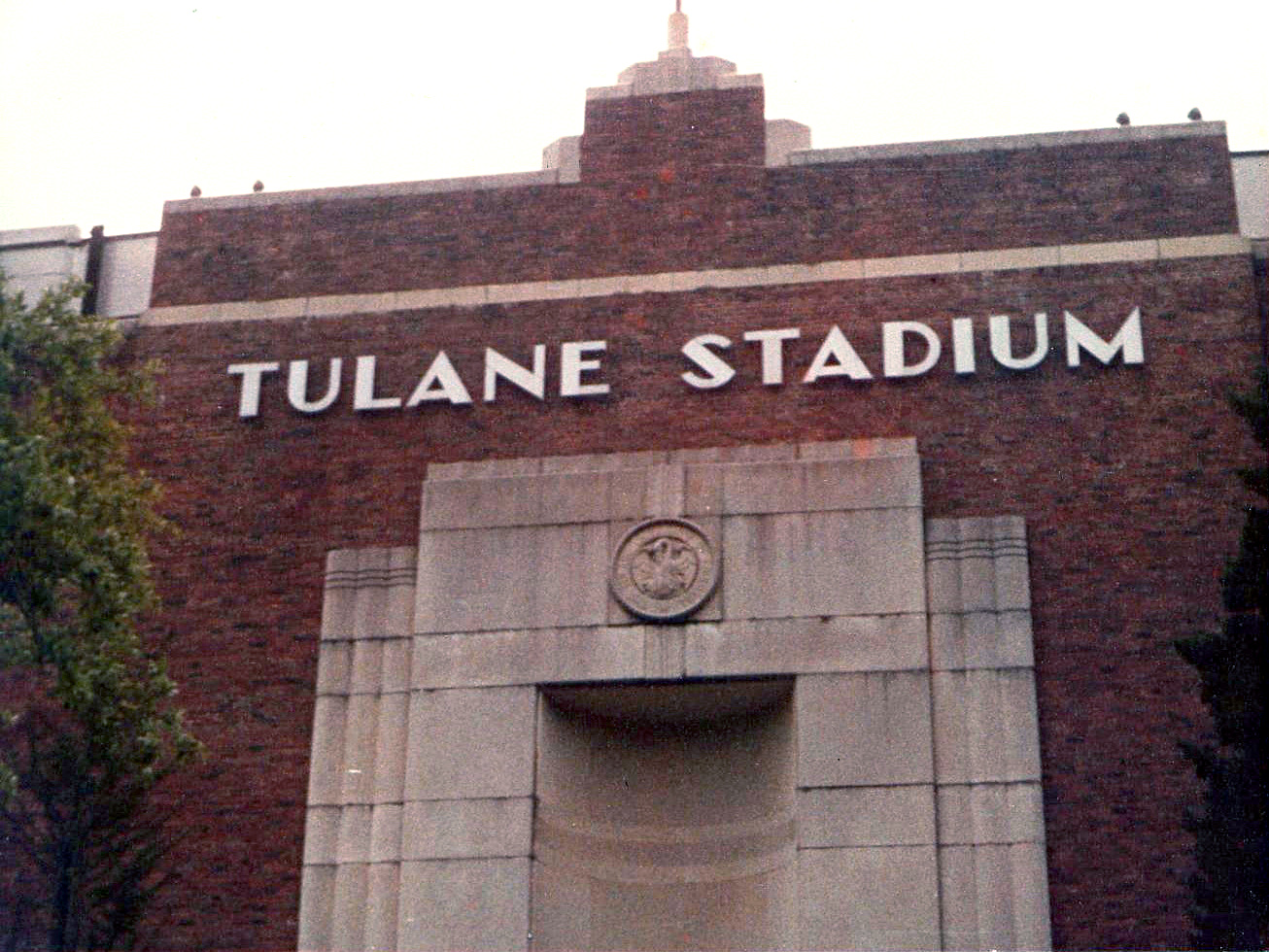
- Tulane Stadium in New Orleans, Louisiana, hosted the Sugar Bowl.
| Baylor Bears | Tennessee Volunteers |
| (8–2) | (10–0) |
| SWC | SEC |
| 13 | 7 |
| Head coach: Sam Boyd | Head coach: Bowden Wyatt |
| AP / Coaches; 11 / 11 | AP / Coaches; 2 / 2 |
| | 1 | 2 | 3 | 4 | Total |
|---|---|---|---|---|---|
| Baylor | 0 | 6 | 0 | 7 | 13 |
| Tennessee | 0 | 0 | 7 | 0 | 7 |
- Date: January 1, 1957
- Season: 1956
- Stadium: Tulane Stadium
- Location: New Orleans, Louisiana
- Referee: Fred Koster (SEC; split crew: SEC, SWC)

United States TV coverage
- Network: ABC
- Announcers: Ray Scott, Herman Hickman

The 1957 Sugar Bowl to the featured the second-ranked Tennessee Volunteers and the 11th-ranked Baylor Bears. Behind a strong defense, the Baylor Bears upset undefeated Tennessee.

After a scoreless first quarter of play, Baylor scored on a 12-yard scoring pass from quarterback Bobby Jones to Jerry Marcontell to take a 6–0 lead. The score was set up by Del Shofner's 54-yard run. In the third stanza, quarterback Johnny Majors scored on a 1-yard touchdown run to put Tennessee on top at 7–6. In the fourth quarter, Buddy Humphrey's one-yard touchdown run gave Baylor a 13–7 advantage. Baylor's defense provided the difference as they didn't allow any more points.

Shofner was named Sugar Bowl MVP.

During the game, Tennessee guard Bruce Burnham and Baylor guard Charley Horton "got into a scuffle" on the ground. Burnham punched Horton a few times. Baylor player Larry Hickman then responded by kicking Burnham in the face, which sent him to the hospital. A doctor stated "I thought the boy would be gone before we got him off the field". Hickman was ejected and spent the rest of the game crying on the bench. He later apologized to Burnham in the hospital.
