= Mount Tabor Indian Community =

Cultural heritage group in Texas

- Named after: Mount Tabor
- Type: 501(c)(3) organization
- Tax ID no.: EIN 92-2886370 (Mt. Tabor Indian Heritage Center); Defunct EIN 47-2350957
- Purpose: A23: Cultural, ethnic awareness
- Headquarters: Mineola, Texas
- Location: United States
- Official language: English
- President: J.C. Thompson (2018)
- Website: mounttaborcommunity.org

The Mount Tabor Indian Community (also Texas Cherokees and Associate Bands of the Mount Tabor Indian Community) is a cultural heritage group located in Rusk County, Texas. There was a historical Mount Tabor Indian Community dating from the 19th century. The current organization established a nonprofit organization in Texas in 2015.

The modern Mount Tabor Indian Community is a controversial group claiming Native American heritage and to be a continuous community of the historical Mount Tabor Indian Community in Texas. The original Mount Tabor Indian Community ceased to exist in 1975 after a no-vote by the Cherokee Nation in Oklahoma. The modern Mount Tabor Indian Community made national news when leaders of Federally recognized Tribes such as the Cherokee Nation and Delaware Nation publicly denounced the group at the "Peace Circle" statue unveiling in Grapevine, Texas honoring, among others, an alleged member of the Mount Tabor Indian Community.

== Community founder JC Thompson ==
JC Thompson founded Mount Tabor Indian Community in 1997. Prior to the founding of this community JC Thompson belonged to the "Northern Cherokee Nation." The "Northern Cherokee Nation" are a controversial group listed as part of an ongoing investigation by the L.A. Times and the State of Missouri for allegedly acquiring over 300 million dollars in state funds set aside for minority businesses and allocating those funds to people claiming Native American ancestry while lacking any official Federal or State Recognition.

== Origins of the community and name ==
The Mount Tabor Indian Community (also recorded as Texas Cherokees and Associate Bands of the Mount Tabor Indian Community) is a cultural heritage group founded in 1997 by JC Thompson and located in Rusk County, Texas. JC Thompson registered this group as a non-profit in 2015 for the purpose of "A23: Cultural, Ethnic Awareness." The community takes its name from a historical community once attached to the Cherokee Nation. In 1972, the Cherokee Nation was reorganizing and grew politically distant from the original and historical Mount Tabor Indian Community. With the approval of the 1975 Cherokee Nation constitution, the Texas Cherokees and Associated bands ceased to exist in Oklahoma without a vote.

The name of this now non-existent Mount Tabor Indian Community and or Texas Cherokees and Associated Bands was then taken by JC Thompson in 1997 to form a modern group which he claimed was the continuation of the historical groups it was named after. In 1998, one year after the group was formed, this new group approved a constitution, and JC Thompson began a campaign of advertising to the group and the public that Mount Tabor Indian Community would qualify for Federal Recognition. According to the public address on Jan. 1, 2025, by current Mount Tabor Indian Community chairwoman Cheryl Giordano, JC Thompson was aware that the Mount Tabor Indian Community did not actually qualify for Federal Recognition even as he pursued it publicly. In 2015, JC Thompson registered the Mount Tabor Indian Heritage Center, a 501(c)(3) nonprofit organization, based in Kilgore, Texas. It was registered in 2023 in Mineola, Texas. The community has existed mostly as an online community with no regular meetings or events.

== Community claims ==
The modern community identifies as being of Cherokee descent as well as Choctaw, Chickasaw, and Muscogee descent. However, in the 2025 public address by Cheryl Giordano, the chairwoman of the Mount Tabor Indian Community, Giordano stated that many of the members of the community she chairs, including founder JC Thompson, have unproven Native American ancestry. In this same address, Giordano stated that the application documents for registry within the community are claimed to have been damaged, moved, or stolen by founder JC Thompson's son Jesse Thompson and are no longer available. Giordano has accused founder JC Thompson of false narratives regarding the community's history and accused Jesse Thompson of obstruction and misconduct concerning the communities' historical, enrollment, and banking documents, as well as propagating the aforementioned false narratives of his father. Giordano stated publicly that the Mount Tabor Indian Community is a modern community and in no way represents any continuous community or government related to the historical Texas Cherokees and Associated Bands or the historical Mount Tabor Indian Community which ceased to exist in the 19th and early 20th centuries respectively. Giordano claims that the Mount Tabor Indian Community is a modern group of mostly Native American people who are ancestors of historical communities that JC Thompson brought together to form a new group in order to claim continuity from historical groups.

== Leadership ==
J.C. Thompson served as chairman from the founding of the group in 1997 until 1998, when Terry Jean Easterly was selected to lead the community. Easterly served from 1998 to 2000 and was succeeded by Peggy Dean-Atwood. Atwood served through 2001. After her resignation, JC Thompson became Chairman for the second time and served as chairman for 18 years. Thompson was succeeded by William Ellis "Billy" Bean. Chairman Bean served only 13 months, ending on September 2, 2019, when he was removed from office for the misuse of community funds. He was succeeded by Cheryl Giordano. Giordano had previously served as Operations Coordinator on the Mount Tabor Executive Committee. On New Year's Day in 2025, Giordano issued a public address, as chair, requesting assistance from the Federal Bureau of Investigation, the Internal Revenue Service, federal and state recognized tribes, Native American advocacy groups, the Mount Tabor Indian Community, and the public at large to assist her in taking on corruption within the Mount Tabor Indian Community. After this alleged corruption was made public, Jesse Thompson, son of founder JC Thompson, formed a splinter group called "Descendants of Mount Tabor" and went offline.

== Community reception among federally and state recognized Native American tribes ==
Reception for this community from federally and state recognized Native American tribes and the general public have been largely negative. There was a historical Mount Tabor Indian Community dating from the 19th century, which this modern group claims descent from, but this claim was dismissed publicly by the Cherokee Nation at the Grapevine "Peace Circle" statue unveiling on September 18, 2021. Representative Catherine Grey of the Cherokee Nation who participated in the "Peace Circle" ceremony stated in a report published nationally by ABC news that the Cherokee Nation would not have attended the event if they had information that the Mount Tabor Indian Community would be honored there. In that same article, Deborah Dotson, President of the Delaware Nation, a federally recognized tribe based in Oklahoma, stated about the Mount Tabor Indian Community that "We call them C-PAINs: Corporations Posing As Indigenous Nations. They compete with us for grants. They receive donations. The state will give them tax breaks." Chuck Hoskin Jr., the principal chief of the Cherokee Nation, stated about Mount Tabor Indian Community that "They're one of a large number of organizations across the country that pose as Indian tribes and seek some form of recognition." On New Years Day, 2025, Chairwoman of the Mount Tabor Indian Community, Cheryl Giordano, gave a public address stating that the modern Mount Tabor Indian Community was in fact only a heritage group and in no way represented any continuation of the historical Mount Tabor Indian Community of the early 20th century and or its predecessor the Texas Cherokees and Associated Bands of the 19th century. Giordano accused Mount Tabor Indian Community founder, the now deceased JC Thompson, of propagating false narratives about the community to the community itself and the general public regarding their historicity. Giordano's public address confirmed much of the information stated by the Chiefs, Presidents, and representatives of the Federally Recognized Native American Tribes present at the "Peace Circle" ceremony.

== Texas resolutions ==
The Mount Tabor Indian Community is not a Federally Recognized or State Recognized Native American Tribe. They have been issued a congratulatory bill from Texas which stated a contribution to Texas by descendants of a Native American group. According to current Chairwoman Cheryl Giordano in her public address, founder JC Thompson and other members have used congratulatory bill as a claim of state recognition. The state of Texas, where the Mount Tabor Indian Community is registered as a heritage center and non-profit, currently has no Bureau of Indian Affairs and therefore is unable to grant State Recognition to Native American tribes.

The current Texas State resolutions and congratulatory bills for Mount Tabor Indian Community are in danger of being cancelled or revoked as Chairwoman Giordano has now made public the fact that certain genealogies and lineages cited in order to obtain these honors may not be legitimate. Giordano claims she is currently attempting to correct this misinformation with the State of Texas and have the bills edited or removed.

- Texas Senate Resolution 384, a congratulatory resolution, passed March 17, 2015
- Texas Senate Concurrent Resolution 25, a congratulatory resolution, passed May 10, 2017
- Texas Senate Bill 2363, sponsored by Senator Bryan Hughes (R), to establish state-recognition for the Mount Tabor Indian Community, introduced on March 8, 2019, died March 21, 2019
