= Kilgore College Rangerettes =

Precision dance team from Texas, US

Coordinates: 32.377056°N 94.872600°W

- "Beauty Knows No Pain"

General information
- Name: Kilgore College Rangerettes
- Founder: Gussie Nell Davis
- Location: Kilgore, Texas, United States
- Website: Rangerette.com

Senior staff
- Director: Dana Blair
- Assistant Director: Shelley Wayne

Artistic staff
- Choreographers: Shelley Wayne, Angela Falcone Aulds

Other
- Official school: Kilgore College
- Formation: 19 September 1940; 85 years ago
- Membership: 64-72
- Type: Precision Dance Team

The Kilgore College Rangerettes, also known simply as the Rangerettes, are the world's first women's precision drill team, from Kilgore College in Kilgore, Texas, United States. They were created by Gussie Nell Davis in 1940. The Rangerettes have performed in 76 Cotton Bowl game halftimes in a row (Jan 1951-Jan 2026), and make regular appearances at NFL pre-game and half-time shows for the Dallas Cowboys and Houston Texans. The Rangerettes perform at Kilgore College football games, and in many other athletic and special events, including the Cotton Bowl game, the Macy's Thanksgiving Day Parade, and five presidential inaugurations. They have taken several world tours since the 1970s, including South America, Hong Kong, Macao, South Korea, Romania, France, Canada, Japan, Italy, Switzerland, England, Scotland, and Ireland.

== History ==
The Kilgore College Rangerettes were founded by Gussie Nell Davis, a physical education instructor from Farmersville, Texas who had previously taken an all-girl's group called the "Flaming Flashes" from being a simple high school pep-squad to an elaborately performing drum and bugle corps in Greenville, Texas. In 1939, Davis was hired away from Greenville High School by the Kilgore College Dean, Dr. B. E. Masters. Masters wanted something different than the traditional women's drum and bugle corps. He wanted something that would increase female enrollment at the college but would also keep fans in their seats during football half time shows instead of drinking alcohol under the stands. Opting early to forgo the use of musical instruments, Davis focused her new team on dance and choreography, later naming the group the Rangerettes. The Rangerettes became a success early on despite criticisms of their uniforms featuring skirts above the knee, which by the 1960s had become much shorter. Davis served as the group's director for thirty-nine years, until June 1979.

There is disagreement within the Rangerette alumni group and others in the dance team industry regarding the date of the first Rangerette performance. Several sources have it as September 12, 1940, but in an oral interview with Texas State University history professor Dan K. Utley, Davis confirmed the first performance date as September 19, 1940, as does the book, A History of Kilgore College, 1935-1981.

=== Directors, assistant directors, and choreographers ===
==== Directors ====
- Gussie Nell Davis – 1940–1979
- Deana Bolton Covin - 1979–1993
- Dana Blair – 1993 to present

==== Assistant directors and choreographers ====
- Denard Haden – Choreographer, 1947–1978
- Peggy Crowder – Assistant Director
- Barbara "Pill" Harmon –Assistant Director
- Deana Bolton Covin – Assistant Director, 1972–1979
- Ruth Flynn Choreographer, 1980–1984
- Laura Davis – Choreographer, 1983–1984; Assistant Director and Choreographer, 1983–1986
- Dana Blair – Assistant Director and Choreographer, 1986–1993
- Shelley Wayne – Assistant Director and Choreographer, 1993 to present

== Performances and appearances ==
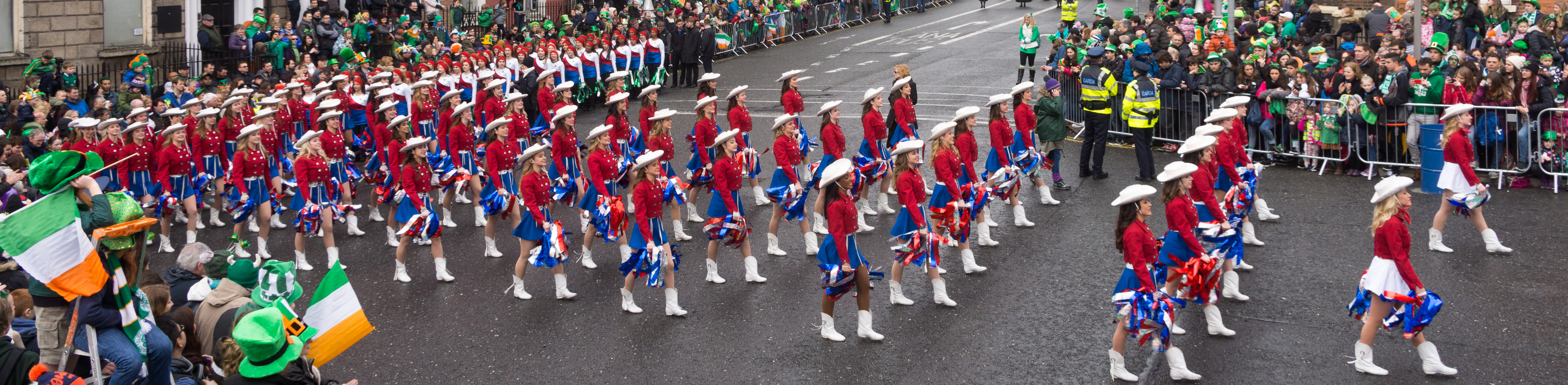

A partial list of major performances over the past 20 years

- Nov 2022 - 96th Annual Macy's Thanksgiving Day Parade, New York City
- Dec 2021 - 80th Anniversary Pearl Harbor Memorial Ceremony, Honolulu, Hawaii
- Nov 2021 - 95th Annual Macy's Thanksgiving Day Parade, New York City
- Jun 2021 - Virginia International Tattoo, Norfolk, Virginia
- Nov 2019 - Birmingham Tattoo, Birmingham, England
- Jul 2019 - Festival Bande, Modena, Italy
- Nov 2018 - 92nd Annual Macy's Thanksgiving Day Parade, New York City
- Jul 2018 - Basel Tattoo, Basel, Switzerland
- Mar 2018 – Contest of Champions final awards ceremony, Orlando, Florida
- Jan 2017 - Texas State Society Black Tie & Boots Ball, Washington, D.C., for the inauguration of Donald Trump
- Dec 2016 - 75th Anniversary Pearl Harbor Memorial Ceremony, Honolulu, Hawaii
- Nov 2016 - 90th Macy's Thanksgiving Day Parade, New York City
- Mar 2015 - Saint Patrick's Day Parade, Dublin, Ireland
- Jan 2013 - Texas State Society Black Tie & Boots Ball, Washington, D.C. for the second inauguration of Barack Obama
- Dec 2011 - 70th Anniversary Pearl Harbor Memorial Ceremony, Honolulu, Hawaii
- Jan 2009 - Texas State Society Black Tie & Boots Ball, Washington, D.C. for the first inauguration of Barack Obama
- Jan 2005 - Texas State Society Black Tie & Boots Ball, Washington, D.C. for the second inauguration of George W. Bush
- Jan 2001 - Texas State Society Black Tie & Boots Ball, Washington, D.C. for the first inauguration of George W. Bush

== Revels ==
Rangerette Revels is an annual variety show with a central theme performed at Dodson Auditorium on the Kilgore College campus. Revels features performances by Rangerettes with several dances choreographed by nationally known choreographers such as J.T. Horenstein and Tracie Stanfield. There are five showings within the week of the program, and it is the last major performance of the year for the group. The revenue generated by the shows make it one of Kilgore College's highest grossing events. The last segment of the show is always an extended production kick routine, featuring all of the Rangerettes in the traditional uniform. Approximately 6,000 people see the show each year, with many people traveling from out of town to attend and provide a boost to Kilgore's economy.

== Officers ==
Rangerette officers are five sophomores (one captain and four lieutenants) who make up the student leadership of the organization. They are chosen by the directors and an outside panel of judges, with assistance from their classmates, and are announced at Showoffs, the week before the start of fall semester classes. The officer uniform differs from the standard team uniform in that it is solid white, accompanied by a neck scarf, blue for the captain and red for lieutenants.

== Managers ==
Rangerette managers are male students from Kilgore College selected by the team to help with setting up and removing props and stage equipment for productions and half-time performances. Managers occasionally participate in performances, traditionally performing a comedic routine during Rangerette Revels. Managers who have an extensive dance background may perform in more traditional dance performances.

== Alumni support ==
Rangerettes Forever is an alumni organization that participates in various support programs for the team.

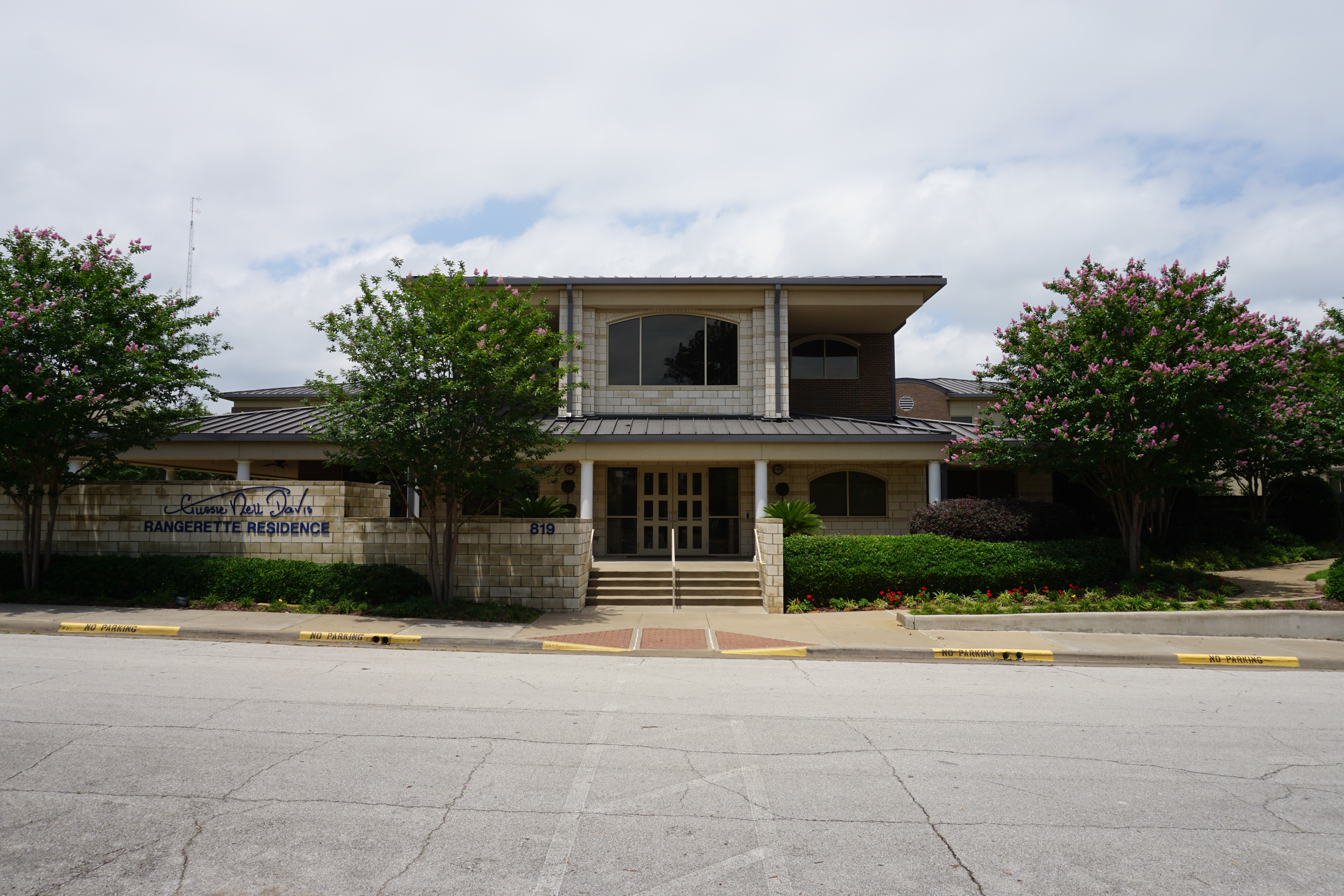
Gussine Nell Davis Rangerette Residence

In July 2005, the Zwick Foundation provided Kilgore College with a $3.5 million grant for design and construction of a new dormitory exclusively for use by the Rangerettes. The residence was completed in August 2006 for the 2006–2007 school year, and was formally dedicated in a ceremony a few months later. Kathryn Heller Zwick is a Rangerette from Longview, Texas, who attended Kilgore College and performed with the team from 1976 to 1978. Zwick's daughter, Lauren Gibler, was also a Rangerette from 2007 to 2009.

During the week of Revels 2019 (April 10–13), a donation of $1,000,000 was made to the Mike Miller Rangerette Fund to complete a permanent operating endowment for the Rangerettes. The anonymous donor was a Kilgore College graduate whose wife is a former Rangerette.

On Saturday, October 19, 2019, a former Kilgore College Rangerette and her husband donated a $3.5 million estate gift to fund scholarships for the Rangerette organization. The trust is set up to provide scholarships for Rangerettes and Rangerette Managers who meet the endowment's academic criteria.

== Popular culture ==
A Kilgore College Rangerette. Photo by Carol M. Highsmith.

The Rangerettes have been featured in articles in several media publications, including: ESPN,The New York Times, CNN, Life Magazine, Sports Illustrated, Newsweek, Esquire, Texas Monthly, The Saturday Evening Post, Popular Mechanics, Texas Highways, and the Texas State Travel Guide.

The Angelette Song from The Best Little Whorehouse in Texas features a drill team performance that parodies the Rangerettes

In the February 14, 2020, comic strip Over the Hedge, the Rangerettes were mentioned as sending a Valentine's Day card to one of the characters.

=== Movies ===
==== Sweethearts of the Gridiron ====
In anticipation of the organization's 75th anniversary, filmmaker Chip Hale followed the Rangerettes for a year, creating the 2015 documentary Sweethearts of the Gridiron. It highlights their debut at a 1940 football halftime show, and their rigorous tryout process.

==== Other ====
The Rangerettes have made cameo appearances in the films Seven Wonders of the World (1956), Semi-Tough (1977), and Johnny Be Good (1988).

== Controversy and criticism ==
Until 1973 there were no African American members of the team. According to the Texas State Historical Association, Davis said she would "be receptive when a qualified black tried out." The Rangerettes selected their first black team member, Freddie Goosby Evans, in 1973, and their first black officer, Briana McLaughlin, in 2012.

Some critics have "expressed dismay at the emphasis on physical attractiveness and rigorous and authoritarian training." Davis countered, "that there was nothing wrong in learning self-confidence, discipline, cooperation, and the ability to perform precision dance, along with poise, etiquette, and personal grooming".

In the late afternoon of December 29, 2016, there was an armed home invasion and kidnapping at Rangerette Director Dana Blair's home. The assailant kidnapped Blair's daughter, who at the time was a freshman Rangerette. Blair's daughter escaped her captor a little over an hour later. The assailant, Nancy Alice Motes, was arrested on a charge of aggravated kidnapping and released on $500,000 bond on December 30, 2016.

On June 22, 2017, Motes was indicted by a Gregg County Grand Jury, and faced first degree felonies in three charges encompassed in two counts for aggravated kidnapping. The first count included two charges: aggravated kidnapping with intent to terrorize and aggravated kidnapping with a deadly weapon. The second count had one count of aggravated kidnapping by deadly force.

On December 21, 2018, Blair's attorney filed a civil lawsuit against Motes seeking monetary relief of between $200,000 and $1 million.

On January 22, 2019, a start date of April 15, 2019, was set for the criminal trial against Motes.

On April 29, 2019, Motes pleaded guilty to two counts of aggravated kidnapping, one with a deadly weapon and one with deadly force. She was sentenced to two concurrent 5-year terms and had to serve at least half of her 5-year sentence before she was eligible for parole.

On July 1, 2021, Judge Alfonso Charles ordered Motes to pay Blair and her daughter $400,000 in compensatory damages and $175,000 in punitive damages.

Motes was granted parole in November 2021 after serving two and a half years of her five year sentence.

== Notable former Rangerettes ==
- Alice Lon
- Erin Cummings
- Julia Morales

== See also ==
- Majorette (dancer)
- Drill Team
- Dance Team
- Kilgore College
