= Jimmy Mankins =

American politician

James Earl Mankins Sr. (February 9, 1926 – August 20, 2013) was an American businessman and politician.

Born in Electra, Texas, Mankins served in the United States Army Air Forces during World War II. Mankins owned a trucking business in Kilgore, Texas. He served in the Texas House of Representatives from 1975 to 1985 as a Democrat. Mankins was defeated by Mike Martin in the 1980 election cycle. After Martin resigned the District 13 seat, Mankins won a special election to return to the state house. Mankins died in Longview, Texas.

Mankins's son and namesake was indicted in 1995, after an investigation into the Kentucky Fried Chicken murders. Charges against Mankins Jr. were dismissed after DNA evidence failed to show that Mankins Jr. was involved in the crime. By a 2003 court order, his indictment was expunged from non-investigatory records of the KFC murders case, although Mankins Jr. remained imprisoned at the time on separate drug charges.
