= John Martin Thompson =

John Martin Thompson (c. 1829 – 1907) was a lumberman, Native American tribal and civic leader, born in the old Cherokee Nation prior to removal in what is now Bartow County, Georgia, USA. He was the son of Benjamin Franklin Thompson, a South Carolinian of Scot-Irish descent, and Annie Martin, a mixed blood Cherokee. She was the daughter of Judge John Martin, the first Chief Justice of the Cherokee Nation and Nellie McDaniel.

== Before the war ==
In 1848, Thompson's family left the Cherokee Nation in Indian Territory to settle in Rusk County, Texas. B.F. Thompson initially purchased 10,000 acres (40 km^{2}) in the spring of 1844 near present-day Laird Hill, Texas, on which the family made its home. J.M. Thompson got his formal education, along with his brother William Wirt Thompson, at the Western Military College, then located at Georgetown, Kentucky. The brothers spent two years at the college before returning to east Texas and becoming deeply involved in the families plantation.

== American Civil War ==
Thompson served in the Confederate Army, and left two slaves running his flour mill. He returned after the war to his family poor after his slaves had departed.

== Reconstruction ==
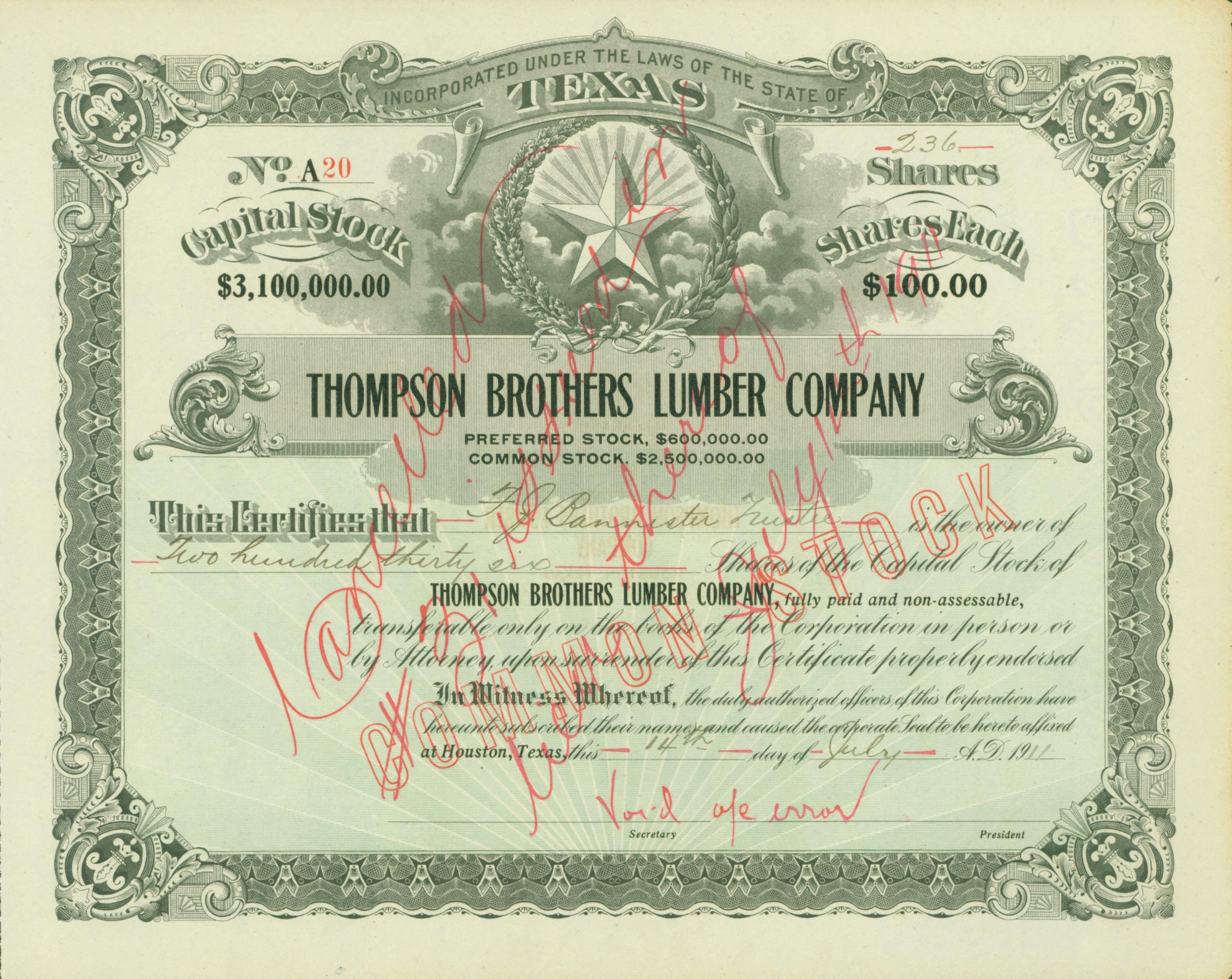
Share of the Thompson Brothers Lumber Company, issued 14 July 1911

Following the American Civil War, J.M. Thompson became one of the largest lumbermen in Texas. During the reconstruction era and into the early twentieth centuries Thompson along with his sons built their vast holdings in timber through a series of sound business decisions. In 1881, they left the Rusk County area, moving operations into Trinity County in order to market their product via the Missouri–Kansas–Texas Railroad. They facilitated their marketing campaigns by developing connections to retail lumberyards. Further, they organized a series of companies to expedite and manage their ever-growing timber empire. Thus were formed the Thompson and Tucker Lumber Company followed by the J. M. Thompson Lumber Company, the Thompson Brothers Lumber Company, and finally the Thompson and Ford Lumber Company. By 1907, the various companies owned over 149,000 acres (600 km^{2}) of land while operating mills in communities such as Willard, Doucette and Grayburg. In 1906, the company relocated all corporate interests to Houston.

== Later life ==
The settlement he lived in was named "Mt. Taber". Following the death of William Penn Adair in 1880, until his own death in 1907. He was succeeded as Executive Committee Chairman of the Texas Cherokees and Associate Bands by Chief John Ellis Bean and shortly thereafter by Chairman Claude Muskrat.

=== Family ===
His business successor was his son Hoxie Harry Thompson. It was H.H. Thompson who sold 94,126 acres (380.91 km^{2}) to the United States Forest Service for $12.50 an acre. These lands eventually formed the largest part of the Davy Crockett National Forest. By 1960, Hoxie Thompson had sold neally all of the Thompson lands, but maintained most of the mineral rights.

== See also ==
- Stand Watie
- William Penn Adair
- Yowani Choctaws

== Notes ==
=== Sources ===
- Edward Everett Dale and Gaston Litton, Cherokee Cavaliers: Forty Years of Cherokee History As Told in the Correspondence of the Ridge-Watie-Boudinot Family, 1939, University of Oklahoma Press; ISBN 0-8061-2721-X, 13: 978-0806127217
- Thomas D. Isern and Raymond Wilson, "Lone Star: The Thompson Timber Interests of Texas", Red River Valley Historical Review, #7, 1981
- Thompson Collection, Stephen F. Austin University, Nacogdoches, Texas
- Thomas D. Isern, Handbook of Texas Online: John Martin Thompson
- Republic of Texas Treaties; Treaty of Bowles Village February 23, 1836, Texas State Historical Society, Austin, Texas
- Treaty of Birds Fort September 29, 1843, Texas State Historical Society, Austin, Texas
- Dr. Emmet Starr, Starr's History of the Cherokee Indians
- George Morrison Bell Sr., Genealogy of Old and New Cherokee Families
- Mary Whatley Clarke, Chief Bowles and Texas Cherokees (Chapter XI, Cherokee Claims to Land), University of Oklahoma Press, ISBN 0806134364, ISBN 978-0806134369
- Texas-Cherokees vs United States Docket 26, 26 Ind Cl Comm. 78 (1971)
