= Gussie Nell Davis =

Founder of the Kilgore College Rangerettes

- Born: November 4, 1906; Farmersville, Texas, U.S.
- Died: December 21, 1993
- Resting place: Farmersville Cemetery
- Education: College of Industrial Arts (BA); University of Southern California (MS)
- Occupations: teacher, choreographer

Gussie Nell Davis (November 4, 1906 – December 21, 1993) was an American teacher and choreographer best known as the founder of the Kilgore College Rangerettes, who in September 1940 became the first all-girls drill team to perform on a college football field with the forward vision of Miss Davis. The organization created a unique combination of dance moves and precision drills that quickly earned them the reputation not only as the originators of dance/drill teams, but also as the best in the world, with the highest kicks in the world. Known for their high kicks and the jump splits, the organization has traveled around the world, has entertained millions and spurred a multi-billion-dollar dance/drill team industry worldwide.

== Biography ==
Davis was born on Nov. 4, 1906, in Farmersville, Texas. She was the daughter of Robert Augustus and Mattie Lavinia (née Callaway) Davis. Davis went to public schools in Farmersville, and enrolled at the Texas Woman's University (then the College of Industrial Arts) in 1923, where she advanced an intention to become a concert pianist. Her mother taught her music from an early age, but her dancing style was not widely accepted in the South-Central United States of the early 20th century. As a result, she switched her studies from music to physical education, going against the wishes of both her parents. Davis graduated in 1927 with a Bachelor of Arts degree, and began her professional career the following year at Greenville High School as an instructor of physical education, and pep squad sponsor.

During her first year in Greenville, the pep-squad, known as the Flaming Flashes, did stunts and a little marching. Over the next ten years the team's activities evolved and became more elaborate, including different drills with rhythm and dance steps to music. Wooden batons were added when Davis commissioned the school's nearest furniture maker to make them, then finally drums and bugles courtesy of Mr. Letcher Stark from Jefferson High School in Port Arthur, Texas. What started simply as a pep-squad was now a full blown drum and bugle corps.

Davis received a master's degree in science from the University of Southern California in 1938. Kilgore College president Dean B. E. Masters hired Davis the following year to form a group that would keep football spectators in their seats during halftime, rather than consuming alcohol and brawling under the stands. President Masters had an additional goal of increasing the college's female enrollment. The group, called the Kilgore College Rangerettes, first performed in September 1940, and were the first all-girls dance-drill team in the United States to perform during the half-time periods of college football games. Davis was the group's sole choreographer until 1948, when she hired East Texas-based Denard Haden to assist her. She later hired accompanist Hazel Stewart, the team's long-time sponsor L. N. Crim, and assistants Peggy Coghlan, Barbara Harmon, and Deana Bolton. Alongside her work, Davis acted as a consultant, judged drill-team competitions, was a member of the National Drill Team Directors Association, and was part of the Fiesta International board of directors. Davis, with the retired director of the SMU Mustang Band Irving Dreibrodt, founded the American Drill Team Schools which gives instruction to drill teams across the United States.

A disciplinarian, Davis built the Rangerettes into a self-confident squad. She directed routines that were routinely more athletic and aerobic, and the squad were featured extensively in the press. She retired in 1979 but remained the group's godmother. She was hospitalized in December 1993 and died just after midnight on December 21. Davis was buried at Farmersville Cemetery.

== Legacy ==
Davis's work created a multi-billion industry that encompasses multiple uniform and prop companies, drill camps worldwide, specialist choreographers and travel agencies dedicated to the drill-team-dance style she built upon. She chose not to marry or have children; she told the Irving Daily News in 1979: "The Rangerettes is [sic] my child". Davis was honored with the Gussie Nell Day in Kilgore in 1964 and in Farmersville six years later. It was followed up with a Texas-statewide celebration in 1979. She was named the 1969 Texas Woman of the Year by the Texas State Civitans. Davis was named an honorary citizen of Fort Worth and received a State of Texas House of Representatives Certificate of Citation. She was inducted into the Texas Women's Hall of Fame in 1989. In 2006, a former Rangerette, Kathryn Heller Zwick and her husband Nick, donated $3.5 million to help the college build the Gussie Nell Davis Residence Hall – a testament to the legacy of young women whose lives Davis touched and helped prepare for life beyond college.

In 1975 the Houston Contemporary Museum of Art honored Davis for creating a "living form" of art. Davis served as the group's director for forty years, until June 1979.

In 1999 she became an inductee of the Cotton Bowl Hall of Fame, recognized for her exceptional contributions to collegiate drill teams. Her pioneering work in developing precision performance standards has left a lasting legacy in collegiate sports and pageantry. Her induction into the Hall of Fame underscores the significant impact she has had on the cultural and athletic traditions of the Cotton Bowl.
