= East Texas Oil Field =

Oil and gas field in east Texas

Coordinates: 32°23′8″N 94°52′7″W

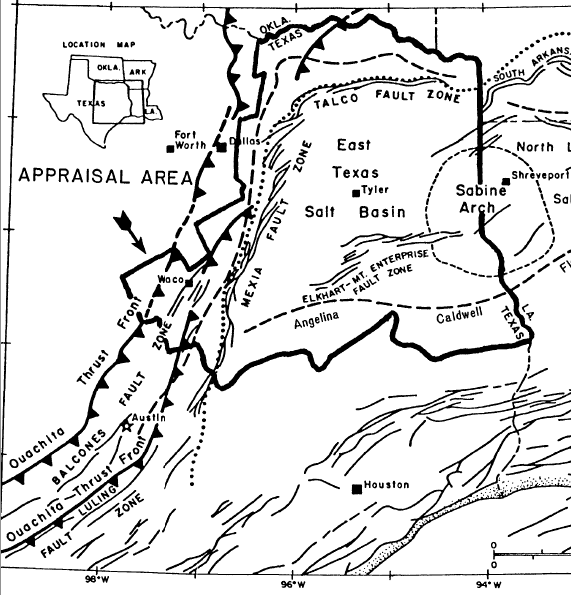
East Texas Basin geological map

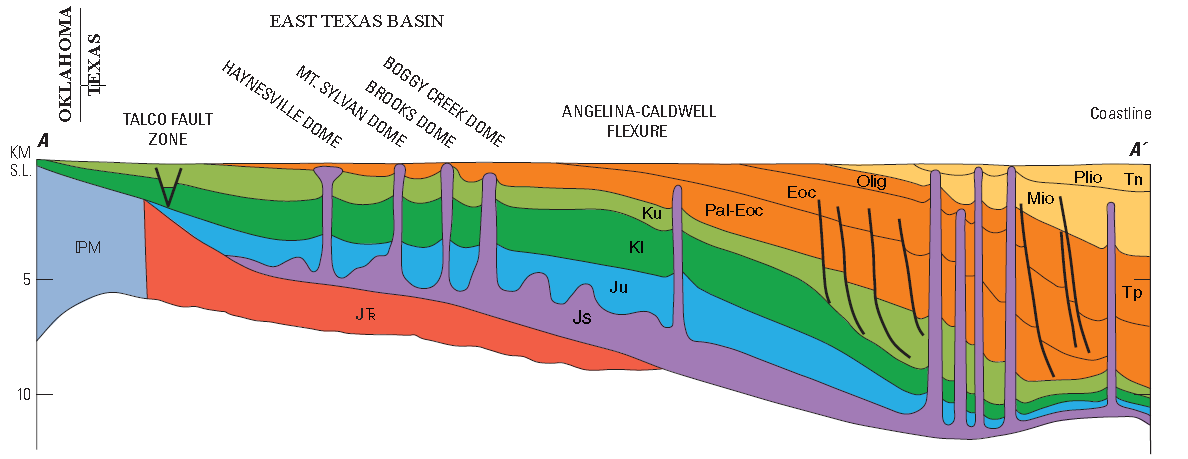
East Texas Basin geologic cross section, where PM is Pennsylvanian-Mississippian, J TR are Lower and Upper Triassic "red beds" and volcanics, Js is Middle Jurassic salt, Ju is Upper Jurassic, Kl is Lower Cretaceous, Ku is Upper Cretaceous, Tp is Paleogene, and Tn is Neogene.

The East Texas Oil Field is a large oil and gas field in east Texas. Covering 140,000 acres (57,000 ha) and parts of five counties, and having 30,340 historic and active oil wells, it is the second-largest oil field in the United States outside Alaska, and first in total volume of oil recovered since its discovery in 1930. Over 5.42 billion barrels (862,000,000 m^{3}) of oil have been produced from it to-date. It is a component of the Mid-continent oil field, the huge region of petroleum deposits extending from Kansas to New Mexico to the Gulf of Mexico.

The field includes parts of Gregg, western Rusk, southern Upshur, southeastern Smith, and northeastern Cherokee counties in the northeastern part of the state. Overall the field is about 45 miles (72 km) long on the north–south axis, and five miles (8 km) to 12 miles (19 km) across. The producing sands were relatively shallow at about 3,500 feet (1,100 m), and the oil contained in them was high gravity, low in sulfur, and yielded a high percentage of gasoline (up to 37 percent). Interstate 20 cuts across the field from east to west, and the towns of Kilgore, Overton, and Gladewater are on the field. At one time, downtown Kilgore had more than 1,000 active wells clustered in a tight area, making it the densest oil development in the world.

== Geology ==
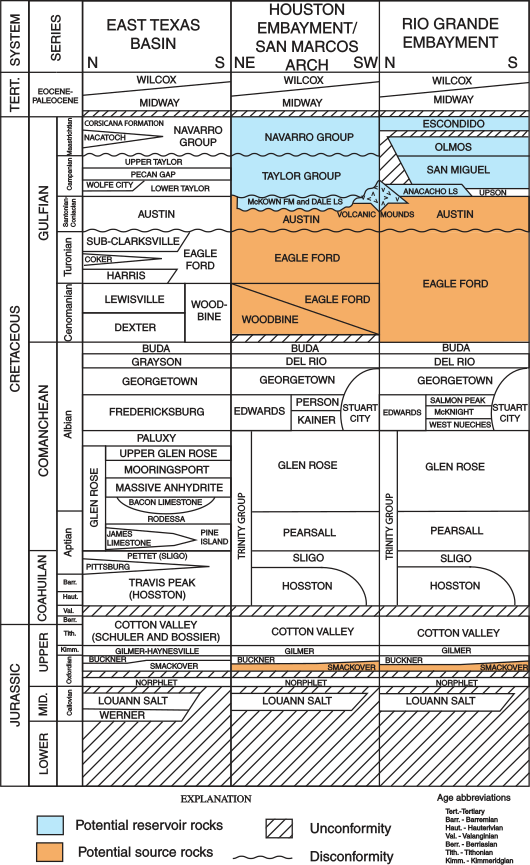
East Texas Basin stratigraphic column

The primary productive geologic unit is the Cretaceous-age Woodbine Formation, a regional petroleum-bearing unit which had been known since the early part of the 20th century. This sandstone unit was deposited during a period when East Texas was a shallow sea, approximately 100 million years ago. During a subsequent period it was uplifted with the Sabine Uplift, eroded, and then covered again by the sea, which this time unconformably deposited a layer of impermeable chalk, the Austin Chalk, creating a stratigraphic trap – a situation where oil, which is lighter than water and migrates upwards, reaches a point where it can move no farther, and pools. The source rock for the oil in East Texas is the overlying Eagle Ford Shale.

Water intrusion from deeper in Woodbine Formation is the mechanism pushing oil through the reservoir toward the producing wells. A 1932 study showed that oil wells stopped flowing when water pressure dropped below 800 pounds per square inch.

More recently, the gas-rich Jurassic Haynesville Shale has become the target of exploration and production.

== History ==
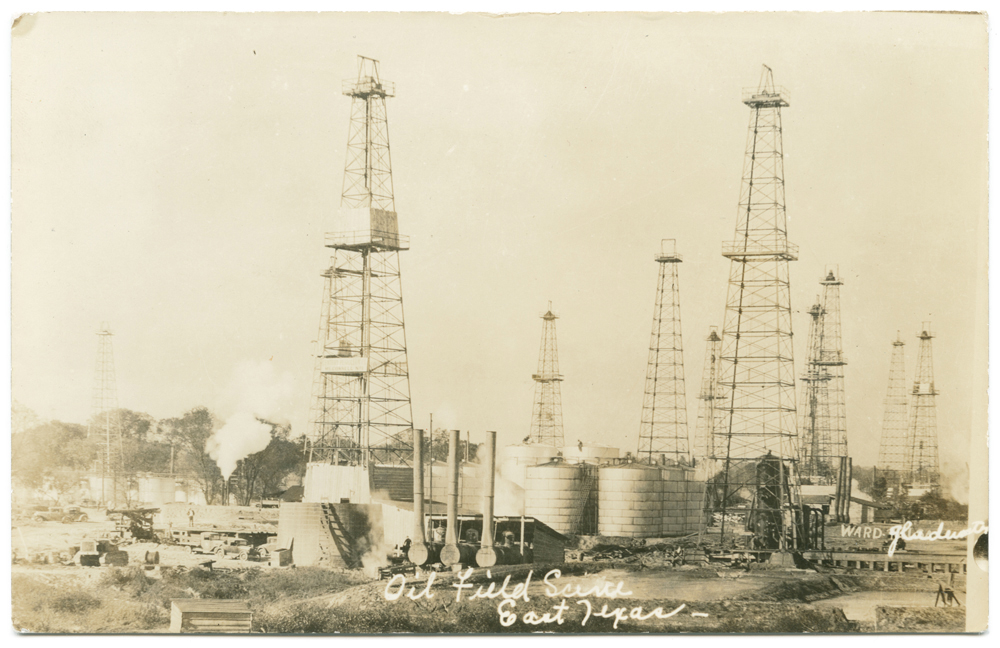
Oil Field Scene, East Texas c. 1930

A depiction of a muddy Main Street at the East Texas Oil Museum, in Kilgore, Texas

Several early attempts were made to produce oil in the area, beginning in 1911, with the failed Millville Oil Company, but drilling technology had not progressed sufficiently to reach oil at the depths it is found there, which are mainly below 3,501 feet (1,067 m); most early wells ended in broken bits, dry holes, and bankrupt operators. Finally, an enterprising Alabama man, Columbus Marion Joiner, was the first with enough persistence to succeed, and on October 3, 1930, his Daisy Bradford No. 3 well (named after the widow who owned the farm) hit oil at 3,536 feet (1,078 m) below ground surface. The well is located near the southeastern boundary of the oil field. This was the third well Joiner drilled, the first was abandoned at 1,098 feet (335 m) in February 1928, the second at 2,518 feet (767 m) in March 1929, but the second did show gas below 1,400 feet (430 m). Joiner employed the driller Ed Laster for the third well, which was spudded in May 1929, only 375 feet (114 m) from the second site. Only about 100 metres (330 ft) separated the second site from the first site. On 20 July 1930, Laster took a core sample at 3,411 feet (1,040 m), which showed 9 inches (23 cm) of oil sand. On 5 September 1930, a drill stem test at 3,486 feet (1,063 m) showed oil and gas. By 2 October, the casing was cemented in, and the well was ready to be brought in, with over 8000 persons on hand to bear witness. On 5 October, oil gushed over the derrick before Laster directed the 6800 BOPD flow into storage tanks.

The Daisy Bradford discovery well settled in to produce, on average, 250 BOPD. On 13 December, the Deep Rock Oil well produced 3000 BOPD a mile west of the Joiner well. On 16 December, H.L. Hunt's well to the south of the Joiner well, produced under 100 BOPD. On 28 December, Ed Bateman's well, No. 1 Lou Della Crim, on a site picked by the geologist P.S. Groginski 13 miles (21 km) to the north of the Daisy Bradford 3, produced 22,000 barrels (3,500 m^{3}) daily. On 26 January 1931, the John E. Farrell, W.A. Moncrief, and Eddie Showers well, the Lathrop 1, produced 20,000 BOPD. The well, about 26 miles (42 km) north of the initial Daisy Bradford well, gushed 320 barrels (51 m^{3}) of oil per hour, from approximately the same depth as the other wells, 3,587 feet (1,093 m). That these wells were in a connected oil reservoir was not immediately obvious to those who drilled them, as no field this large had ever been discovered on the North American continent. Within a few months, drillers, landowners, and investors began to realize they had a spectacular oil field two thirds of a mile under their feet, one that would produce enormous quantities of high-grade oil almost anywhere they drilled.

H.L. Hunt was among the independent oil producers who rushed to East Texas. Hunt had been successful during the 1920s in the El Dorado and Smackover oil fields of Arkansas. When Dad Joiner found himself in legal trouble soon after the Daisy Bradford No. 3 discovery, Hunt met with him at the Baker Hotel in Dallas in November 1930 and bought the well and 5,580 acres for $1.34 million. On 20 December, Hunt's Panola Pipeline Company was pumping oil to a branch line of the Missouri Pacific Railroad, where tank cars sent it onward to Sinclair Oil Corporation's Houston refinery. By the summer of 1931, about 1,200 Rusk County oil wells were producing 900,000 barrels of oil a day. Hunt's purchase provided the financial base for him to found Hunt Oil Company in 1934.

It was the enormous quantities of oil from the East Texas Oil Field and their importance to the Allied effort in World War II that led to the creation of the world's largest pipeline up until that time, the "Big Inch", a 24-inch (610 mm), 1,400-mile (2,300 km) pipeline which transported crude to refineries in the Philadelphia area. Prior to building the pipeline, oil had to be transported by ship, and many such ships were sunk by German submarines during the early part of the war, especially in 1942 and early 1943. Construction of the pipeline commenced in August 1942 and terminated on March 2, 1944. By the end of the war, over 350 million barrels (56,000,000 m^{3}) of crude flowed from East Texas to the northeast states through the Big Inch.

In the middle of the 20th century, the East Texas Oil Field was the center of a slant-hole scandal. Some unscrupulous operators had drilled slanted holes from across their lease lines into the productive portions of the Woodbine formation. Inspectors found 380 deviated wells and shut them down with the assistance of the Texas Rangers. An estimated $100 million worth of oil was stolen over several decades from legal owners.

Today, the area remains a strong contributor to oil production in Texas. The significance of the region to Texas' overall production, however, has been tempered by the increase of drilling activity in the Eagle Ford Shale and the Permian Basin.

Since its discovery, the East Texas Oil Field has produced more than 5.2 billion barrels (830,000,000 m^{3}) of oil, and it originally contained more than 7 billion barrels (1.1×10^{9} m^{3}). At the 2018 price of about $55/bbl, the past production would be worth around $285 billion today.

== See also ==
- List of oil pipelines
- List of oil refineries
- Burford v. Sun Oil Co.
- History of Kilgore, Texas
