= Kilgore, Texas =

City in Texas, United States

- City
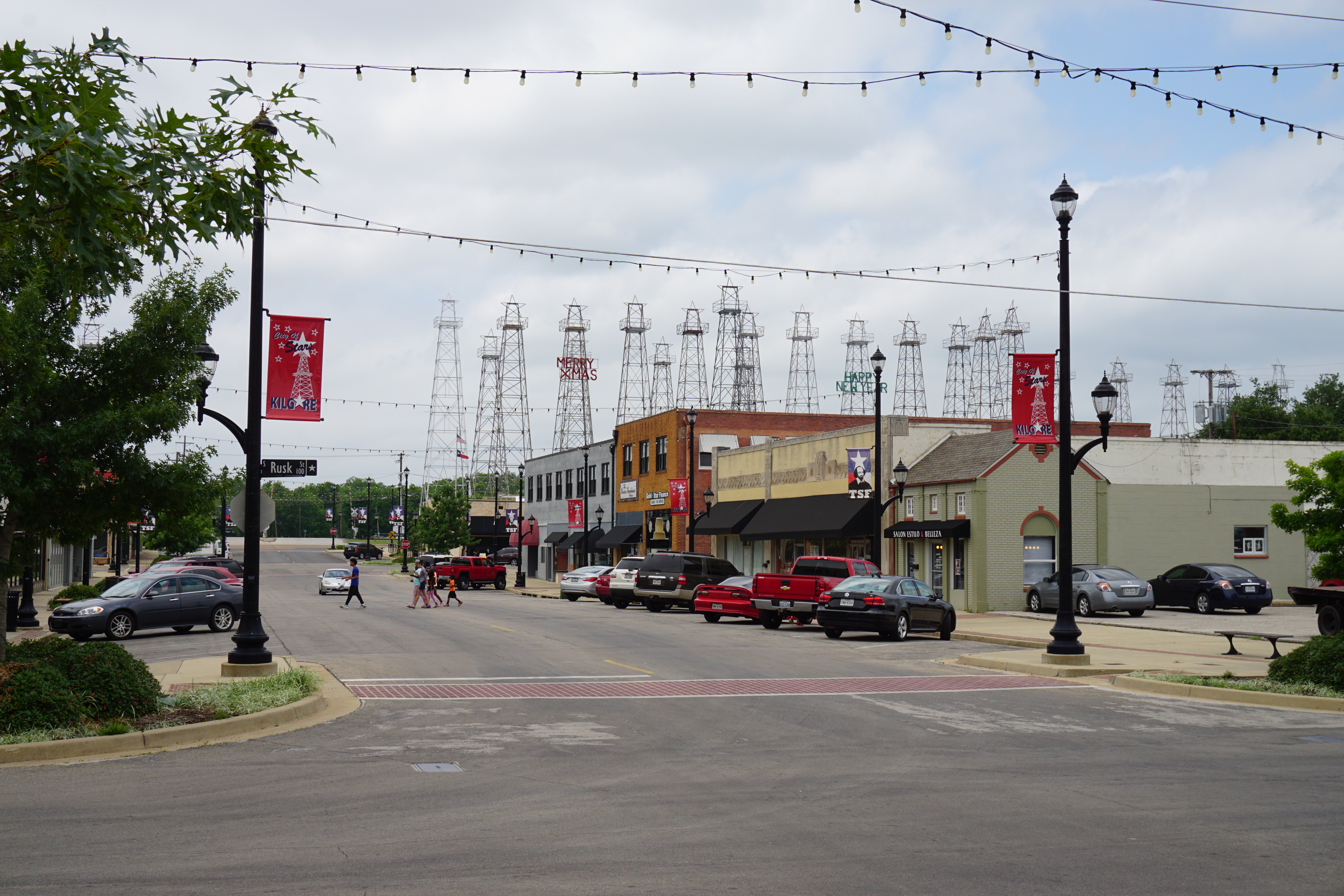
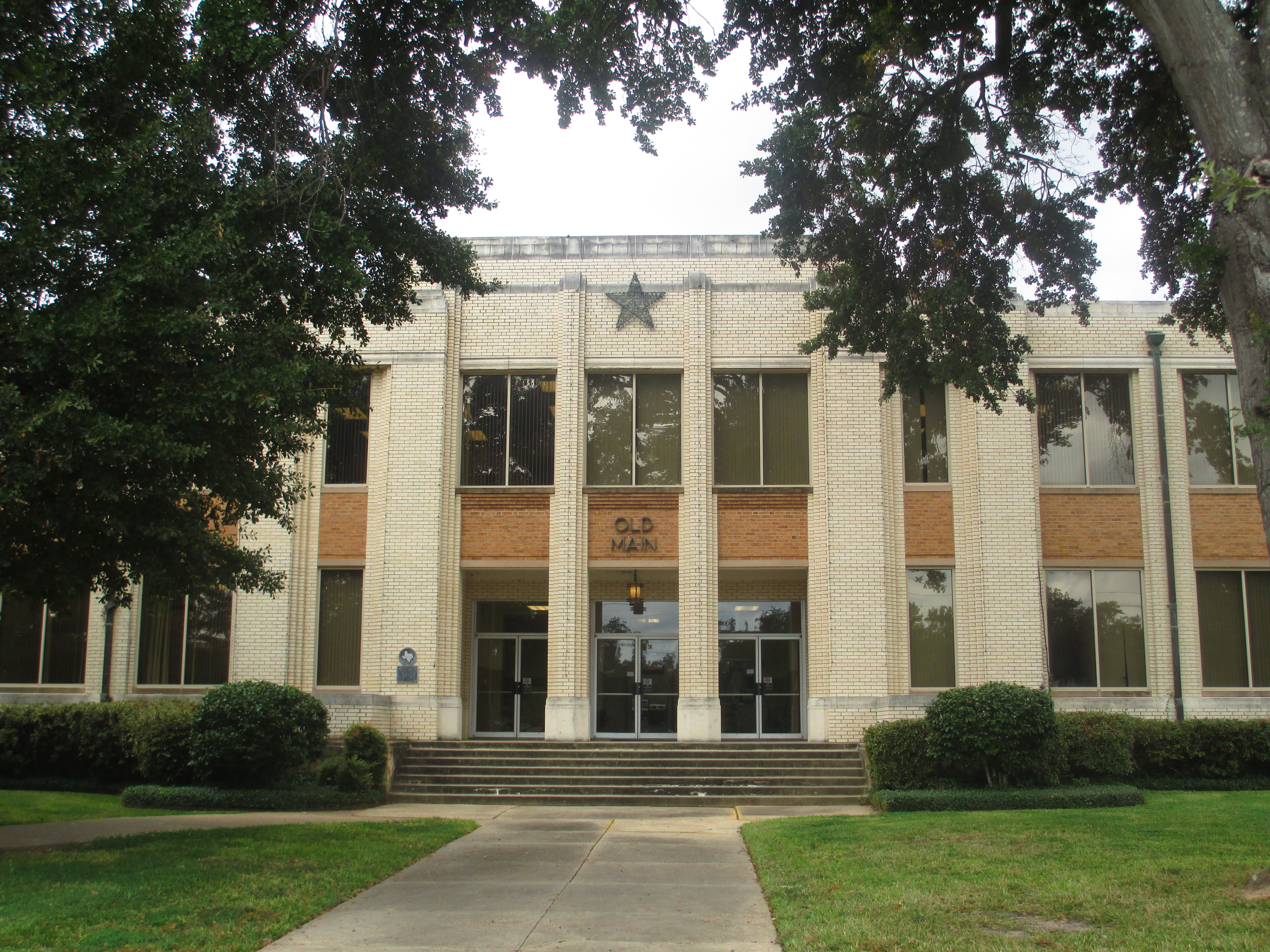
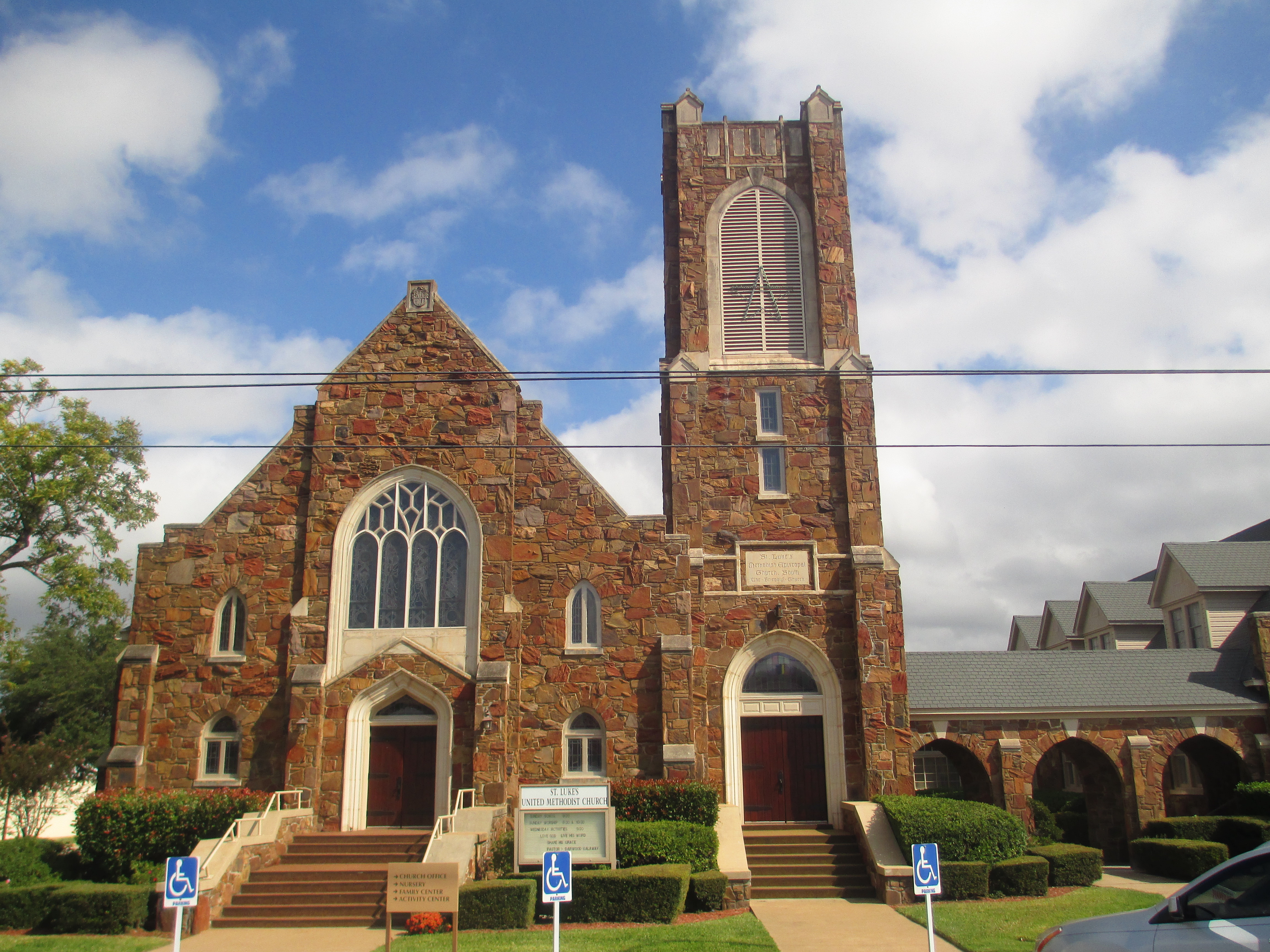
- Main Street In Kilgore Old Main at Kilgore College St. Lukes United Methodist Church in downtown Kilgore

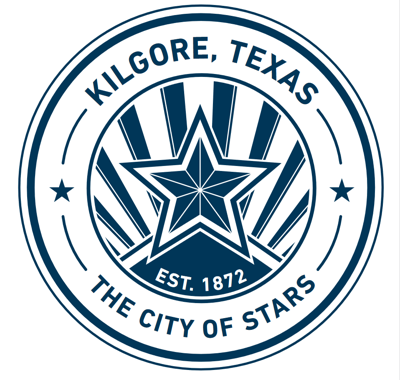
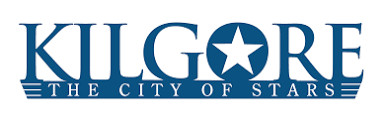
- Seal Wordmark
- Nicknames: "Oil Capital of the World", "Oil City of the World", K-Town, Home of the Rangerettes
- Motto: "The City of Stars"
- Interactive map of Kilgore, Texas
- Location within Texas Location within the United States
- Coordinates: 32°23′08″N 94°52′07″W
- Country: United States
- State: Texas
- Region: East Texas
- Counties: Gregg, Rusk
- Founded: 1872; 154 years ago

Government
  - Type: Council-Manager
  - Mayor: R.E. Spradlin III
  - City Manager: Rachel Rowe

Area
  - Total: 18.64 sq mi (48.29 km^{2})
  - Land: 18.61 sq mi (48.20 km^{2})
  - Water: 0.035 sq mi (0.09 km^{2})
- Elevation: 351 ft (107 m)

Population (2020)
  - Total: 13,376
  - Density: 718.7/sq mi (277.5/km^{2})
- Demonym: Kilgoreites

GDP (of MSA)
  - Metro: $20.259 billion (2022)
- Time zone: UTC−6 (CST)
  - Summer (DST): UTC−5 (CDT)
- ZIP Codes: 75662-3
- Area code: 903, 430
- FIPS code: 48-39124
- GNIS ID: 2411541
- Website: cityofkilgore.com

Kilgore (/ˈkɪlɡɔːr/) is a city in Gregg and Rusk counties in Texas, United States. As of the 2020 census, its population was 13,376. It is located where Interstate 20 and US 259 converge south of the Sabine River.

== History ==
Kilgore was founded in 1872 when the International–Great Northern Railroad completed the initial phase of rail line between Palestine and Longview. The rail company chose to bypass New Danville, a small community about 10 miles (16 km) southeast of Longview, in lieu of a new townsite platted on 174 acres (0.70 km^{2}) sold to the railroad by Constantine Buckley Kilgore, the town's namesake. That way the railroad gained the profits from sale and development of the lands.

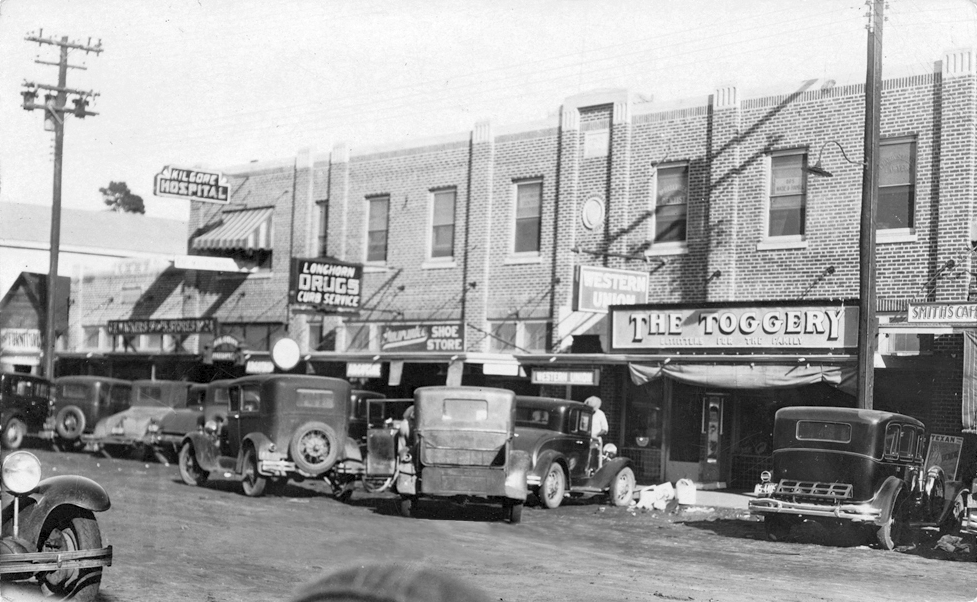
Kilgore's downtown in 1930

Kilgore grew significantly after October 3, 1930, when wildcatter Columbus M. "Dad" Joiner struck oil near the neighboring town of Henderson. The well known as the Daisy Bradford #3, marked the discovery of the vast East Texas Oil Field. Kilgore rapidly transformed from a small farming town on the decline into a bustling boomtown. The Daisy Bradford #3 was subsequently followed by the Lou Della Crim No. 1 and many others. By 1936, the population had increased to more than 12,000, and Kilgore's skyline was crowded with oil derricks.

In the 1940s Kilgore had over 1,000 wooden oil derricks. One acre was known by the nickname "The world's richest acre." Now there are 60 steel replicas of the derricks in the city topped with stars. The city is nicknamed the City of Stars.

== Geography ==
Kilgore is located in southern Gregg County and extends south into Rusk County, where over three-fourths of the city are located in Gregg County, the remainder in Rusk County.

According to the United States Census Bureau, Kilgore has a total area of 15.7 square miles (40.7 km^{2}), of which 15.7 square miles (40.6 km^{2}) are land and 0.04 square miles (0.1 km^{2}), or 0.22%, are covered by water.

Kilgore is located in the Piney Woods region south of the Sabine River.

== Demographics ==
As of the 2020 census, there were 13,376 people, 4,923 households, and 3,476 families residing in the city.

Historical population
Census	Pop.	Note	%±
1880	248		—
1940	6,708		—
1950	9,638		43.7%
1960	10,092		4.7%
1970	9,495		−5.9%
1980	11,331		19.3%
1990	11,066		−2.3%
2000	11,301		2.1%
2010	12,975		14.8%
2020	13,376		3.1%
U.S. Decennial Census

=== 2020 census ===
The median age was 35.4 years. 26.0% of residents were under the age of 18 and 16.3% of residents were 65 years of age or older. For every 100 females there were 92.2 males, and for every 100 females age 18 and over there were 88.4 males age 18 and over.

96.5% of residents lived in urban areas, while 3.5% lived in rural areas.

Of the 4,923 households in Kilgore, 35.6% had children under the age of 18 living in them. Of all households, 44.5% were married-couple households, 18.2% were households with a male householder and no spouse or partner present, and 31.4% were households with a female householder and no spouse or partner present. About 27.6% of all households were made up of individuals and 12.3% had someone living alone who was 65 years of age or older.

There were 5,425 housing units, of which 9.3% were vacant. The homeowner vacancy rate was 1.7% and the rental vacancy rate was 7.8%.

Racial composition as of the 2020 census
Race	Number	Percent
White	8,358	62.5%
Black or African American	1,881	14.1%
American Indian and Alaska Native	98	0.7%
Asian	111	0.8%
Native Hawaiian and Other Pacific Islander	7	0.1%
Some other race	1,409	10.5%
Two or more races	1,512	11.3%
Hispanic or Latino (of any race)	2,998	22.4%

=== 2000 census ===
As of the census of 2000, 11,301 people, 4,403 households, and 2,963 families resided in the city. The population density was 734.3 inhabitants per square mile (283.5/km^{2}). The 4,766 housing units averaged 309.7 units per square mile (119.6 units/km^{2}). The racial makeup of the city was 78.22% White, 12.34% African American, 0.41% Native American, 0.68% Asian, 0.03% Pacific Islander, 6.95% from other races, and 1.38% from two or more races. Hispanics or Latinos of any race were 11.11% of the population.

Of the 4,403 households, 30.2% had children under the age of 18 living with them, 50.5% were married couples living together, 12.6% had a female householder with no husband present, and 32.7% were not families. About 27.6% of all households were made up of individuals, and 13.6% had someone living alone who was 65 years of age or older. The average household size was 2.48 and the average family size was 3.03.

In the city, the population was distributed as 24.6% under the age of 18, 12.5% from 18 to 24, 26.2% from 25 to 44, 20.3% from 45 to 64, and 16.5% who were 65 years of age or older. The median age was 36 years. For every 100 females, there were 94.3 males. For every 100 females age 18 and over, there were 91.1 males.

The median income for a household in the city was $43,129, and for a family was $61,765. Males had a median income of $45,995 versus $30,124 for females. The per capita income for the city was $21,297. About 9.7% of families and 15.1% of the population were below the poverty line, including 19.1% of those under age 18 and 13.9% of those age 65 or over.

== Economy ==
In 2023, Kilgore had 309 locally owned businesses, and attracted $117 million of new industrial investment.

== Arts and culture ==
=== Performing arts ===
Kilgore College Rangerettes. Photo by Carol M. Highsmith.

The Kilgore College Rangerettes, the world's first precision dance drill team, were founded in Kilgore in 1940 by Gussie Nell Davis. The Rangerettes provide college football halftime entertainment, and appear annually in the Macy's Thanksgiving Day Parade.

=== Museums and historical institutions ===
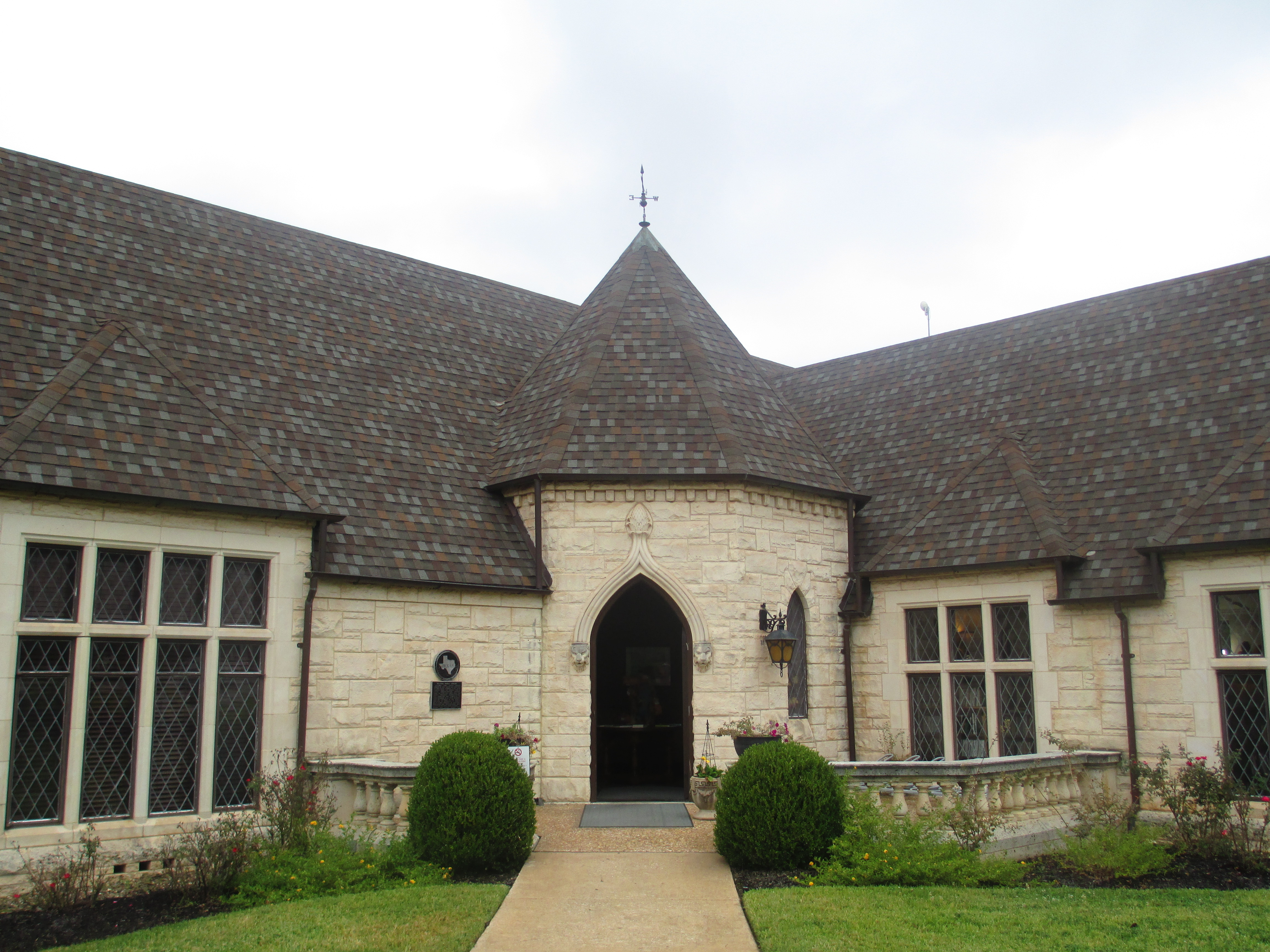
Kilgore Public Library, built during the New Deal era.

- The East Texas Oil Museum features a recreation of the 1930s oil boom.
- The Rangerette Showcase and Museum is dedicated to the Rangerettes, and features memorabilia.
- Kilgore Public Library was completed in 1939, and was a project of the New Deal-era Public Works Administration and Works Progress Administration.

=== Festivals and events ===
Festivals and events include:

- Kilgore Oktoberfest, which blends German and Texan traditions, and features beer gardens, music, and dancing.
- The Reel East Texas Film Festival, which features independent films.
- The Texas Shakespeare Festival, a professional summer repertory theatre company founded in 1986, which performs in the Van Cliburn Auditorium at Kilgore College.
- The East Texas Pipe Organ Festival, which celebrates Kilgore organ builder Roy Perry, and features concerts and tours of organs in the region.

== Sports ==
R.E. St. John Memorial Stadium is a multi-purpose sports stadium primarily serving Kilgore College and the Kilgore Independent School District for football games and other events.

Driller Park was the homefield for the Kilgore Drillers,

=== Baseball teams ===
- Kilgore Drillers (1947 to 1950) in the East Texas League and the Lone Star League. They played home games at Driller Park, a venue originally built for them.
- Kilgore Gushers
- Kilgore Rangers (1937 to 1938)
- Kilgore Braves
- East Texas Pump Jacks (2009 to 2016)

== Park and recreation ==
The Kilgore Trails System is 3.5 miles (5.6 km) and was designed for walkers, runners, and cyclists. The trail system has access points throughout the city, and passes through wooded areas.

== Government ==
=== Local government ===
List of mayors of Kilgore, Texas
- Malcolm Crim, 1931–1933
- Roy H. Laird, 1933–1941
- L.N. Crim, 1957–1959
- Foster Trammell Bean, 1961–1981
- Mickey Smith, 1981–1987
- Joe T. Parker, 2009–2010
- Ronnie Spradlin, 2010–present

According to the city's most recent Comprehensive Annual Financial Report Fund Financial Statements, the city's various funds had $17.4 million in revenues, $19.4 million in expenditures, $19.5 million in total assets, $0.8 million in total liabilities, and $17.5 million in investments.

=== State government ===
Kilgore is represented in the Texas Senate by Republican Bryan Hughes, District 1, and in the Texas House of Representatives by Republican David Simpson, District 7 and Travis Clardy, District 11.

=== Federal government ===
At the federal level, the two U.S. senators from Texas are Republicans John Cornyn and Ted Cruz. Kilgore is part of Texas's 1st congressional district, which is currently represented by Republican Nathaniel Moran.

== Education ==
=== Public schools ===
- Most of the city is within the Kilgore Independent School District, which covers sections of Gregg and Rusk counties.
- Sabine Independent School District also serves northern portions of Kilgore

=== Higher education ===
Kilgore College is home to the Rangers and the Kilgore College Rangerettes.

== Media ==
=== Newspapers ===
The Kilgore News Herald is a twice-weekly newspaper published in the city.

=== Radio ===
- KZLO (contemporary Christian)
- KKTX-FM (classic rock)
- K287AJ (classic hits)

== Infrastructure ==
=== Transportation ===
==== Major highways ====
- Interstate 20
- Highway 259
- State Highway 31
- State Highway 42
- Texas State Highway 135

==== Airports ====
- East Texas Regional Airport is located 8 miles east of Kilgore, and services the city.
- Kilgore Airport

==== Rail ====
- Union Pacific Railroad

==== Public transportation ====
GoBus is a regional transit system serving Kilgore and nearby cities.

==== Cycling ====
Kilgore's cycling infrastructure includes the 3.5-mile Creekside Trail, part of the Kilgore Trails System, and the Big Head Mountain Bike Trail. Opened in phases from 2018 to 2020, the Creekside Trail follows Bighead Creek with multiple access points.

=== Healthcare ===
The Christus Good Shepherd Emergency Room provides 24-hour emergency care.

== Notable people ==
=== Sports ===
- Audrey Chase Hampton, MLB Pitcher for the New York Yankees
- Wayne Daniels (born 1987), NFL Defensive end played for the New York Jets
- Loyie Nawlin "Buddy" Humphrey (1935 – 1988), NFL Quarterback for the Los Angeles Rams, Dallas Cowboys, and St. Louis Cardinals
- James Randel "Randy" Matson (born 1945), Olympian
- Alvin Reed (born 1944), played in the NFL for the Houston Oilers and Washington Redskins
- Walter Edward "Ed" Red (born 1942), Olympian

=== Arts ===
- Ally Venable (born 1999), blues rock guitar player, singer, and songwriter.
- Gussie Nell Davis (1906 - 1993), created the Rangerettes at Kilgore College in 1940.
- Hank O'Neal (born 1940), music producer, author and photographer, veteran.
- Lois Towles (1933 – 1983) was an African-American classical pianist, music educator, and community activist.
- Robert Patrick (1937 – 2023), playwright and actor
- Van Cliburn (1934 – 2013), piano virtuoso, lived and grew up in Kilgore.
- Will Jennings (1944 – 2024), American songwriter, and composer

=== More ===
- Charles Hurwitz (born 1940), businessman and financier
- David Van Os (1950 – 2023), civil rights activist, labor lawyer, politician; attended Kilgore High School
- Malcolm Crim (1886 – 1971), american businessman, politician, and the first mayor of Kilgore.
- Roy H. Laird (1933 – 1950), second mayor of kilgore
- Robert G. "Bob" Goss (1898 – 1978), former police chief of Kilgore, and a Texas Ranger

== In popular culture ==
- Miracle in East Texas based on the Kilgore Oil Boom.

== See also ==
- List of museums in East Texas
- National Register of Historic Places listings in Gregg County, Texas
- National Register of Historic Places listings in Rusk County, Texas
- List of municipalities in Texas
