= List of the tallest statues in the United States =

This list of the tallest statues in the United States ranks free-standing statues based on their height from base to top. The list also includes novelty architecture.

== Statues over 40 ft (12.2 m) ==
Statue	Height		Image	Sculptor	Completed	Location	Coordinates	Materials	Notes
Statue	ft	m	Image	Sculptor	Completed	Location	Coordinates	Materials	Notes
Statue of Liberty (Liberty Enlightening the World)	151	46		Frédéric Bartholdi	1886	Liberty Island, New York City, New York	40.6892°N 74.0445°W	copper sheet on metal armature	The interior framework was designed by Gustave Eiffel. Stands upon a 47 m (154 ft) base Total monument height: 93 m (310 ft)
Pegasus and Dragon	110	33.5		Mark Kara (designer); Stark Engineers; Strassacker Art Foundry	2014	Gulfstream Park Racetrack and Casino, Hallandale Beach, Florida	25.982155°N 80.140495°W	bronze and steel	Pegasus is 33.4 m (110 ft) in height. The dragon is 15.2 m (50 ft) in height
Venus	92	28		Lawrence Argent	2017	Piazza Angelo Courtyard, San Francisco, California	37.7782°N 122.4131°W	Stainless steel	The statue depicts Venus de Milo. The collection of sculptures that Venus sits in is called C'era Una Volta.
Statue of Union	90	27.4			2024	Sri Ashtalakshmi Temple, Sugar Land, Texas	29.6700°N 95.6182°W	Panchaloha (five-metal alloy of gold, silver, copper, zinc, and iron)	The statue depicts Hindu God Hanuman
Our Lady of the Rockies	88.6	27		Robert O'Bill (artist/creator) Laurien Eugene Riehl (designer)	1985	Butte, Montana	46°0′1.7″N 112°26′46.58″W	concrete base; stainless steel statue	Stands upon a 1.5 m (5 ft) base Total monument height: 28.5 m (93.6 ft)
Metaphor: The Tree of Utah	87	27	see article	Karl Momen	1986	Bonneville Salt Flats, Utah		concrete	
Iron Man Statue: The Emergence of Man Through Steel	85	26		Jack E. Anderson	1987	Chisholm, Minnesota	47°28'53'N 92°53'46'W	brass, copper, steel, iron ore	Measures 85 ft tall, 26m from the base to the top of the helmet, the helmet is light with LED
Golden Driller	75	23			1953	Tulsa Expo Center, Tulsa, Oklahoma	36.133638°N 95.931158°W	cast concrete and plaster	
Sugar Land Quan Am	72	21.94		Mai Chi Kim	1998	Chua Viet Nam, Sugar Land, Texas	29.670853°N 95.617491°W	cast concrete	
Brachiosaurus Mother and Baby	70	21.34		Gary Staab	2009	Children's Museum of Indianapolis, Indianapolis, Indiana	39°48′39″N 86°9′27″W	fiberglass	
United States Marine Corps War Memorial; Iwo Jima Memorial	68	20.7		Felix de Weldon	1954	Arlington Ridge Park, Arlington, Virginia	38°53′25.7″N 77°04′10.85″W	bronze	Stands upon a 3 m (10 ft) base. Total monument height: 23.7 m (78 ft) View with Washington, D.C. in the distance.
Giraffe	67.6	20.6		Bob Cassilly	1997	Dallas Zoo, Dallas, Texas	32°44′38″N 96°48′52″W	bronze and plexiglass	
A Tribute to Courage; Sam Houston statue	67	20.5	see article	David Adickes	1994	Huntsville, Texas	30°39′40″N 95°30′39″W	cast concrete	Stands upon a 3 m (10 ft) pedestal
Christ of the Ozarks	65.5	20		Emmet Sullivan	1966	Magnetic Mountain, Eureka Springs, Arkansas	36°24′24.87″N 93°43′23.41″W	cast concrete	
Lucy the Elephant	65	19.7		James V. Lafferty, designer	1881	Margate City, New Jersey	39°19′14.33″N 74°30′42.85″W	wood, tin sheeting	Similar novelty buildings built at Coney Island, New York (Elephantine Colossus) and Cape May, New Jersey do not survive. NRHP listed.
Brontosaurus "Dinny the Dinosaur"	65	19.7		Claude K. Bell	1978	Dinosaur Delights, Cabazon, California	33°55′12.5″N 116°46′22.25″W	concrete over a steel frame	The novelty building is 45.7 m (150 ft) in length. The roadside attraction also features a 13.7 m (45 ft) Tyrannosaurus Rex statue.
Skowhegan Indian	62	18.9		Bernard Langlais	1969	Skowhegan, Maine	44.767792°N 69.719803°W	wood, concrete base	Created for the 150th anniversary of Maine statehood Stands upon a 6.1 m (20 ft) base Total monument height: 25 m (82 ft)
The Father of Texas; Stephen Austin statue	60	18.3		David Adickes	2009	Angleton, Texas	29.150535°N 95.449331°W	cast concrete	Stands upon a 3 m (10 ft) pedestal
Healing Hands (The Praying Hands)	60	18		Leonard McMurry	1980	Oral Roberts University, Tulsa, Oklahoma	36.052027°N 95.956617°W	bronze	
Liberty	58	17.7		Michael Benisty	2025	Aurora, Colorado	39°45′21.6″N 104°41′12.0″W	polished stainless steel	Originally unveiled at the Burning Man festival in 2024
Vulcan	56	17.1		Giuseppe Moretti	1904	Red Mountain, Birmingham, Alabama	33°29′30.18″N 86°47′43.86″W	cast iron	Largest cast iron statue in the world. Created for the 1904 St. Louis World's Fair. Stands upon a 38.4 m (126 ft) tower. Total monument height: 55.5 m (182 ft)
Hiawatha	52	15.8		Gordon Displays	1964	Hiawatha Park, Ironwood, Michigan	46.449709°N 90.162152°W	fiberglass	Stands upon a 0.8 m (2.5 ft) base Total monument height: 16.6 m (54.5 ft)
Lux Mundi; Light of the World	52	15.8		Tom Tsuchiya	2012	Solid Rock Church, Monroe, Ohio	39°27′13.78″N 84°19′35.37″W	polymer, composite, steel	Replaced the statue King of Kings which was struck by lightning and destroyed in 2010.
Dignity	50	15.24			2016	overlooking the Missouri River, near Chamberlain, South Dakota	43°47′12.75″N 99°20′17.83″W		
Jolly Green Giant	50	15.2		Creative Displays; F.A.S.T. Corp.	1979	Blue Earth, Minnesota	43°39′02″N 94°5′46″W	fiberglass	Stands upon a 1.7 m (5.5 ft) base Total monument height: 16.9 m (55.5 ft)
Paul Bunyan and Babe the Blue Ox	49.2	15		Ward Berg	Bunyan 1961; Babe 1950	Trees of Mystery, Klamath, California	41°35′4.1″N 124°5′8.83″W	wood, chicken wire, stucco	Replaced a 1946 Bunyan statue by Ray & William Thompson. Based on a model by Ann Cooper.
Tapomurti Shri Nilkanth Varni Murti (A Journey Inspiring Simplicity)	49	14.94		BAPS	2021	Swaminarayan Akshardham, Robbinsville, New Jersey	40.25453351179542°N 74.57632951685069°W	Bronze	The bronze murti is 49 feet tall to commemorate the 49 years Bhagwan Swaminarayan lived on earth while affecting social and spiritual reform in India. The framework was designed by Saints and Volunteers of BAPS.
Black Hawk Statue; The Eternal Indian	48	14.6		Lorado Taft	1911	Lowden State Park, near Oregon, Illinois	42°2′03″N 89°19′59″W	concrete	
Hammering Man	48	14.6		Lippincott, Inc.	1991	Seattle Art Museum, Seattle, Washington	47°36′25.31″N 122°20′17.20″W	steel	
Tex Randall	47	14		Harry Wheeler	1959	Canyon, Texas	34°59′5.29″N 101°55′46.99″W	cement and steel	
Atlas	45	13.7		Lee Lawrie	1937	Rockefeller Center, New York City, New York	40°45′32.12″N 73°58′37.84″W	bronze, granite base	Stands upon a 2.7 m (9 ft) base. Total monument height: 16.4 m (54 ft)
The Keeper of the Plains	44	13.4		Blackbear Bosin	1974	Mid-America All-Indian Center, Wichita, Kansas	37°41′29″N 97°20′59″W	Cor-Ten steel	Stands upon a 9.1 m (30 ft) rock promontory
Washington Monument	44	13.4		Rudolf Siemering	1897	Eakins Oval, Philadelphia, Pennsylvania	39°57′51.3″N 75°10′45″W	bronze and granite	
Rocket Thrower	42.5	12.95		Donald De Lue	1964	Flushing Meadows–Corona Park, New York City, New York	40.7474°N 73.8421°W	bronze	Created for the 1964 New York World's Fair
Athena Parthenos; Athena of the Parthenon	42	12.8		Alan LeQuire	1990	Parthenon, Nashville, Tennessee	36°08′59″N 86°48′49″W	composite of gypsum cement and fiberglass	Tallest indoor statue in United States.
Muskellunge	41	12.5			1976	National Fresh Water Fishing Hall of Fame, Hayward, Wisconsin	46.0078°N 91.4797°W	fiberglass	The world's largest fiberglass sculpture.

== Statues between 20 ft and 40 ft (6.1 and 12.2 m) ==
Statue	Height		Image	Sculptor	Completed	Location	Coordinates	Materials	Notes
Statue	ft	m	Image	Sculptor	Completed	Location	Coordinates	Materials	Notes
The Big Indian (Chief Passamaquoddy)	40	12.2		Rodman Shutt	1969	313 U.S. Route 1, Freeport, Maine	43.817851°N 70.144675°W	fiberglass	Stands upon a 2.7 m (9 ft) base Total monument height: 14.9 m (49 ft); Nickname: "BFI" (Big Freeport Indian)
Victory	38	11.58		George Brewster	1893	Soldiers' and Sailors' Monument, Indianapolis, Indiana	39°46′6″N 86°9′29″W	bronze	Victory stands atop a 75 m (246 ft) tower. Total monument height: 86.56 m (284 ft); Restored in 2011
Vision of Peace; Indian God of Peace	38	11.58		Carl Milles	1936	City Hall, St. Paul, Minnesota	44°56′39″N 93°5′38″W	Mexican onyx	
William Penn	37	11.3		Alexander Milne Calder	1894	City Hall, Philadelphia, Pennsylvania	39.95281°N 75.16352°W	bronze	Stands atop a 155.75 m (511 ft) tower designed by John McArthur Jr.
Apatosaurus "Wall Drug Dinosaur"	37	11.3		Emmet Sullivan	1968	Wall Drug Store, Wall, South Dakota	43.993231°N 102.241795°W	concrete over an iron frame	The dinosaur statue is 24.4 m (80 ft) in length.
Portlandia	36.9	11.25	see article	Raymond Kaskey	1985	The Portland Building, Portland, Oregon	45°30′56.7″N 122°40′44.5″W	hammered copper	Stands atop the entrance pavilion to The Portland Building.
National Monument to the Forefathers; Central figure: Faith	36	11		Faith: William Rimmer & [John D.?] Perry	1907	Pilgrim Memorial State Park, Plymouth, Massachusetts	41°57′36″N 70°40′34″W	solid granite	Faith stands upon a 13.7 m (45 ft) pedestal. Total monument height: 24.7 m (81 ft); Other figures: Alexander Doyle, Carl Conrads & James H. Mahoney. Architect: Joseph Edward Billings
Iron Man	36	11	see article	Jack E. Anderson	1987	Minnesota Discovery Center, Chisholm, Minnesota	47.28876°N 92.53762°W	iron ore	Stands upon a 14 m (45 ft) pedestal. Total monument height: 25 m (81 ft)
Madonna, Queen of the Universe	35	10.7		Arrigo Minerbi	1954	Don Orione Home, East Boston, Massachusetts	42.389801°N 71.005604°W	bronze and copper	Mounted on a gray granite block structure with a crown-shaped gold top.
Paul Bunyan	33	10.1		Dean Krotzer	1985	Paul Bunyan Historical Museum, Akeley, Minnesota	47.003348°N 94.730593°W	fiberglass	Visitors can sit in Bunyan's right hand.
David (inspired by Michelangelo)	32.8	10		Serkan Özkaya	2011	21c Museum Hotel, 700 W. Main Street, Louisville, Kentucky		fiberglass	Stands upon a 5 m (16.4 ft) pedestal Total monument height: 15 m (49.2 ft)
Blue Mustang	32	9.8	see article	Luis Jiménez	2008	Denver International Airport, Denver, Colorado	39.83414°N 104.67638°W	fiberglass	Killed its creator when its head fell on him and severed an artery in his leg. Locals have nicknamed the statue Blucifer.
Ceres	31	9.4		John Storrs	1930	Chicago Board of Trade Building, Chicago, Illinois	41°52′41.25″N 87°37′56.1″W	aluminum	Stands atop a 184 m (605 ft) office building.
Paul Bunyan	31	9.4		J. Norman Martin	1959	Bass Park, Bangor, Maine	44.788657°N 68.778337°W	fiberglass over a steel frame	Stands upon a 2.1 m (6.7 ft) base Total monument height: 11.5 m (37.7 ft)
Paul Bunyan	31	9.4		Victor R. Nelson	1959	Portland, Oregon	45.583829°N 122.686616°W	concrete over a steel frame	Created for the 1959 Oregon Centennial Exposition; NRHP listed.
Statue of Abraham Lincoln (Lincoln Memorial)	30	9.1		Daniel Chester French	1920	Lincoln Memorial, Washington, D.C.	38°53′21.4″N 77°3′0.5″W	marble	
Bellerophon Taming Pegasus	30	9.1		Jacques Lipchitz	1977	Jerome Greene Hall, Columbia University, New York City, New York	40°48′25.34″N 73°57′38.09″W	bronze	
Lady Kindness	29.3	8.93		Dale Johnson, Laura Bush	2024	Lady Kindness, Cadobaz Estate; Warren, Ohio	41°17′26.33″N 80°43′15.79″W	marble	
Martin Luther King Jr.	28	8.53		Lei Yixin	2011	Martin Luther King Jr. Memorial, West Potomac Park, Washington, D.C.	38°53′10″N 77°2′39″W	granite	Carved into a 9.1 m (30 ft) block of granite.
The Equestrian; Don Juan de Oñate	28	8.53		John Sherrill Houser & Ethan Taliesin Houser	2007	El Paso International Airport, El Paso, Texas	31°47′46.021″N 106°23′44.84″W	bronze	The Equestrian stands upon a 2.4 m (8 ft) base. Total monument height: 11 m (36 ft)
Hermann Heights Monument	27	8.2		Alfonz Pelzer	1897	New Ulm, Minnesota		sheet copper over iron	Stands on a 21 m (70 ft) iron column encircled by a spiral staircase to the dome, which is supported by 10 iron columns and a Kasota stone base.
Forever Marilyn (Marilyn Monroe in The Seven Year Itch)	26	7.9	see article	Seward Johnson	2011	The Sculpture Foundation, Hamilton, New Jersey		stainless steel, aluminum	Exhibited in Chicago, Illinois (2011–12) and Palm Springs, California (2012–14)
World's Largest Buffalo Monument	26	7.9	see article	Elmer Petersen	1969	Jamestown, North Dakota		cement	
Dancing Hog	25	7.6		Eugene Sargent	2018	Hogeye Inc., Fayetteville, Arkansas			Installed at the border of Fayetteville and Farmington.
Hanuman Statue	25	7.6			2020	Hindu Temple of Delaware, Hockessin, Delaware		granite	The statue weighs 60,000 pounds and is nation's second tallest statue of Hanuman, the Hindu god of strength and knowledge.
Civic Fame	25	7.6		Adolph Alexander Weinman	1914	Manhattan Municipal Building, New York City, New York	40°42′46.67″N 74°0′14″W	gilded copper	Stands atop a 180 m (580 ft) office building. There is disagreement as to whether the model for the statue was Audrey Munson or Julia “Dudie” Baird.
Miss Pocahontas	25	7.6		W. C. Ballard	1956	Pocahontas, Iowa	42.732739°N 94.658478°W	steel, wood & fiberglass	
Johnny Kaw	25	7.6		William Stewart	1966	Manhattan, Kansas	39°18′02″N 96°57′36″W	concrete over a steel frame	Stands upon a 0.25 m (0.75 ft) base Total monument height: 7.85 m (25.75 ft)
Unconditional Surrender	25	7.6	see article	Seward Johnson	2007	San Diego, California		foam core with a urethane outer layer	
Behind the Walls	24.5	7.5		Jaume Plensa	2018	Ann Arbor, Michigan	42.275167°N 83.740472°W	polyester resin and marble dust	
Orpheus; Francis Scott Key Monument	24	7.3		Charles Henry Niehaus	1922	Fort McHenry; Baltimore, Maryland	39°15′50.91″N 76°34′54.75″W	bronze	Commissioned in 1914 to commemorate the centennial of Key's writing of The Star-Spangled Banner. Stands upon a 4.6 m (15 ft) pedestal Total monument height: 11.9 m (39 ft)
Fountain of Time	24	7.3		Lorado Taft	1922	Washington Park, Chicago, Illinois	41°47′12.3″N 87°36′27.9″W	hollow-cast concrete over a steel frame	Total monument length: 38.7 m (127 ft); Father Time watching the parade of humanity
Ad Astra (To the Stars)	22.2	6.76		Richard Bergen	2002	Kansas State Capitol, Topeka, Kansas	39°02′53″N 95°40′41″W	bronze	A Kansa warrior aiming an arrow at the North Star; Stands atop the Capitol dome
The American Volunteer "Old Simon"	21.5	6.55		Carl Conrads; George Keller (architect)	1876 installed 1880	Antietam National Cemetery, Sharpsburg, Maryland	39°27′33″N 77°44′28″W	solid granite	Stands upon a 7 m (23 ft) pedestal. Total monument height: 13.55 m (44.5 ft); Exhibited at the 1876 Centennial Exposition. Tallest statue in the United States prior to 1886 completion of the Statue of Liberty.
Goddess of Victory and Peace	21	6.4		Samuel Murray	1910	Pennsylvania State Memorial; Gettysburg Battlefield, Gettysburg, Pennsylvania	39.807588°N 77.235153°W	bronze	Stands atop a 27.1 m (89 ft) pavilion. Total monument height: 33.5 m (110 ft); The goddess figure was cast from melted-down cannons.
Apotheosis of St. Louis	20	6.1		Charles Henry Niehaus	1903-06	St. Louis Art Museum, St. Louis, Missouri	38.63980°N 90.29409°W	bronze	Niehaus modeled the statue in plaster for the 1904 St. Louis; World's Fair. It was later cast in bronze by W. R. Hodges. Stands upon a 5.9 m (19.5 ft) pedestal. Total monument height: 12 m (39.5 ft)
Columbia Triumphant; USS Maine Quadriga	20	6.1		Attilio Piccirilli	1913	USS Maine National Monument, Central Park, New York City, New York	40.768242°N 73.981012°W	gilded bronze	Stands upon a 13.1 m (43 ft) pylon Total monument height: 19.2 m (63 ft)

== Statues under 20 ft (6.1 m) ==
Statue	Height		Image	Sculptor	Completed	Location	Coordinates	Materials	Notes
Statue	ft	m	Image	Sculptor	Completed	Location	Coordinates	Materials	Notes
Statue of Freedom	19.5	5.9		Thomas Crawford	1862	United States Capitol, Washington, D.C.	38°53′24″N 77°0′32.4″W	bronze	Stands atop the lantern of the U.S. Capitol's dome.
The Virgin Mary	19	5.8		Giovanni Meli	1865/1882	University of Notre Dame, South Bend, Indiana	41°42' 8.2764″N 86°14′17.4516″W	gilded	Stands atop The Golden Dome on the University of Notre Dame's campus.
Thomas Jefferson	19	5.8		Rudulph Evans	1943	Jefferson Memorial, Washington, D.C.	38°52′53″N 77°2′13″W	bronze	Stands upon a 1.8 m (6 ft) pedestal Total monument height: 7.6 m (25 ft)
Jesus as Teacher	18.5	5.6		Ben Fortunado Marcune	2016	Center Valley, Pennsylvania	40°32'23.8"N 75°22'28.4"W	bronze	Stands upon a 1.3 m (4 ft) pedestal Total monument height 6.9 m (22.5 ft)
Angel Moroni	18	5.5		Avard Fairbanks	1974	Kensington, Maryland	39.0138526°N 77.0663723°W	gilded	Stands atop the Washington D.C. Temple of the LDS Church.
Colorado; Thatcher Memorial Fountain	18	5.5		Lorado Taft	1918	City Park, Denver, Colorado	39.74480°N 104.95685°W	bronze	Stands upon a 2.75 m (9 ft) pedestal.
The Boilermaker	18	5.5		Jon Hair	2005	West Lafayette, Indiana	40°26′05″N 86°55′02″W		Stands adjacent to Ross-Ade Stadium at Purdue University.
Moses	18	5.5		Joseph Turkalj	1963	Notre Dame, Indiana	41°42′09″N 86°14′04″W		Known as 'First Down Moses' of 'Number #1 Moses'.
Paul Bunyan and Babe the Blue Ox	18	5.5		Cyril M. Dickenson (Bunyan); Jim Payton (Babe)	Bunyan 1937; Babe 1939	Bemidji, Minnesota		concrete and plaster	Bunyan stands upon a 0.4 m (1.5 ft) base. Total monument height: 5.9 m (19.5 ft)
Our Lady of the Island	18	5.5		Raphel Desoto	1975	Manorville, New York	40°50′56″N 72°45′32″W	Concrete	Stands within Our Lady of the Island Shrine, upon an 18' tall Glacial Erratic.
Illustrious Brother George Washington	17.25	5.26		Bryant Baker	1949	George Washington Masonic National Memorial, Alexandria, Virginia	38.80748°N 77.06598°W	bronze	Stands upon a 1.57 m (5.16 ft) pedestal. Total monument height: 6.83 m (22.41 ft); Dedicated by President Harry S. Truman, February 22, 1950
Equestrian Statue of General Ulysses S. Grant	17.2	5.23		Henry Shrady	1924	Ulysses S. Grant Memorial, west of United States Capitol, Washington, D.C.	38°53′23.1″N 77°0′46.4″W	bronze	Stands upon a 6.86 (22.5 ft) pedestal Total monument height: 12.1 m (39.7 ft)
Theodore Roosevelt	17	5.2		Paul Manship	1967	Theodore Roosevelt Island National Memorial, Potomac River, Washington, D.C.	38°53′50.74″N 77°3′50.19″W	bronze	Stands upon a 1.7 m (5.6 ft) pedestal. Total monument height: 9.1 m (30 ft)
Pioneer Woman	17	5.2		Bryant Baker	1930	Ponca City, Oklahoma		bronze on granite bass	The sculptor was chosen by the museum-going public following a touring exhibition of the 12 proposed models.
Air Force Honor Guard	17	5.2		Zenos Frudakis	2006	United States Air Force Memorial, Arlington, Virginia	38.868649°N 77.066259°W	bronze	The three stainless steel spires represent the contrails of the Air Force Thunderbirds. The tallest of these is 82.3 m (270 ft).
Lenin	16	5	see article	Emil Venkov	1988 installed 1994	Fremont, Seattle, Washington	47.6514°N 122.3510°W	bronze	
Saraswati	16	4.9	see article	multiple Balinese sculptors	2013	Washington, D.C.	38.9103°N 77.045829°W	unknown	
Superman	16	4.87		Unknown	1993	Metropolis, Illinois	37.1460999°N 88.7355066°W	bronze	
Wisconsin	15.5	4.72		Daniel Chester French	1913-1914	Wisconsin State Capitol, Madison, Wisconsin	43°4′28″N 89°23′5″W	gold-gilded bronze	
Equestrian Statue of General William Tecumseh Sherman; Sherman Memorial	15.5	4.72		Augustus Saint Gaudens	1903	Grand Army Plaza, Central Park, New York City, New York	40.7645°N 73.9732°W	gilded bronze	Stands upon a 2.7 m (8.8 ft) base Total monument height: 7.42 (24.3 ft)
The Sun Singer	15.16	4.62		Carl Milles	1929	Allerton Park, Monticello, Illinois	39°59'39.1"N 88°40'04.4'W	Bronze	The god Apollo with right foot on small tortoise. Milles sent Allerton the only full size replica of the 1926 Swedish commission in 1929. Allerton thought he was getting a garden sculpture. Many copies of the headless, armless castings of Sun Singer by Milles exist in museums worldwide
Diana of the Tower	14.6	4.45		Augustus Saint Gaudens	1893	Philadelphia Museum of Art, Philadelphia, Pennsylvania	39.966°N 75.181°W	gilded copper	Created as a replacement weather vane for the 92.66 m (304 ft) tower of Madison Square Garden, New York City. Removed when the building was demolished, 1925.
Commonwealth	14.5	4.4		Roland Hinton Perry	1905	Pennsylvania State Capitol, Harrisburg, Pennsylvania	40.26435°N 76.88356°W	gilded bronze	Stands atop the lantern of the Pennsylvania State Capitol dome
Myles Standish Monument	14	4.3		S.J. Kelly (designer); Stephano Brignoli and Luigi Limonetta (sculptors)	1898	Myles Standish Monument State Reservation, Duxbury, Massachusetts	42.013486°N 70.6872397°W	granite	Stands upon a 31 m (102 ft) column designed by Alden Frink. Total monument height: 35.35 m (116 ft); Drone flight around Myles Standish Monument.
George Washington	14	4.3		Lorado Taft	1909	University of Washington, Seattle, Washington	47.6560736°N 122.3111274°W	bronze	Created for the 1909 Alaska-Yukon-Pacific Exposition; Stands upon an 8.5 m (28 ft) pedestal. Total monument height: 12.8 m (42 ft)
Gloria Victis	14	4.3		Frederick Ruckstull	1909	Salisbury, North Carolina	35°40′06″N 80°28′16″W	bronze	Stands upon a 2.7 m (9 ft) pedestal. Total monument height: 7 m (23 ft)
Benjamin Franklin	12.5	3.8		James Earle Fraser	1938	Benjamin Franklin National Memorial, Franklin Institute, Philadelphia, Pennsylvania	39°57′29″N 75°10′25″W	marble	Stands upon a 2.5 m (8.4 ft) pedestal. Total monument height: 7.3 m (20.9 ft); The institute's rotunda is a memorial to Franklin.

== Other organizational lists ==
- List of tallest statues
- List of statues
- List of Roman domes
- New Seven Wonders of the World
- List of archaeological sites sorted by country
- List of colossal sculpture in situ
- List of megalithic sites
- List of archaeoastronomical sites sorted by country
- List of Egyptian pyramids
- List of Mesoamerican pyramids
