= Oil Capital of the World =

Nickname historically applied to major US oil-industry cities

The title of "Oil Capital of the World" is often used to refer to Tulsa, Oklahoma, or Kilgore, Texas which is also historically recognized as the "Oil Capital of the World" for its central role in the East Texas Oil Field, the largest oil field in the contiguous United States during the 1930s boom. Houston, Texas, the current center of the oil industry, more frequently uses the sobriquet “The Energy Capital of the World.”

== History ==
=== Early claimants ===
In mid-19th century, when Pennsylvania was the first center of petroleum production, Pittsburgh and Titusville were considered oil capitals. In the later 19th century, before oil was discovered in Texas, Oklahoma, or the Middle East, Cleveland, Ohio had a claim to the title, with 86 or 88 refineries operating in the city in 1884.

=== Tulsa's claim ===
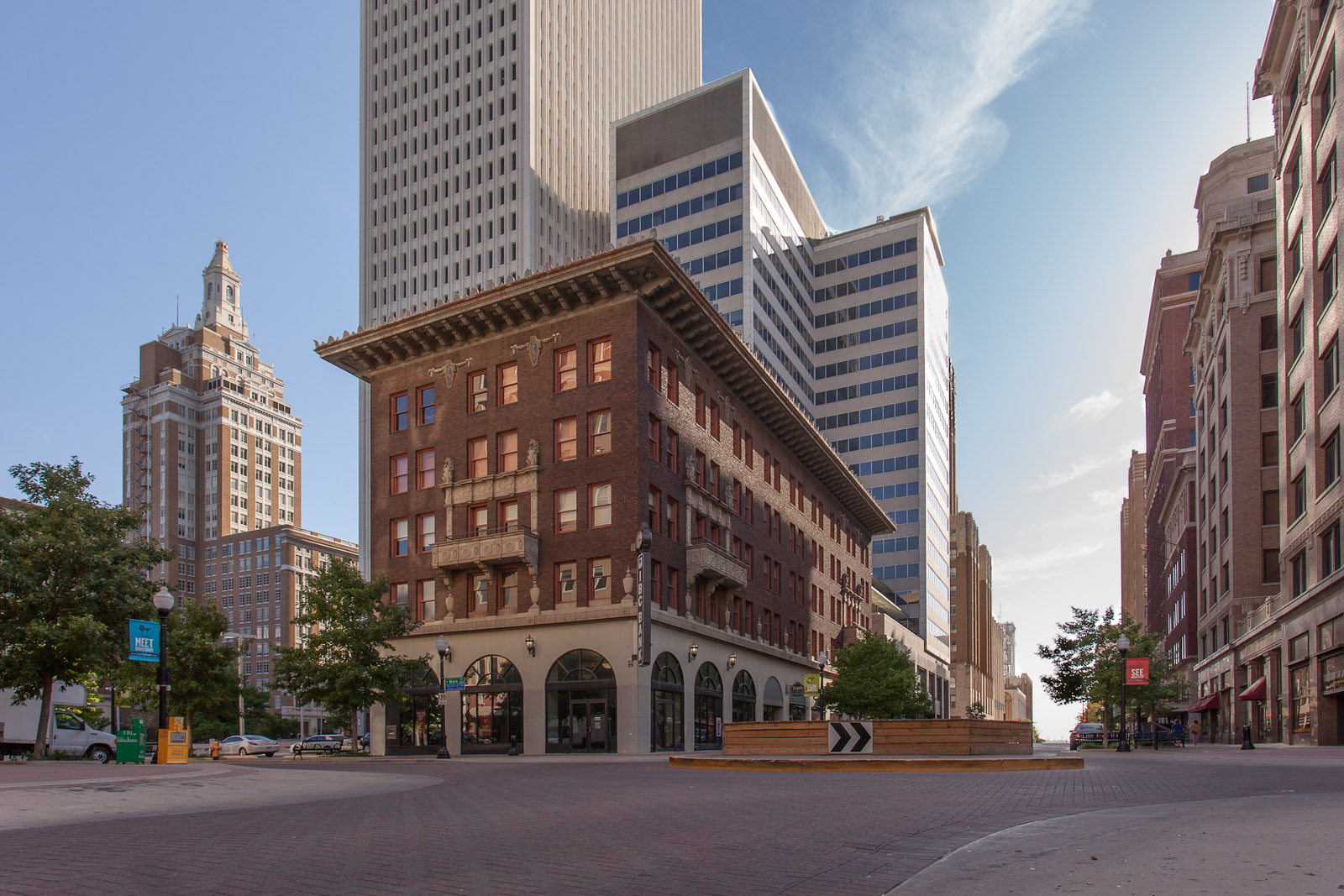
Oil Capital Historic District in Tulsa

Tulsa claimed the name early in the 20th century, after oil strikes at Red Fork (1901) and Glenpool (1905) in Tulsa County. Many prominent oilmen lived in Tulsa at some point, including Josh Cosden, William Skelly, Harry Ford Sinclair, Waite Phillips, Thomas Gilcrease, George Kaiser, and J. Paul Getty. Many corporations producing, refining or transporting petroleum had at some point their headquarters or major facilities in Tulsa including Texaco, BP-Amoco, Cities Service Company, Sinclair Oil and Gas Company, Skelly Oil Company, Warren Petroleum Company, the Williams Companies, Kaiser-Francis Oil Company, and HF Sinclair. In 1923 a group of Tulsa oilmen organized the first International Petroleum Exposition and Congress (IPE); among the IPE's stated purposes was to "firmly establish Tulsa for all time to come as the oil center of the entire world."

Tulsa continued to be known and promote itself as the "oil capital of the world" into the 1950s and 1960s. The IPE grew and reached its peak attendance in 1966, when the Golden Driller, a 24-ton, 76-foot-tall statue “(d)edicated to the men of the petroleum industry…” was built in front of what was then the new IPE Building, said to be the world's largest building under one roof. The Golden Driller remains a Tulsa tourist attraction today. By the 1970s, however, the IPE's success, and Tulsa's role in the international oil industry, had both eroded: Tulsa's last IPE was held in 1979, while Houston has become the most prominent hub of the oil industry in the United States. In more recent times, Tulsa's continued use of "oil capital of the world" is often characterized as nostalgic or historical. But even today, energy is one of Tulsa's major industries, and many of the city's professional sports franchises have petroleum-related names such as the Tulsa Oilers (ice hockey), Tulsa Oilers (indoor football), Tulsa Drillers (baseball), and Tulsa Roughnecks (now FC Tulsa, men's soccer).

==== National Register of Historic Places designation ====
In 2010, Tulsa officially designated the central part of its downtown as the "Oil Capital Historic District" for the purposes of a proposed registration in the National Register of Historic Places. The district, at 36.151°N 95.990°W, is bounded by Third Street on the north, Cincinnati Avenue on the east, Seventh Street on the south and Cheyenne Avenue on the west. It was officially listed on December 13, 2010, under Criterion A for significance in Commerce. Its NRIS number is 10001013.

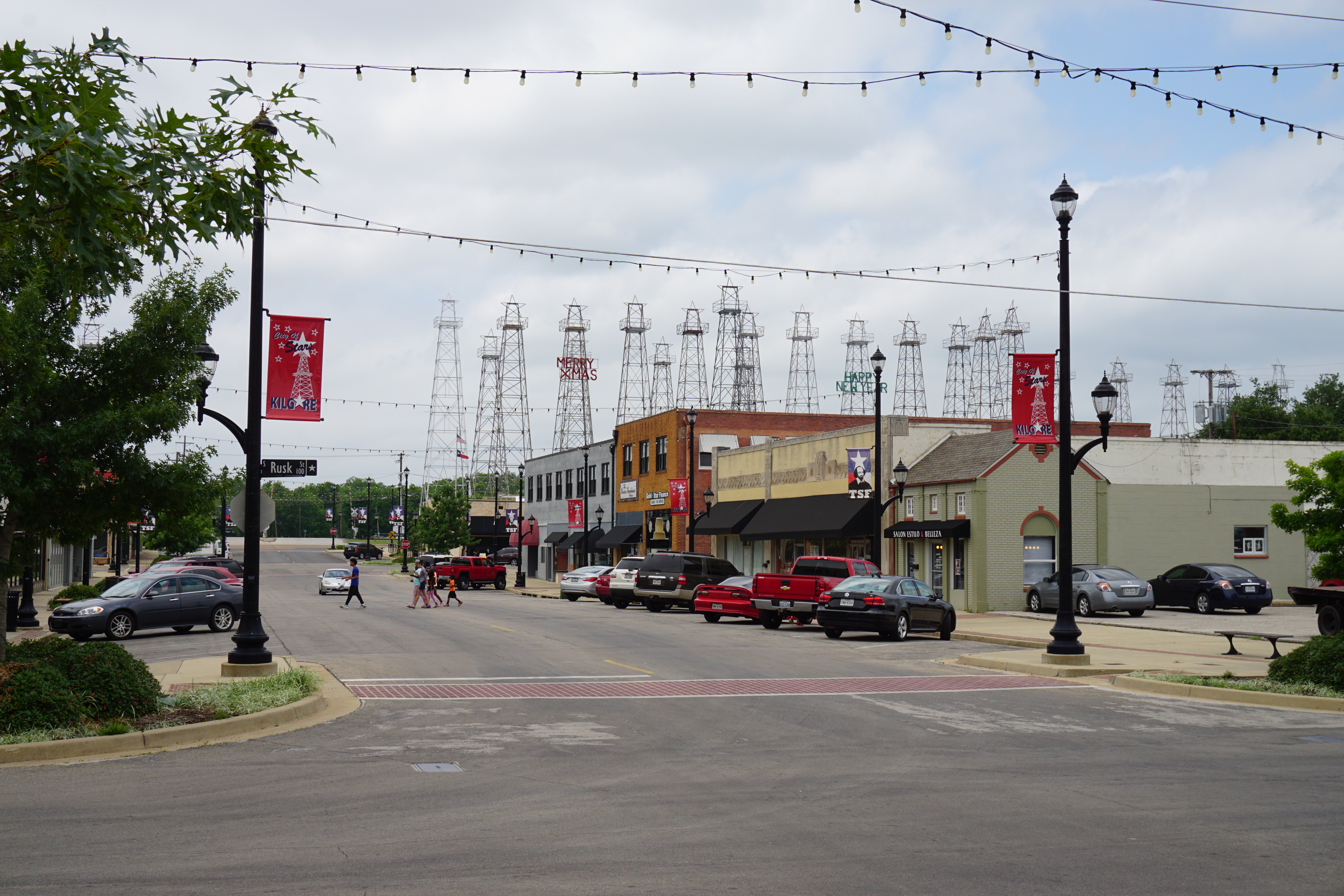
World's Richest Acre Park in Downtown Kilgore, where the greatest concentration of oil wells in the world once stood in Kilgore, Texas

=== Kilgore's claim ===
During the 1930s, Kilgore, Texas emerged as the epicenter of the East Texas Oil Field - the largest oil field in the contiguous United States at the time. Kilgore's transformation was unprecedented: its population exploded from 800 to over 10,000 within months of the 1930 discovery. The city became known as the "Oil Capital of the World" due to its dense concentration of derricks, with over 1,100 wells within city limits at the boom's peak. The most famous site was the "World's Richest Acre", a single city block containing 24 producing wells. This title was formally recognized by the State of Texas in 1965 with an official historical marker acknowledging Kilgore's pivotal role in American petroleum history. The Kilgore Drillers (baseball) where also named during this time.

== See also ==
- History of Kilgore, Texas
