= Fair Meadows Race Track =

Race track in Oklahoma, United States

- Location: 4705 East 21st Street; Tulsa, Oklahoma
- Coordinates: 36°8′13.19″N 95°55′27.10″W
- Owned by: Tulsa County Public Facilities Authority
- Race type: Thoroughbred, Quarter Horse, Appaloosa, and Paint Horse

Fair Meadows Race Track is a large race track and betting center located in Tulsa, Oklahoma. The track features live horse races Thursday through Sunday from early June to late July at its facility at Expo Square Pavilion in the Tulsa State Fairgrounds.

While the Expo Square is known for the annual Chili Bowl Midget Nationals & Tulsa Shootout races in the Expo Center, the Fair Meadows Race Track has hosted some motorsports events as well. It hosted 2 USAC Silver Crown Champ Car Series events in 2003 & 2004 on the mile.
