= Our Lady of the Rockies =

Statue in Butte, Montana by Bob O'Bill

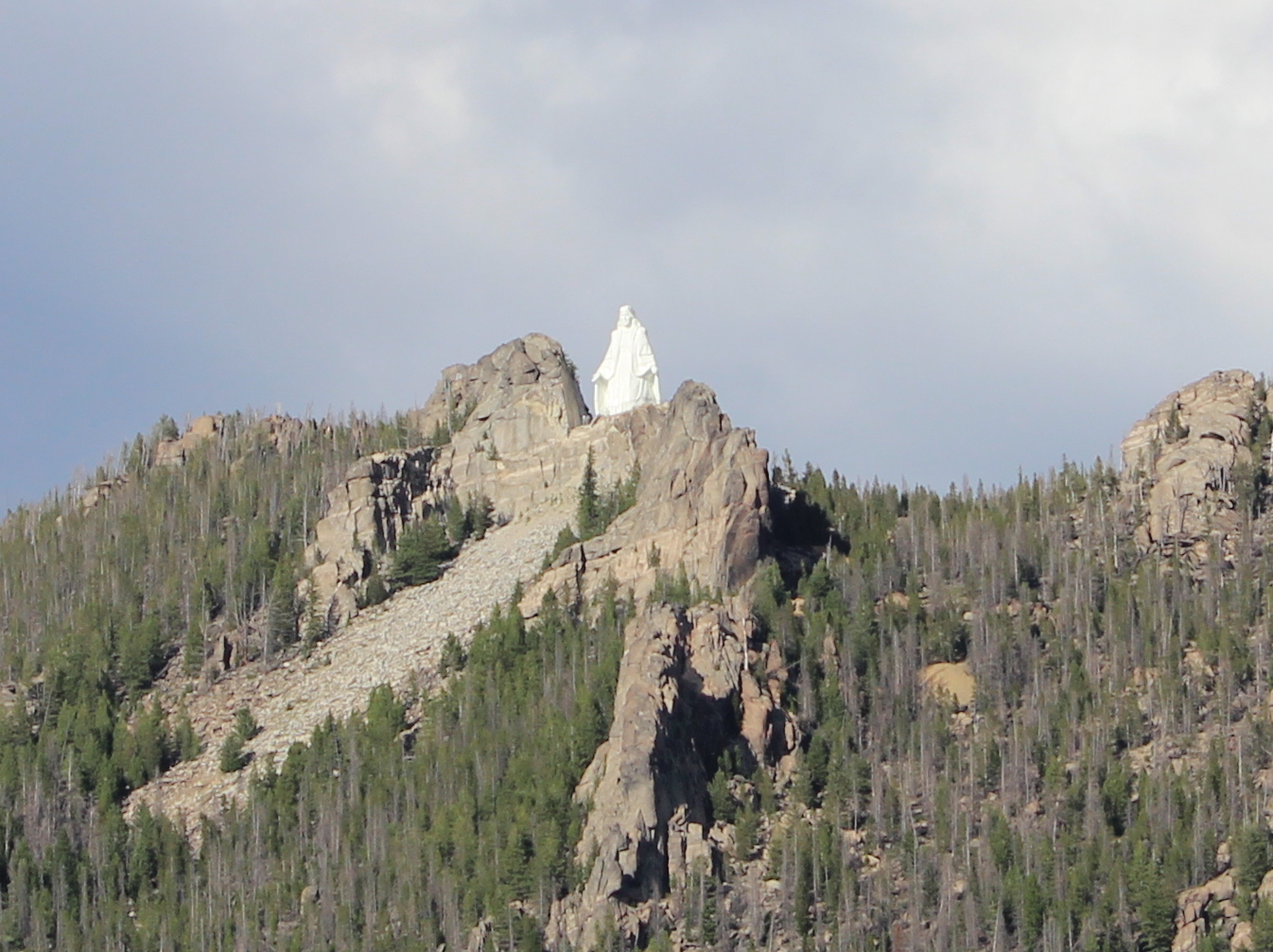
- The statue atop a mountain
- Interactive map of Our Lady of the Rockies
- Location: Butte, Montana, United States
- Coordinates: 46.000472°N 112.446272°W
- Type: Statue
- Height: 27 metres (89 ft)
- Beginning date: December 29, 1979
- Completion date: December 20, 1985
- Dedicated to: Blessed Virgin Mary
- Website: https://ourladyoftherockies.org/

Our Lady of the Rockies is a 90-foot (27 m) statue built in the likeness of Mary, the mother of Jesus, that stands atop the Continental Divide overlooking Butte, Montana, United States.

It is the fifth-tallest statue in the United States after Birth of the New World, the Statue of Liberty, the Pegasus and Dragon, and the Statue of Union. The base is 8,510 feet above sea level and approximately 3,000 feet above the town. The statue sits on private land and is lit and visible at night.

The statue was originally conceived by Butte resident Bob O'Bill in 1979 as a tribute to the Virgin Mary following the recovery of his wife from cancer. Later, the statue was additionally dedicated to "all women, especially mothers."

== Construction ==
The statue was first imagined by Bob O'Bill in 1979 during a time when his wife was seriously ill with cancer. O'Bill decided he would build a statue of Our Lady of Guadalupe if his wife would survive. His wife did recover. He began the project and eventually built a 90-foot mountaintop statue.

The statue was largely constructed using donations of money, materials, and labor from the local community. The design was made by Leroy Lee, the welder who fabricated the statue with help from Ron Hughes.

Work on the project began December 29, 1979. The base of the statue was poured in September 1985 with 400 tons of concrete. On December 17, 1985, a CH-54 Tarhe from the Army National Guard's 137th Aviation Company airlifted the statue in four sections to its present location at Saddle Rock atop Butte's East Ridge. The land for the site was donated by Guy Ossello. The head was placed on December 20, 1985.

== Tourism ==
The Our Lady of the Rockies gift shop in Butte offers bus tours to the statue during summer.

== Controversy ==
=== Opposition ===
Prior to the statue being erected, some residents voiced opposition to the project on religious grounds.

In 1981, evoking the doctrine of separation of church and state, Catholic priest Father Edward Hislop was quoted in The Montana Standard as saying, "Although the statue is on private ground, it is clearly in a public place. The East Ridge has always belonged to the people of Butte, and that might be offensive to some and pose difficulties."

In March 1985, nationally syndicated advice columnist Ann Landers published a letter from a reader complaining that "one religious group in Butte, Mont., is forcing its religious beliefs on an entire city."

=== Job Corps involvement ===
In August 1994, the Freedom From Religion Foundation received notice from one of its members that the nearby Anaconda Job Corps was involved in building a chapel at the statue site in Butte. Objecting to the use of federal resources in the construction of a place of worship, the foundation filed a letter of complaint with the U.S. Department of Labor, which on September 11 ceased the Job Corps' involvement.

=== Tram to the site ===
In July 2005, a group of homeowners sued Our Lady of the Rockies over plans to use a road near their homes to build a tram to the statue. The plans were approved by Butte district court, but on appeal, the Montana Supreme Court ruled in April 2008 that the road is in fact private and cannot be used for the tram. Plans for the tram remain unrealized.

== See also ==
- List of tallest statues
- List of the tallest statues in the United States
