= Tulsa Driller =

Tulsa Driller may refer to:

- Golden Driller, a statue in Tulsa
- Tulsa Drillers, minor league baseball team in Tulsa
