= Iron Man (Minnesota statue) =

American statue of an iron miner

- The statue in 2009
- Artist: Jack E. Anderson
- Year: 1987
- Type: Sculpture
- Medium: Iron
- Location: Chisholm, Minnesota; 47°28′53″N 92°53′46″W

The Iron Man statue is a figure of an iron miner located at the entrance to the Minnesota Discovery Center 1.28 kilometres (0.80 mi) outside of Chisholm, Minnesota. It is 85-foot-tall (26 m), including the 36-foot-tall figure (11 m), and was completed in 1987 out of iron ore by Jack E. Anderson. The brass-and-copper 36-foot Iron Man is balanced atop a 49-foot structure of steel and is a tribute to the men who labored in the open-pit mines when the mining industry boomed on the Iron Range of northern Minnesota. The work is titled The Emergence of Man Through Steel and is the fifth-largest freestanding statue in the United States.

== Sculpture ==
The statue was created by Jack E. Anderson of Lake Linden, Michigan, who also created a Bishop Baraga sculpture in L'Anse, Michigan. Anderson said that the iron worker's posture represented the weariness of a day spent working in mines. The Ironman's facial features were taken from the miner Daniel Tolonen, an immigrant from Finland who resided in and is buried in Chisholm, Minnesota. Daniel Tolonen was present with five generations of his family on the day the statue was dedicated July 4, 1987, along with Governor Rudy Perpich and U.S. Representative James Oberstar among the day's speakers. It measures 85 feet (26 m) tall, from the base to the top of the helmet.

== See also ==
- Vulcan, the world's largest cast-iron statue, in Birmingham, Alabama, also known as Iron Man
- Iron: Man, a statue in Birmingham England
- List of tallest statues
- List of the tallest statues in the United States
