= Jack E. Anderson =

American sculptor (1929–1993)

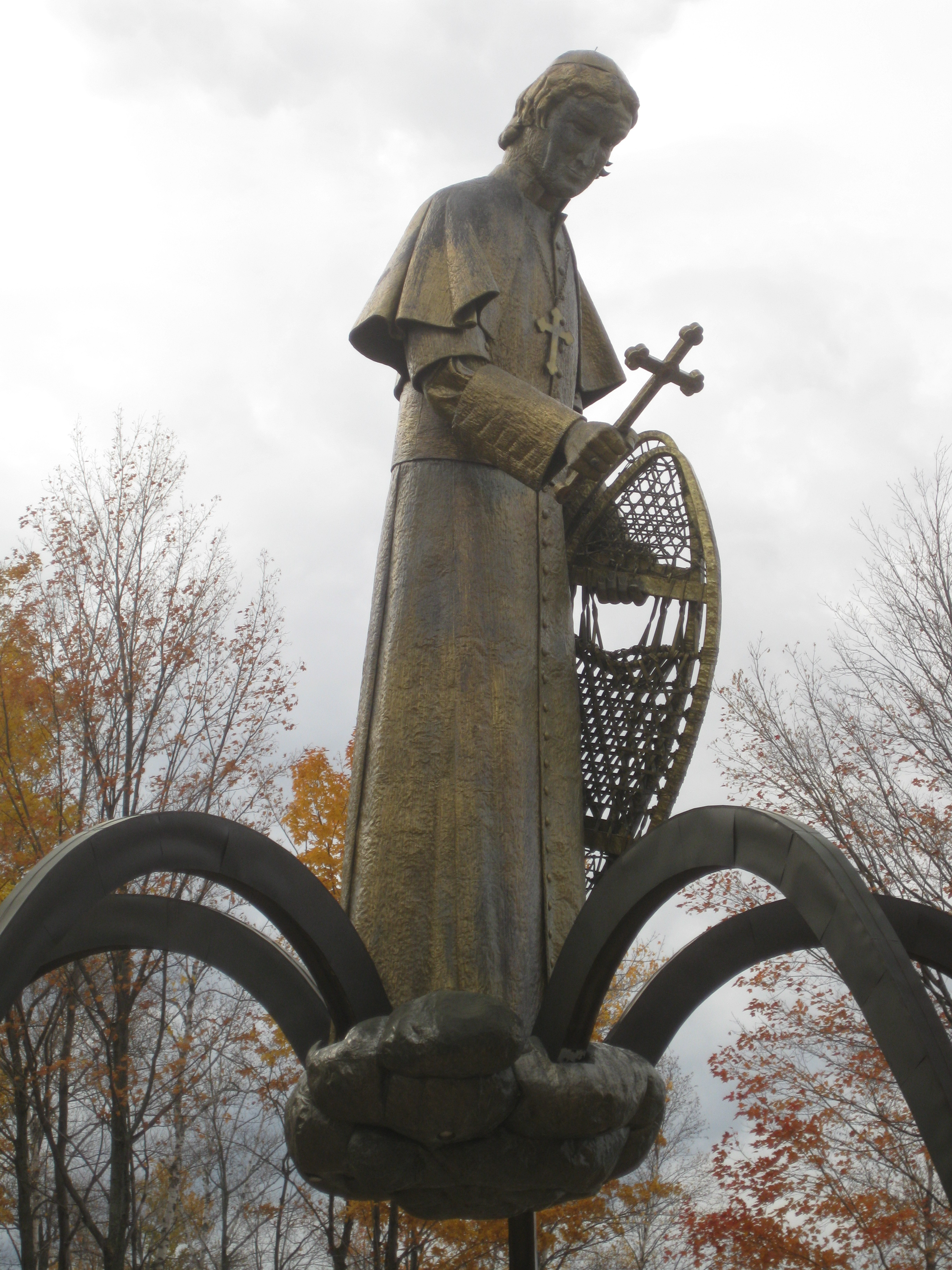
Jack E. Anderson's "Snowshoe Priest" (1969) sculpture of Bishop Frederic Baraga

Jack E. Anderson (September 10, 1929 – December 5, 1993) was a metal sculptor of large commemorative statues that are roadside attractions in the Midwestern United States. His work includes the 36-foot (11 m) tall figure that is part of the 81-foot (25 m) Iron Man statue at the entrance to the Ironworld Discovery Center, 1.3 kilometers outside Chisholm, Minnesota, and a statue dedicated to Bishop Baraga in L'Anse, Michigan. Anderson died December 5, 1993, while living in Chassell, Michigan.

== Iron Man ==
The Iron Man sculpture was erected as a tribute to miners of the Mesabi, Cuyuna, and Vermilion Iron Ranges of northeastern Minnesota. It is accompanied by a plaque with Veda Ponikvar's The Emergence of Man Through Steel poem and was completed in 1987 out of iron ore.

The statue, located on U.S. Route 169 in Minnesota, is the third largest Metal statue in the United States (behind the Statue of Liberty and Our Lady of the Rockies). The sculpture weighs 150 short tons (136 t) (the shovel weighs 400 pounds (181 kg) and each boot weighs 220 pounds (100 kg)); the base is constructed of Corten steel, which turns red with exposure.

== Bishop Baraga statue ==
The commemorative shrine for Bishop Frederic Baraga, the legendary "Snowshoe Priest", was built after organizing efforts in 1969 by residents of Baraga County and county clerk, author, and historian Bernard Lambert. They formed a foundation to plan and create the religious/historical monument and chose L'Anse ("end of the bay" in French) as the site because it was an area often traveled by Baraga. Anderson of Copper Country Arts in Lake Linden presented a scale model for the proposed 60-foot (18 m) high shrine inspired by Lambert's book Shepherd of the Wilderness.

The statue features a "35-foot (11 m) tall, hand-wrought brass statue of Baraga holding a 7-foot (2 m) cross in his right hand and a 26-foot (8 m) pair of snowshoes in his left" that "would ‘float' on a silver cloud of stainless steel" with laminated wood beams rising 25 feet (8 m) from five concrete tepees "representing missions established by Bishop Baraga", and set on top of the red rocks overlooking Lake Superior's Keweenaw Bay on land donated by the Patrick Ellico family.

Anderson began his work in 1970 with co-sculptor Arthur Chaput, Jr., while Yalmer Mattila Contracting Company of Houghton, Michigan, worked on the supporting base. Copper mined at the Copper Range Company's White Pine (Michigan) mine was made into brass and donated by the mining company. The Upper Peninsula Power Company provided free technical assistance, and the Evergreen Nurseries of Allegan, Michigan, donated a landscaping plan. The statue was placed on the pedestal on June 14, 1972. While the statue was being lowered and attached, a welding torch, which was being used to trim the bottom of the statue, ignited polyurethane insulation in the statue, "scorching the lacquer coating on the statue's exterior".

A dedication took place on September 16, 1973, as part of the annual Bishop Baraga Day Mass. It included blessings from Reverend Charles A. Salatka, Bishop of the Diocese of Marquette (the eighth successor to Bishop Baraga), and Reverend John Hascall, a Native American pastor in the Marquette Diocese, who "concluded the rite with prayer and burning of sweet grass, a traditional ritual used by Native Americans for all blessing." The Shrine site is near the trail that was used by the local Ojibwa and Bishop Baraga during their travels.

== See also ==
- Albert Paley
- Amin Gulgee
- Walenty Pytel
