= Healing Hands (statue) =

Statue in Tulsa, Oklahoma

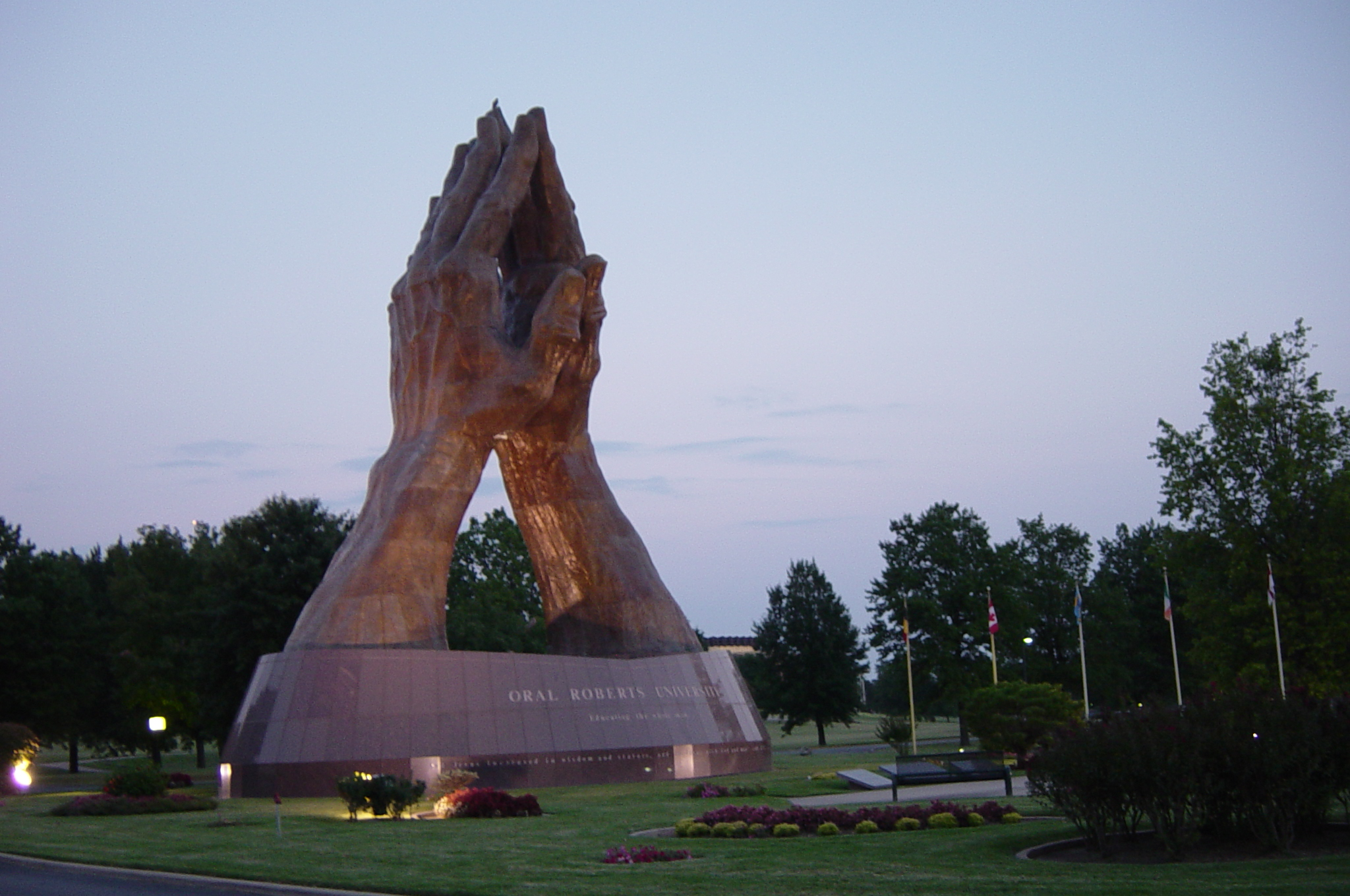
- Interactive map of Healing Hands
- Location: Tulsa, Oklahoma, United States
- Coordinates: 36.052026998782814°N 95.95661744755891°W
- Type: Statue
- Material: Bronze
- Height: 18.288 metres (60.00 ft)
- Completion date: 1980

The Healing Hands, commonly referred to as the Praying Hands, is a 60-foot-tall (18 m), 66,138-pound (30,000 kg) statue at the Oral Roberts University (ORU) campus in Tulsa, Oklahoma, depicting two hands in the act of prayer. The statue was created by sculptor Leonard McMurry and commissioned by pastor Oral Roberts.

The sculpture is made of pure bronze and is one of the largest bronze statues in the world. It currently holds the record for "world's largest praying hands statue".

According to ORU, the sculpture symbolizes "the University's mission to join human hands and work with those of God." It is one of the tallest statues in the United States.

== History ==
The Healing Hands were originally commissioned by televangelist and pastor Oral Roberts after he claimed to have experienced a vision in which a 900-foot-tall (270 m) figure of Jesus Christ appeared before him and called him to construct a faith-based medical center. This experience prompted Roberts in 1977 to construct the City of Faith Medical and Research Center, a three-building hospital complex now referred to as the CityPlex Towers. The statue was originally intended to be the welcoming centerpiece at the base of the complex.

The statue was created in 1980 by Oklahoma-based sculptor Leonard McMurry. The hands were cast in Ciudad Juarez, Mexico, sent to Tulsa in 450 separate pieces, and constructed at the base of City of Faith. It took three years for the statue to be completed.

Originally, McMurry sought to use Roberts' hands as the model for the statue, but Oral declined as he felt his hands, in his old age, were not representative of health. McMurry opted to use the hands of his friend and neighbor Gary Mitchell instead.

After a series of lawsuits, the City of Faith complex filed for bankruptcy in 1989 and the hospital was converted into office space. In 1991, the hands were transported less than a mile to Billy Joe Daugherty Circle at Oral Roberts University, where they remain today.

The inscription at the base of the statue reads: Oral Roberts University / Educating the whole man / "And Jesus increased in wisdom and stature, and in favor with God and man" Luke 2:52

== See also ==
- Golden Driller
- List of tallest statues
- List of the tallest statues in the United States
