= Sugar Land Quan Am =

Statue in Sugar Land, Texas, United States

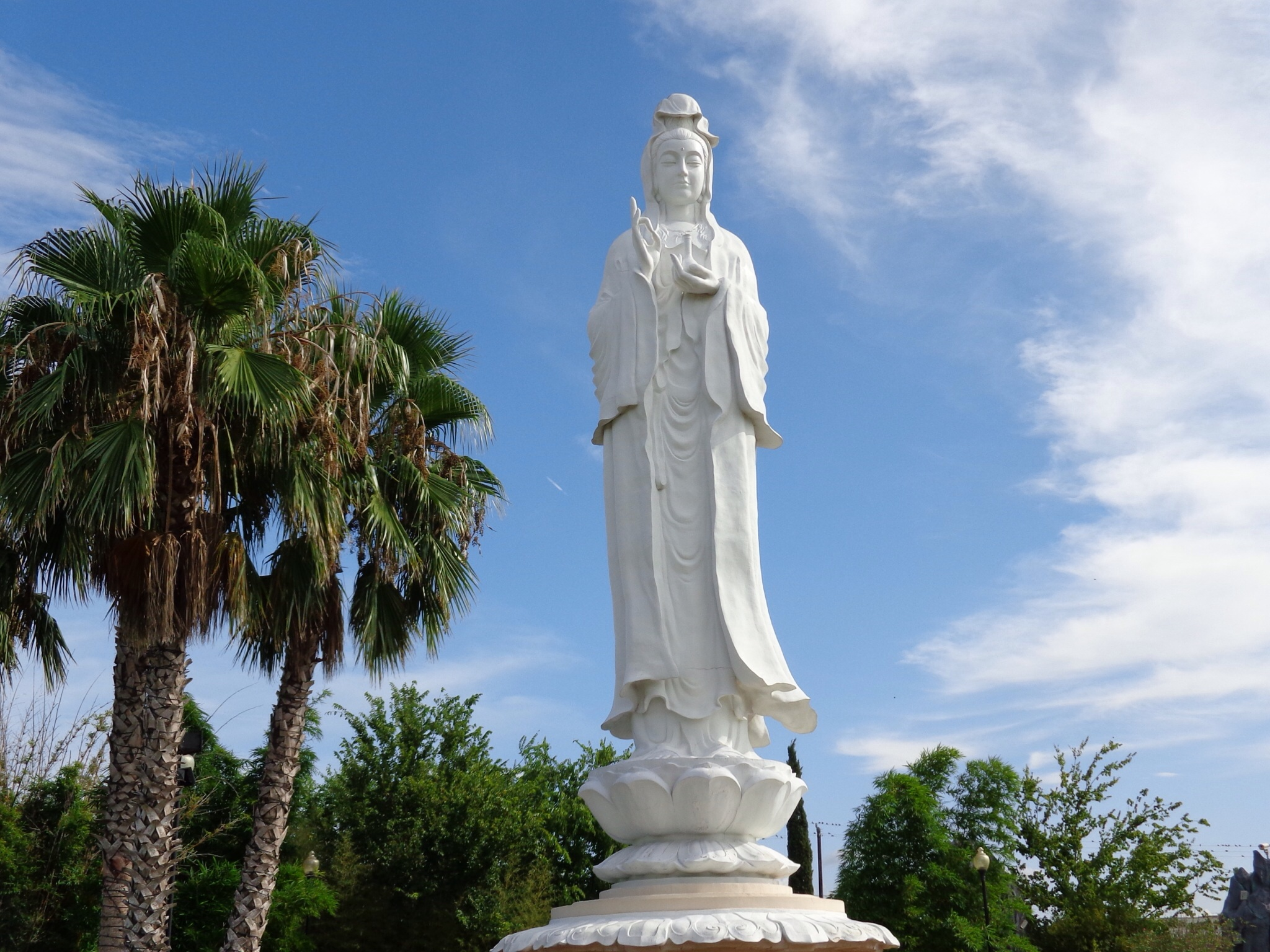
- The Sugar Land Quan Am Statue
- Interactive map of Sugar Land Quan Am
- Location: Sugar Land, Texas, United States
- Coordinates: 29.670853°N 95.617491°W
- Designer: Mai Chi Kim
- Type: statue
- Material: Cast concrete
- Height: 20 metres (66 ft)
- Beginning date: 1998
- Completion date: 2000

The Sugar Land Quan Âm is a cast concrete statue in Chùa Việt Nam (English: Vietnamese Buddhist Center) in Sugar Land, Texas, just outside of Houston. The sculpture depicts the bodhisattva Avalokiteśvara in female form standing on a lotus pedestal. She may also be commonly known by her Chinese name Guanyin. It was created by sculptor Mai Chi Kim, who wanted to work on a bigger project after the temple had commissioned several smaller statues from her.

With the base included, the statue stands at 72 feet tall, making it one of the tallest statues in the United States, and looks over a large pond beside an ornate red bridge. It held the claim to being the largest Buddhist statue in the Western Hemisphere, until 2021 when Brazil completed construction of the second tallest Buddha statue in the world. It is the sixth tallest statue in the United States as of 2021.

Quan Am is one of the most highly revered bodhisattvas in Vietnam and is called by many epithets, including 'Mother of Buddhas' and 'Goddess of Compassion'.

== See also ==
- List of the tallest statues in the United States
- Avalokiteśvara
- Guanyin
- Bodhisattva
- Buddhism
