= Chili Bowl Nationals =

Indoor midget car racing event

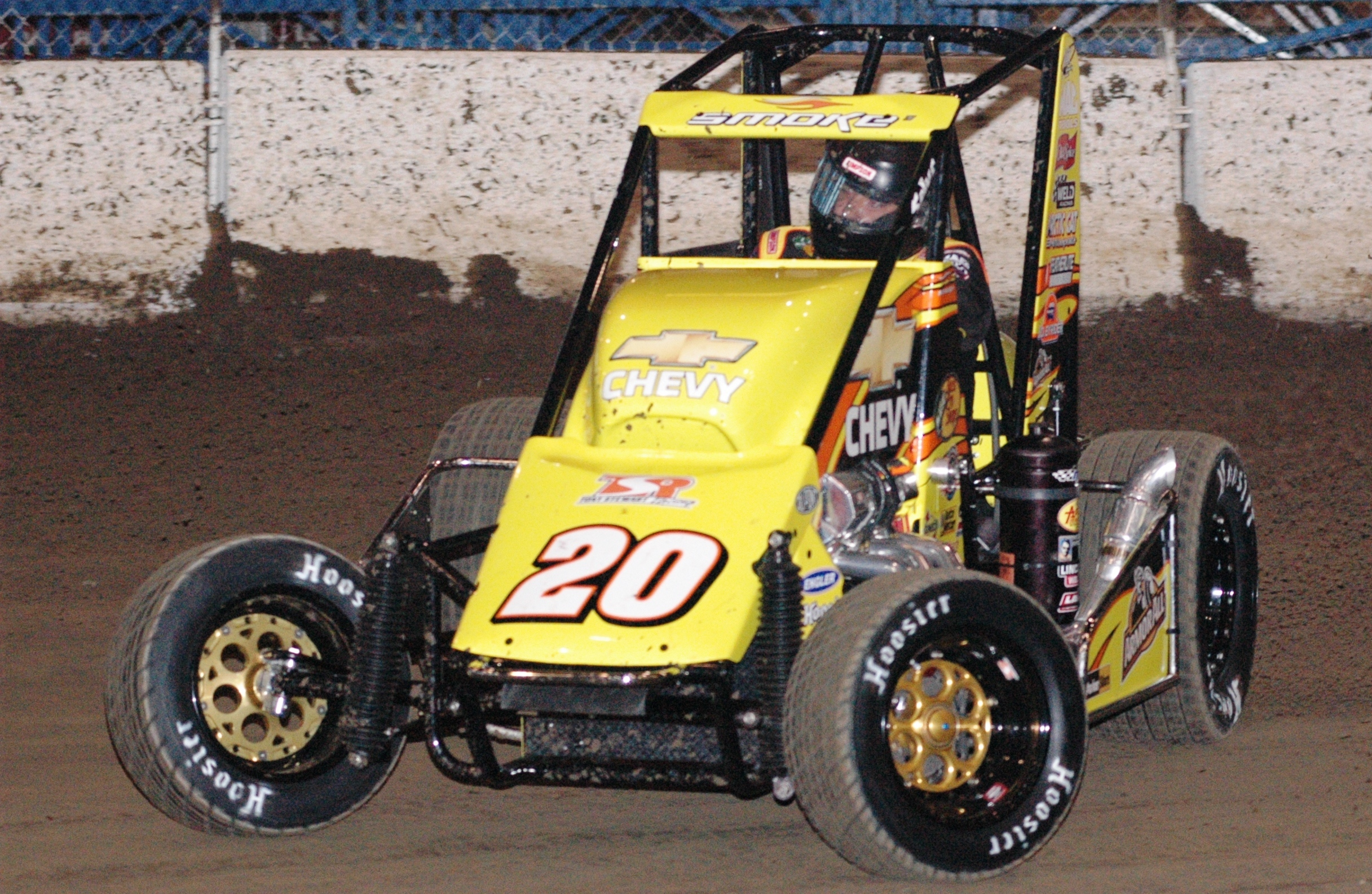
Tony Stewart racing at the 2008 Chili Bowl

The Chili Bowl Midget Nationals is an indoor midget car race that takes place in January on a 1/5 mi (0.32 km) dirt oval track at the Tulsa Expo Center in Tulsa, Oklahoma, United States. NASCAR calls it the "biggest Midget race of the year". It is nicknamed the "Super Bowl of midget racing".

== History ==
The inaugural Chili Bowl was organized by Lanny Edwards and partner Emmett Hahn. It was named after a local company who sponsored the first event.

The inaugural 1987 event consisted of 52 midgets competing in the two-day event. The event now consists of five days of qualifiers for the Saturday night A-main event, with over 341 cars entered for the 2020 race. One fifth of the drivers compete in each qualifying night's event, attempting to qualify for the A-main. Each qualifying night has heat races, dash-type events, and a 25 lap feature. Drivers who finish poorly in their heat event in their qualifying night start deep in final night qualifying events and have to finish high in many events to make the A-main field. A driver who started in the lowest "P" event would have to finish high in P, O, N, M, L, K, J, I, H, G, F, E, D, C, and B events to reach the A-main. The top two finishers in the qualifying night's feature event, plus the top seven finishers from the two Saturday night B-main events will progress into the Saturday 40-lap A feature, with a field of between 24 and 26 cars.

The event also has rewards for winning. The winner of the second-night Race of Champions between past Chili Bowl winning drivers, drivers nominated by former race champion teams, and the reigning national Midget Driver of the Year will be awarded a guaranteed starting position. If the driver who won the preceding year's Chili Bowl or the Race of Champions fail to qualify, they are added as the 25th and 26th cars in the field.

The National Midget Auto Racing Hall of Fame uses the event to induct its next class of members.

Originally, the event was held in the week ending on the second Saturday of January. Since 2009, the event usually ends on the third Saturday of January.

The fans of the Chili Bowl have long supported the flip count, and though for a while the flip count was maintained by event staff, and even given a digital readout courtesy of World Wide Technology Raceway, the Chili Bowl has never officially recognized the stat. The flip count over the years:

- 2024: TBD
- 2023: Stopped at 29
- 2022: 67
- 2021: 69
- 2020: 77
- 2019: 75
- 2018: 70
- 2017: 46
- 2016: 59
- 2015: 61

== Facility ==
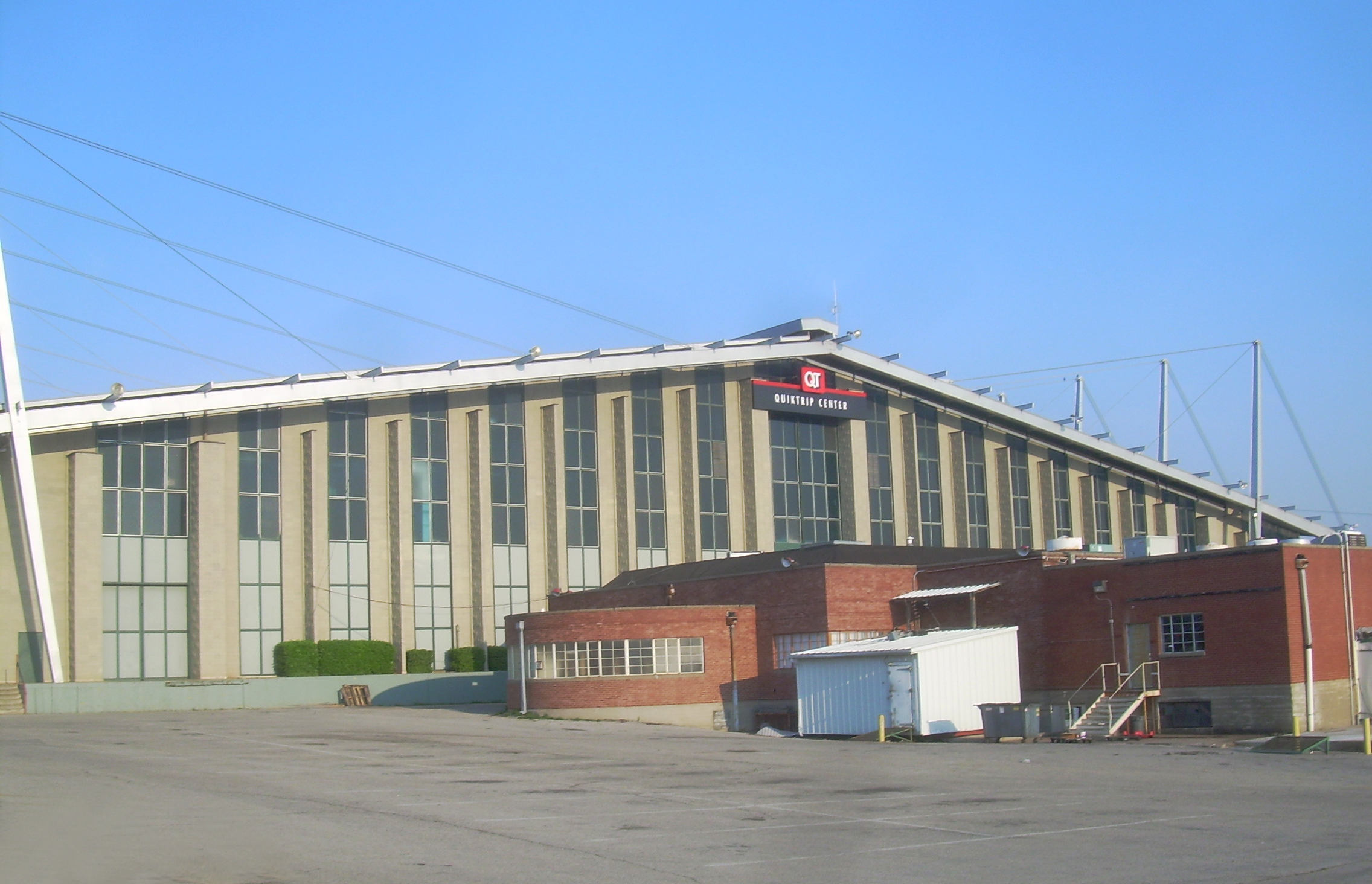
Home of the Chili Bowl, the Tulsa Expo Center

The event is held at the Tulsa Expo Center, the home of The Golden Driller. It accommodates hundreds of race cars, bleachers for 15,000 fans, and a trade show, all under one roof.

The clay which once covered the adjacent fairgrounds is used for the event. The fifth-mile indoor track is not affected by adverse weather or drying from the wind or sun.

== Drivers ==
Drivers in other series who come from a midget car background frequently race in the event. The 2007 competitors included NASCAR drivers Tony Stewart, Justin Allgaier, J. J. Yeley, A. J. Fike, Josh Wise, Kasey Kahne, and Jason Leffler, World of Outlaws sprint car drivers Terry McCarl, Tim McCreadie, Danny Lasoski, and Sammy Swindell, NHRA drag racing champions Cruz Pedregon and Gary Scelzi, IndyCar drivers A. J. Foyt IV, Tom Bigelow, and Billy Boat, and numerous USAC racers. Drivers in 2008 came from 29 American states, Canada, and Australia.

NASCAR driver Tony Stewart, a two-time winner of the event, said

This is the only place that you can take the best Midget drivers from USAC and Badger [Midget Auto Racing Association], and guys in the Rocky Mountain Midget Association, guys from USAC Sprint Cars and Silver Crown Cars and the World of Outlaws, all the best in dirt open-wheel racing. Those drivers are all at one place for the weekend, and when you've got [all those] guys competing for just the 24 starting spots in the A-Main, you have some of the best racing that you're going to see all year all in one week at the Chili Bowl.

USAC Triple Crown winner Dave Darland said, "You've got guys from all over the world. New Zealand, Australia, NASCAR, NHRA, Indy Cars -- you know, there's just all sorts of different competition there, all sorts of different levels of drivers."

=== List of A-Main Winners ===
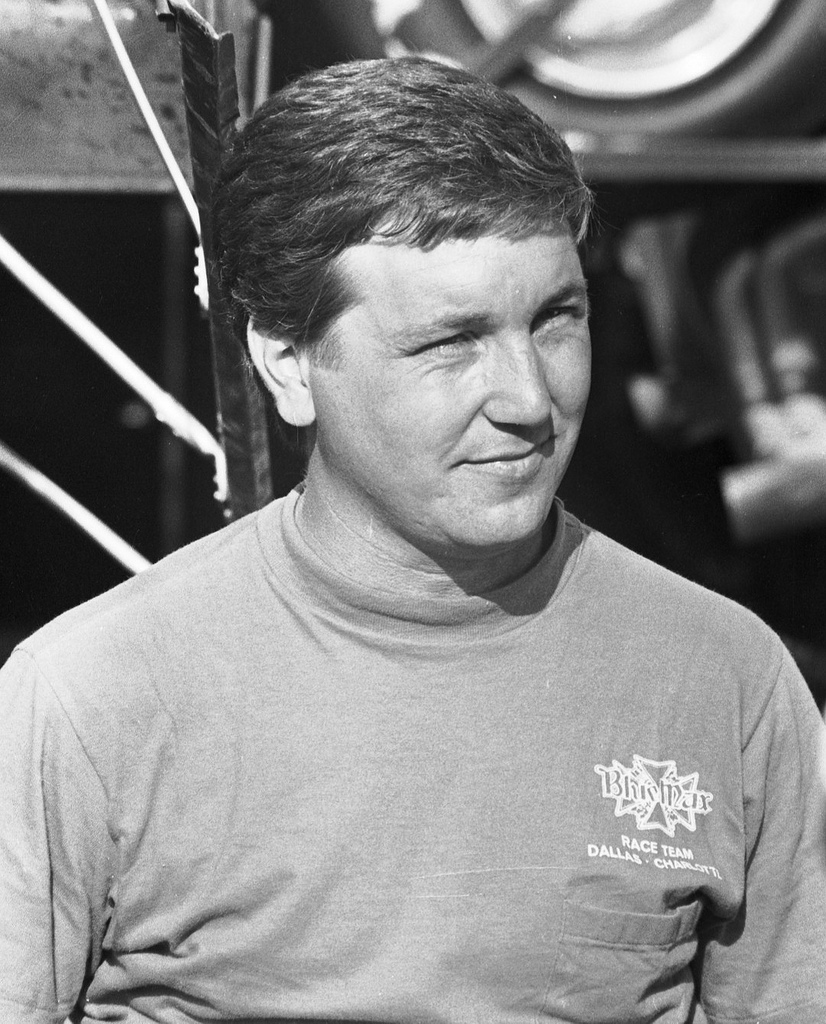
Five-time Chili Bowl winner Sammy Swindell

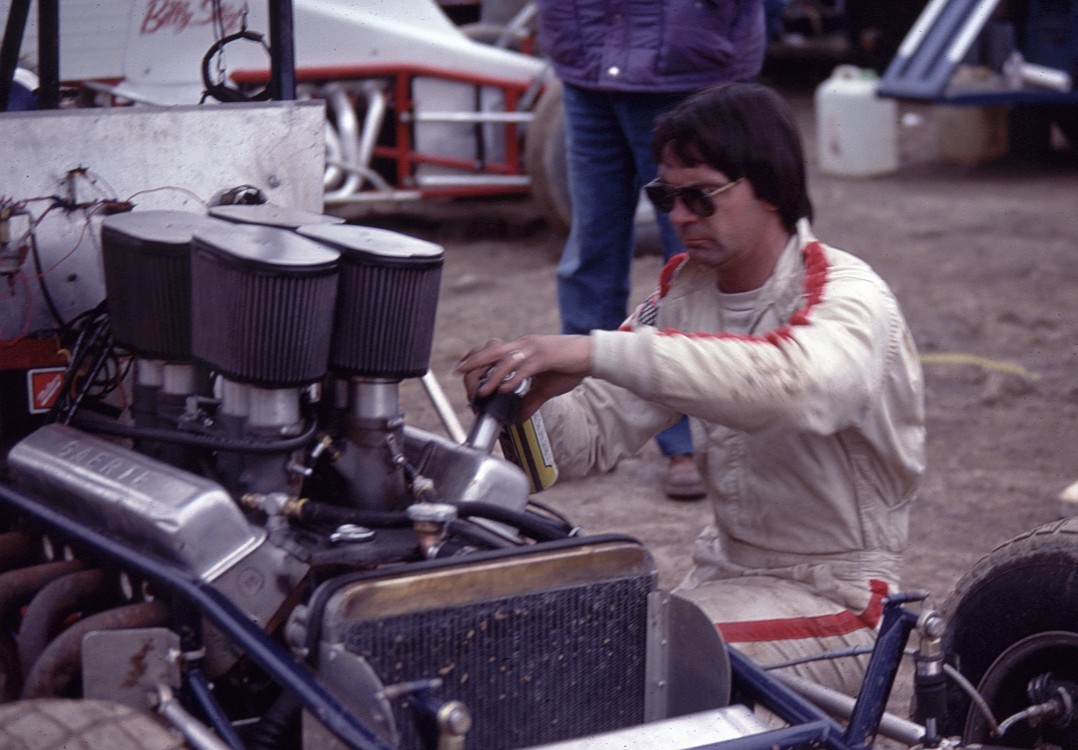
1987 winner Rich Vogler

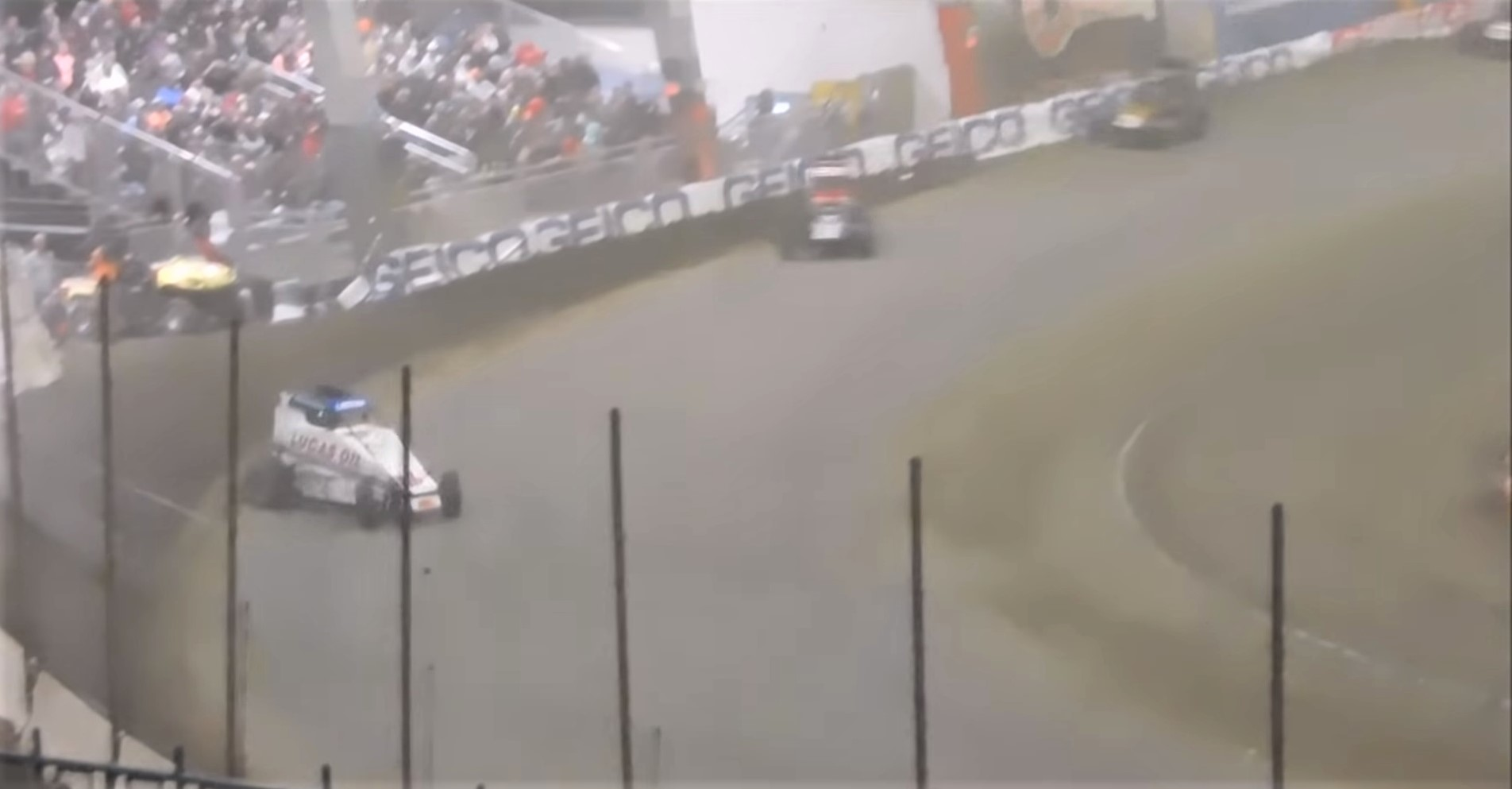
Kyle Larson leading at the 2020 Chili Bowl Nationals

The A-Main feature was originally a 50-lap main event. In 2012, following a family domestic violence incident that killed driver Donnie Ray Crawford III, who was participating in the event and was leaving for the venue to participate in Saturday's races when the incident occurred, and was to have attended the University of Oklahoma the next week, the race was expanded to 55 laps (his car number). For 2025 only, the feature race length was reduced to 40 laps. Drivers with multiple wins include five-time winner Sammy Swindell, Sammy's son Kevin Swindell with four wins, three-time winners Christopher Bell and Kyle Larson, and two-time winners Dan Boorse, Tony Stewart, Cory Kruseman, Rico Abreu and Logan Seavey. The winning driver wins a trophy dubbed the "Golden Driller" after the 76-foot (23 m) statue outside the building.

- 1987 – Rich Vogler
- 1988 – Scott Hatton
- 1989 – Sammy Swindell
- 1990 – Johnny Heydenreich
- 1991 – Lealand McSpadden
- 1992 – Sammy Swindell (2)
- 1993 – Dave Blaney
- 1994 – Andy Hillenburg
- 1995 – Donnie Beechler
- 1996 – Sammy Swindell (3)
- 1997 – Billy Boat
- 1998 – Sammy Swindell (4)
- 1999 – Dan Boorse
- 2000 – Cory Kruseman
- 2001 – Jay Drake
- 2002 – Tony Stewart
- 2003 – Dan Boorse (2)
- 2004 – Cory Kruseman (2)
- 2005 – Tracy Hines
- 2006 – Tim McCreadie
- 2007 – Tony Stewart (2)
- 2008 – Damion Gardner
- 2009 – Sammy Swindell (5)
- 2010 – Kevin Swindell
- 2011 – Kevin Swindell (2)
- 2012 – Kevin Swindell (first 55 lap race) (3)
- 2013 – Kevin Swindell (4)
- 2014 – Bryan Clauson
- 2015 – Rico Abreu
- 2016 – Rico Abreu (2)
- 2017 – Christopher Bell
- 2018 – Christopher Bell (2)
- 2019 – Christopher Bell (3)
- 2020 – Kyle Larson
- 2021 – Kyle Larson (2)
- 2022 – Tanner Thorson
- 2023 – Logan Seavey
- 2024 – Logan Seavey (2)
- 2025 – Kyle Larson (3) (Reduced to 40 Lap Race)
- 2026 – Emerson Axsom
