= International Petroleum Exposition =

Trade fair held in Tulsa, Oklahoma from 1923 to 1979

The International Petroleum Exposition (IPE) was a specialized trade fair held in Tulsa, Oklahoma, at varying intervals from 1923 to 1979. Its main purposes were to display the latest oil industry technology, sell equipment and services, and to educate industry workers and the general public about the production of oil.

== History ==
William G. Skelly, a leading Tulsa oilman and entrepreneur, is credited with conceiving the International Petroleum Exposition in 1923, while he was serving as president of the Tulsa Chamber of Commerce. He became president of the IPE in 1925 and held that position for the rest of his life.

The first show was held in Tulsa on October 8–14, 1923. The city had been dubbed "Oil Capital of the World" and headquarters of many major oil companies and suppliers, so it seemed a logical choice. The venue was vacant ground downtown between Main to Cheyenne streets and from Archer to Cameron streets. Despite heavy rains during the week, and the fact that the city was still trying to recover from the Tulsa Race Massacre of 1921, the IPE drew enough visitors to be considered a success. The organizers decided to repeat the show annually.

From 1924 through 1927, the IPE show was held at the Tulsa circus grounds. In 1928, it moved to the Tulsa Fairgrounds, In 1930, the event was moved to May, to avoid conflict with the Tulsa State Fair, which was always presented in the fall at the fairgrounds. By 1930, had been extended to ten days and drew over 120,000 visitors. Some important industry groups such as the Mid-Continent Oil and Gas Association and the American Petroleum Institute scheduled meetings in Tulsa to coincide with the IPE.

The Great Depression reduced the frequency of the event after 1930. Thereafter it was held in 1934, 1936, 1938 and 1940. It was completely suspended until 1948 because of World War II. When it reopened in 1948, over 300,000 people visited the show. However, there was competition from other events and the event had become very costly to produce, so the directors voted to hold the exhibition every five years.

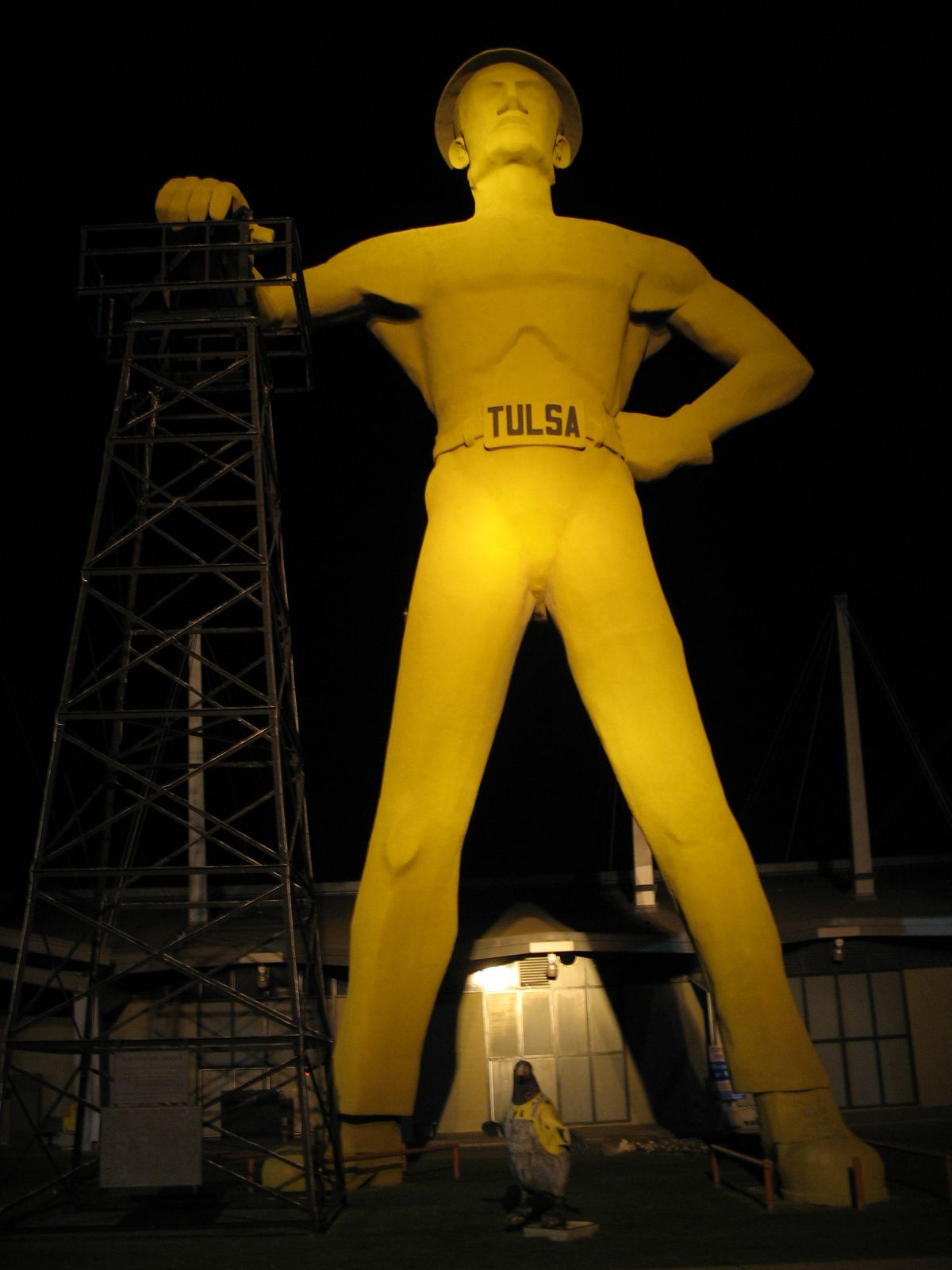
The Golden Driller statue was first erected at the International Petroleum Exposition in Tulsa in 1953. It was permanently installed there in 1966.

The next exposition was held in 1953. The Mid-Continent Supply Company commissioned the now-famous Golden Driller statue and displayed it at the entrance to the exhibition grounds. It drew so much favorable comment that the owner re-erected it in the next exposition in 1959.

In 1966, all of the exhibition buildings were demolished. They were replaced by a single hall that covered 10 acres (4.0 ha). At the time, it was said to be the largest single building under one roof. Originally called the International Petroleum Exposition Center (and often called the IPE Building), it was funded by a $3.5 million bond issue in 1966, and upon completion became home to the International Petroleum Exposition. The Golden Driller statue was relocated to the main entrance of the building.

== Demise of the IPE ==
The 1966 exhibition had the largest attendance in its history. The 1971 show was also successful. However, conditions in the industry were changing. Oil production had greatly moved outside of the United States and foreign producers had greater influence over the markets. Oil production also had moved offshore, as land-based wells had become relatively less profitable. The Houston-based Offshore Technology Conference siphoned attention away from the IPE. Attendance declined further in 1976. Oil prices collapsed in the late 1970s and early 1980s. After only 20 thousand visitors attended the 1979 exhibition, the IPE was permanently cancelled. The former IPE Building was later renamed as the Tulsa Expo Center.

== See also ==
- Golden Driller
- Tulsa Expo Center
