= Statue of Union =

Statue in Sugar Land, Texas

- Statue of Union
- Interactive map of Statue of Union
- Location: Sugar Land, Texas, United States
- Coordinates: 29.6700°N 95.6182°W
- Type: Statue
- Material: Panchaloha
- Height: 90 feet (27 m)
- Opening date: August 18, 2024; 2 years ago
- Dedicated to: Hindu God Hanuman
- Website: statueofunion.org

Statue of Union is a 90-foot (27 m) statue of the Hindu God Hanuman, that is located at Sri Ashtalakshmi Temple in Houston (with a postal address in Sugar Land, Texas, United States). It is the fourth-tallest statue in the United States after the Birth of the New World, the Statue of Liberty and the Pegasus and Dragon. The statue is named Statue of Union because Hanuman reunited Rama with Sita in the Hindu epic Ramayana. The statue symbolises “selflessness, devotion, and unity.”

== Construction ==
The Statue of Union was envisioned by an Indian spiritual leader Chinna Jeeyar Swami, who also envisioned the Statue of Equality in Hyderabad, India. He called the statue a spiritual epicenter for North America. The statue was designed by Chinna Jeeyar Swami in India. The parts were manufactured in China and then shipped to the United States and assembled at the temple. Sreenarasimhaiah, the temple's vice president, said that people of "all sorts of faiths" worked on the project locally.

The statue is cast in bronze. It is 90 feet tall and weights 90 tons. It depicts Hanuman in the upright position with both his palms facing forward. Its detailed craftsmanship includes his main weapon Gada with patterns around it. The base of the statue features detailed design of an elephant and flowers.

The unveiling of the statue took place after a 3-day ceremony that happened between August 15 and 18, 2024. It started on August 15, overlapping with India's Independence Day celebrations. The prana pratishtha took place at precisely 9:09 AM on August 18, 2024. The ceremony featured flower showering from a helicopter, a sacred water sprinkling, and a 72-feet-long garland draped around Hanuman's neck. The event was also accompanied by patriotic songs and the national anthems of India and the US, including "Vande Mataram," "Jana Gana Mana," and "The Star-Spangled Banner."

== Reception ==
The American Hindu community celebrated the installation of the statue. However, soon after the inauguration, the statue drew protests from some Christian conservatives, who gathered outside the temple, prayed against it, and described it as a "demon god" or idolatrous. Some online voices mocked the statue's simian appearance or called for legal challenges similar to those against Christian symbols elsewhere.

In September 2025, a Texas Republican leader Alexander Duncan called it "a false statue of a false Hindu God" claiming the United States is a "Christian nation" and must not allow such a construction. Duncan followed up by quoting Bible verses against idolatry (e.g., Exodus 20:3-4). This sparked widespread outrage, with groups like the Hindu American Foundation (HAF) calling it "anti-Hindu hate," inflammatory, and a violation of religious freedom/1st Amendment principles. They urged the Texas GOP to discipline him. Duncan later defended his comments as "merely asking a question" from a Christian perspective, not anti-Hindu. Critics tied it to rising anti-Indian/anti-Hindu sentiment amid debates over H-1B visas, immigration, and cultural changes in Texas (e.g., large Indian populations in areas like Sugar Land, Frisco, and Irving). Eventually, Duncan's Senate campaign faltered and he failed to advance in the primary race by late 2025, with some observers speculating that his remarks may have hurt his campaign.

== See also ==
- List of tallest statues
- List of the tallest statues in the United States
