= Saraswati (sculpture) =

Sculpture in Washington, D.C., U.S.

- Saraswati sculpture in 2026
- Year: 2013
- Type: Sculpture
- Subject: Saraswati and three students, including Barack Obama
- Dimensions: 4.9 m (16 ft)
- Location: Washington, D.C., United States; 38.9103°N 77.045829°W

Saraswati is an outdoor sculpture of the Hindu goddess of the same name, installed outside the Embassy of Indonesia in Embassy Row, Washington, D.C., in the United States. It was inaugurated by Indonesia's president Susilo Bambang Yudhoyono in 2014.

== Description and history ==
The work was created by multiple Balinese sculptors and installed in 2013. The 16-foot (4.9 m) gold and white statue depicts the Hindu goddess Saraswati standing on a lotus with three young students at her feet, one of which is Barack Obama.

== See also ==
- 2013 in art
- Public image of Barack Obama
