= SageNet Center =

Center of the Tulsa State Fair

Coordinates: 36°08′04″N 95°55′51″W

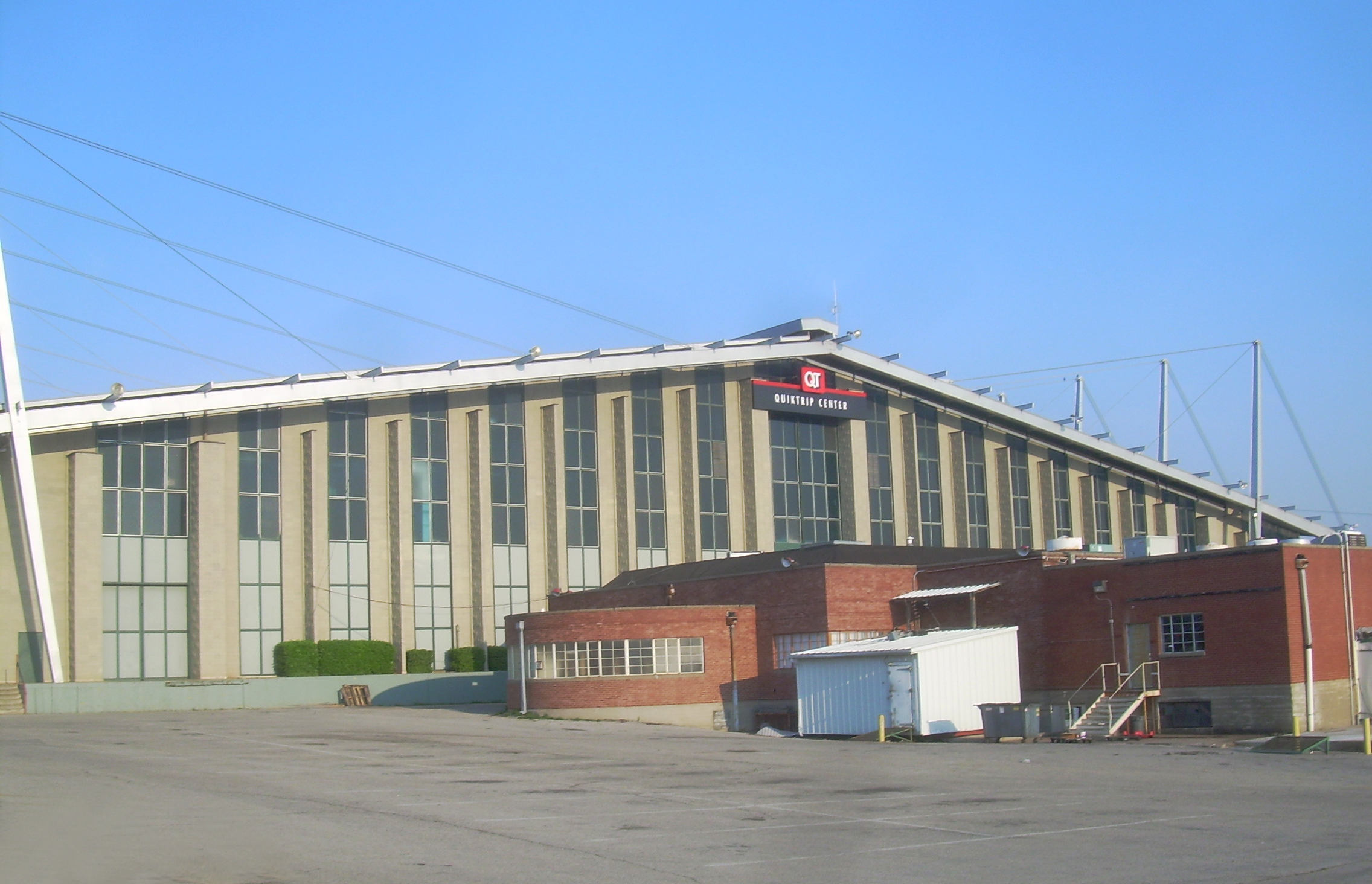
- Interactive map of the SageNet Center area
- Former names: I.P.E. Buliling; QuikTrip Center (2007–2012); River Spirit Expo (2013–2021)

General information
- Location: Tulsa, Oklahoma, United States
- Completed: 1966
- Cost: $3.5 million

Technical details
- Structural system: Steel beam
- Size: 446,400 square feet (41,470 m^{2})

SageNet Center, originally known as the Exposition Center from 1966 to 2007 and QuikTrip Center, until 2012, and River Spirit Expo from 2013 to 2021, is the center of the Tulsa State Fair and one of the largest clearspan buildings in the world. The Expo Center provides 354,000 square feet (32,900 m^{2}) of column-free space under a cable-suspended roof. The building spans 448,400 total square feet on two levels, connected by side ramps and stairs, allowing for a variety of show floor plans.

== History ==
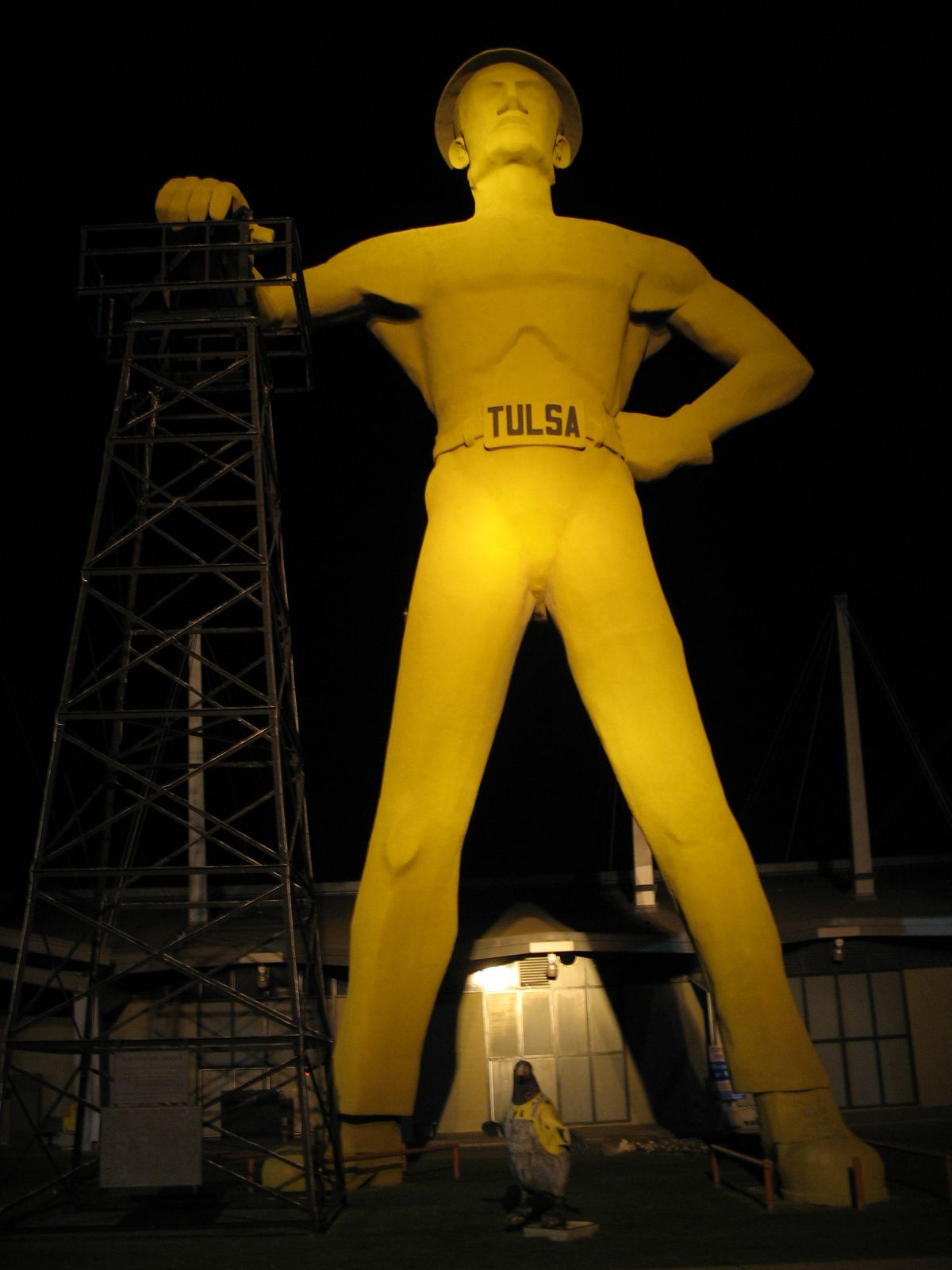
The Golden Driller

The Expo Center, originally called the International Petroleum Exposition Center (and often called the IPE Building), was funded by a $3.5 million bond issue in 1966, and upon completion became home to the International Petroleum Exposition. At the time of its completion, it was the world's largest building under a single roof. Standing in front of the Expo Center is the Golden Driller which was added as a symbol of the International Petroleum Exposition in 1966. Weighing 43,500 pounds and standing 76 feet (23 m) tall, the Golden Driller has become the symbol of Expo Square and a Tulsa landmark.

Design of the building was performed by David R. Graham and Associates of Tulsa. Team members included engineers David R. Graham, C.E.C, Melvin L. Sedlacek, C.E.C. and architect Bert E. Griffin, A.I.A. Sedlacek and Griffin received a second-place award from The James F. Lincoln Arc Welding Foundation in 1966 for their design paper submission. Their paper dealt with the unique method of framing the structure, whereby the roof is suspended with cables, such as used in bridge construction but rarely seen in buildings.

In July 2007 the building was renamed the QuikTrip Center, after Tulsa's QuikTrip Corporation paid $2.6 million as part of a reported 10-year naming rights agreement.

In November 2012 it was reported that the Muscogee (Creek) Nation had agreed to buy the naming rights for the building commencing in 2013, as part of a deal that would have also seen the end of horse racing at Expo Square's Fair Meadows Race Track. Several weeks later, however, the Fair Board voted to reconsider the decision and reinstate racing, which also had the effect of putting the new naming deal on hold.

In September 2021 the building was renamed once again, the SageNet Center.

== Events ==
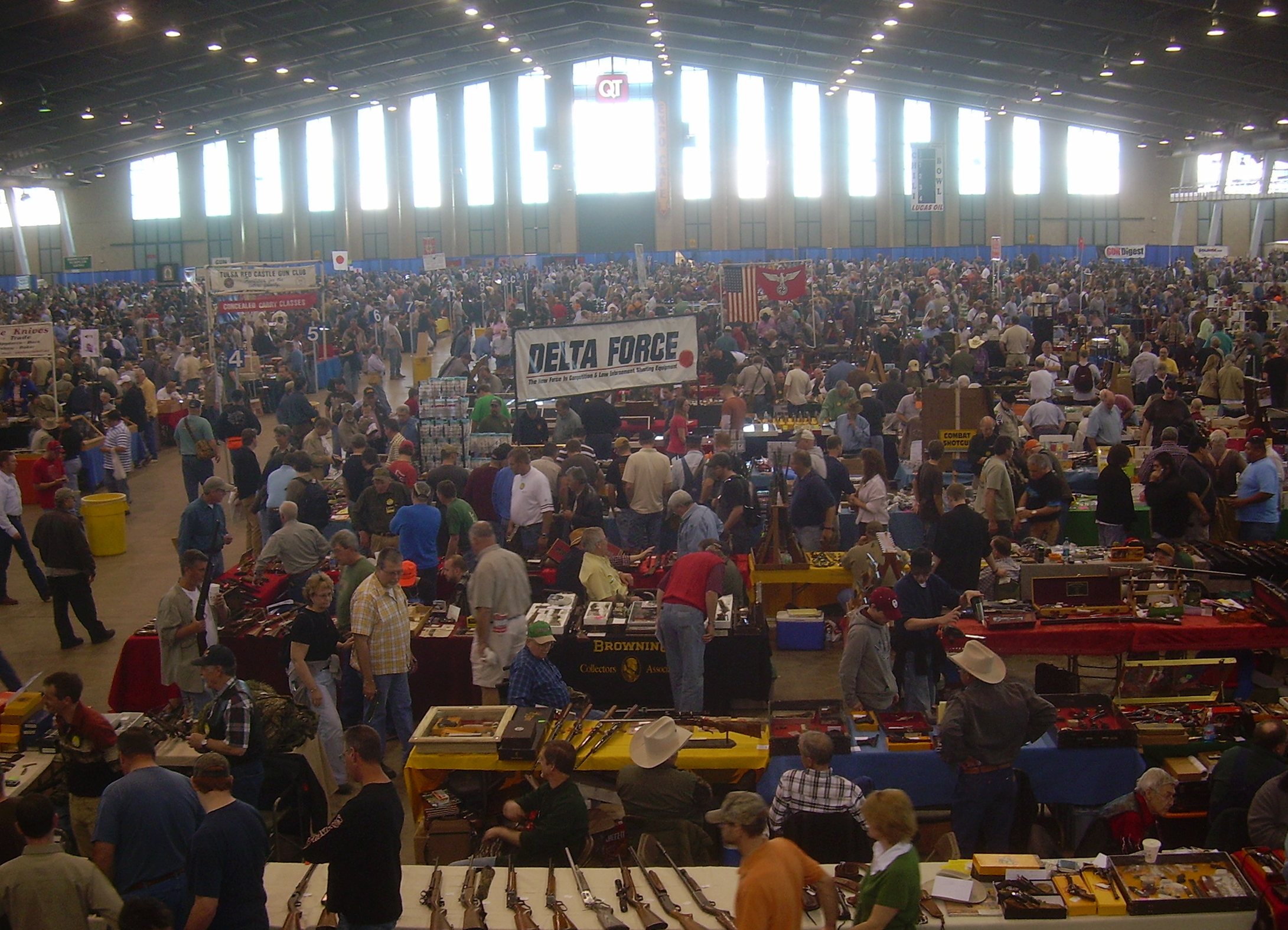
The 2008 Wanenmacher Gun Show inside Expo Center.

The building hosts many events throughout the year such as the Tulsa boat show, the Wanenmacher gun show (the largest gun show in the world), and Daryl Starbird's custom car show. During the Tulsa State Fair the largest facility is the Expo Center where vendors and exhibit booths line the entire floor, providing both educational and commercial services. The Chili Bowl midget car race is held each January in a clay track inside the center. The event attracts NASCAR and USAC drivers from around the country. Since 1998, the building has hosted the American Bicycle Association's annual Grand National Championships, a major event for BMX bikers.

== See also ==
- List of tallest statues
