= Vulcan statue =

- U.S. National Register of Historic Places
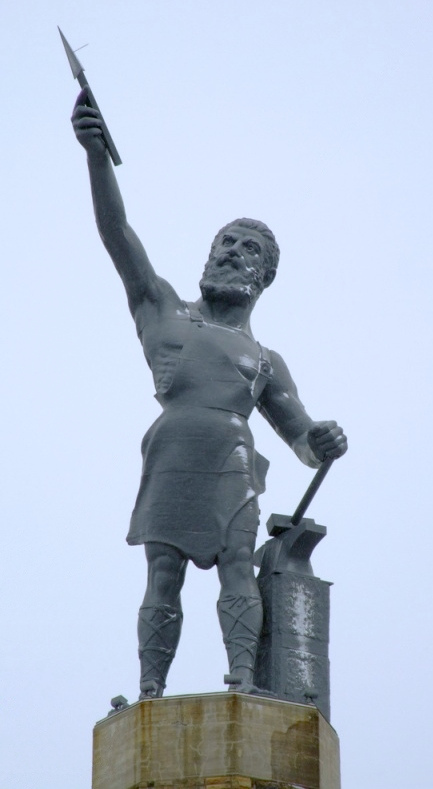
- Vulcan

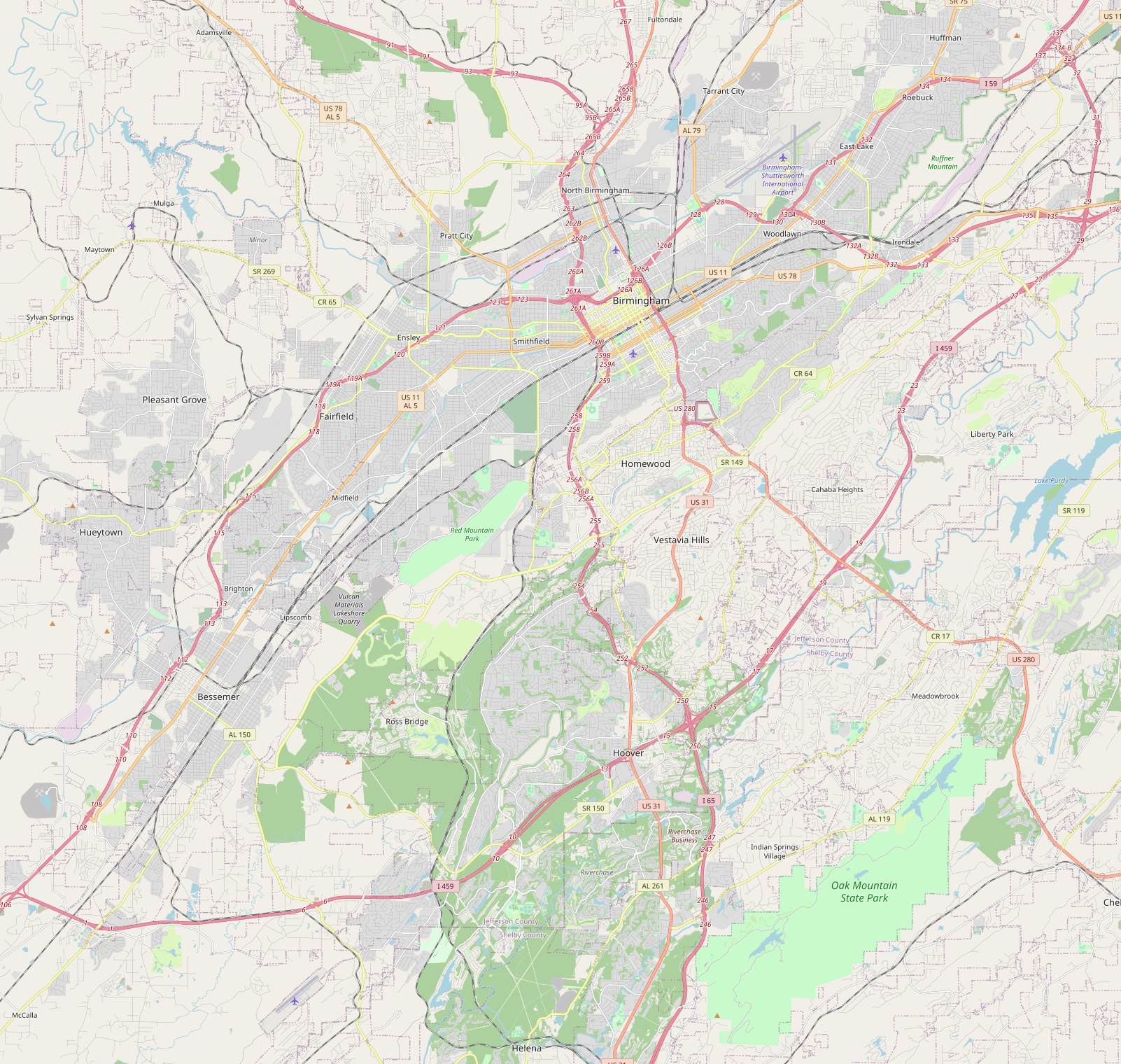
- Location within Birmingham, Alabama Location within Alabama Location within the United States
- Location: Red Mountain, Birmingham, Alabama
- Coordinates: 33°29′30.18″N 86°47′43.86″W
- Area: 4 acres (1.6 ha)
- Built: 1904, 1939
- Sculptor: Giuseppe Moretti
- NRHP reference No.: 76000333
- Added to NRHP: July 6, 1976

The Vulcan statue (also referred to by some as The Magic Man) is the largest cast iron statue in the world, and is the city symbol of Birmingham, Alabama, United States, reflecting its roots in the iron and steel industry. The 56-foot (17 m) tall statue depicts the Roman god Vulcan, god of the fire and forge, with ironworking equipment. It was created as Birmingham's entry for the Louisiana Purchase Exposition (1904 World's Fair) in St. Louis, Missouri. While it is the world's largest made of iron, it is also among the nation's tallest statues of any kind.

== History ==
=== Construction ===
Commissioned by the Commercial Club of Birmingham, Italian-born sculptor Giuseppe Moretti began designing the monumental figure in 1903, using a 6-foot (183 cm) tall model to study the form. He next sculpted a clay master model in an unfinished church in Passaic, New Jersey, and this was then divided into sections and transported by railroad to the Birmingham Steel and Iron Company for the preparation of casting molds for the iron.

Moretti received an artist's fee of $6,000, which would be about $210,000 in 2025 dollars. The Commercial Club of Birmingham held art shows, concerts, baseball games, and many more activities to raise the estimated $15,000 ($540,000 in 2025 dollars) it would cost to build and transport the statue. It is also noted that pot metal statuettes of Vulcan were sold at both the St. Louis World's Fair and in Birmingham, Alabama for two dollars apiece to help in the accumulated costs it took to create the statue.

The Vulcan statue consists of 29 cast-iron components with connecting flanges that are bolted together internally. The heaviest section is his whole head, which weighs 11,000 pounds (4,990 kg). Iron forgemen designed and executed the connection details for the statue, which originally had no internal framework and was self-supporting. The grey iron castings were made in Birmingham entirely from locally produced iron.

The completed weight of the god Vulcan's figure alone is 100,000 pounds (45,359 kg). When Vulcan's anvil, block, hammer, and spearpoint are added, the statue weighs a total of 120,000 pounds (54,431 kg) and it stands on a 123-foot-tall (37 m) pedestal. The statue has a chest circumference of 22 feet 6 inches (7 m) and a waist circumference of 18 feet 3 inches (6 m).

=== 1904 World's Fair ===
The statue was shipped to St. Louis as Birmingham's entry into the 1904 World's Fair. Vulcan dramatically demonstrated the mineral riches and manufacturing capabilities of the Birmingham area while on display in the Louisiana Purchase Exposition's "Palace of Mines and Metallurgy". It was awarded a "Grand Prize".

When the 1904 World's Fair ended, the Vulcan statue was dismantled and returned to its home city of Birmingham, only to be left in pieces alongside the railroad tracks due to unpaid freight bills.

=== Alabama State Fairgrounds ===
The Vulcan statue was eventually re-erected at the Alabama State Fairgrounds, but the statue's arms were installed incorrectly, and the god was without his spear, which had been lost on the way from St. Louis.

With nothing to hold in its hands, Vulcan soon became an advertising figure. Over the years, Vulcan held an ice cream cone, a Coca-Cola bottle, and even Heinz pickles. In the late 1920s, the statue was disassembled for inspection. During this time, children would often play around the disassembled statue. It was painted a flesh color and was reassembled in the early 1930s.

=== Atop Red Mountain ===
It was not until 1936 that the statue found a suitable home, thanks to the Works Progress Administration, which partially funded a new park in the city at the top of Red Mountain. A 126-foot (38.4 m) pedestal was built of local sandstone, and Vulcan was hoisted into place. A new spear was fabricated to be held high in his right hand while his left hand held a hammer at his side. Vulcan was repainted in an aluminum like finish. The statue's naked buttocks have been a source of humor for many years. A novelty song, "Moon Over Homewood," refers to the fact that the statue "moons" the neighboring suburb of Homewood, Alabama.

A nine-day festival commenced on May 7, 1939, to dedicate Vulcan Park. Evelyn Tully was crowned the Vulcan Queen. Guests of honor included the foundrymen who originally cast Vulcan. A crowd of 5,000 was present for the opening night of the festival.

In 1938 a challenge was sent out to hundreds of engineers and architects throughout the Southeast to design the base and park area. There were hundreds of submissions but a little known draftsman by the name of Carl Franklin Edins from Birmingham, Alabama was unanimously declared the winner.

To take full advantage of Vulcan's position overlooking Birmingham, the city's Junior Chamber of Commerce in 1946 made the statue into a symbol for road safety. His spear was replaced by a neon torch that glowed green, except during the 24 hours following a fatal traffic accident, when it glowed red. The spear was restored after the 1999–2004 restoration.

In 1949, Vulcan got new neighbors, when two television stations, WAFM-TV (now WVTM) and WBRC located their studios and towers on Red Mountain.

=== Centennial facelift ===
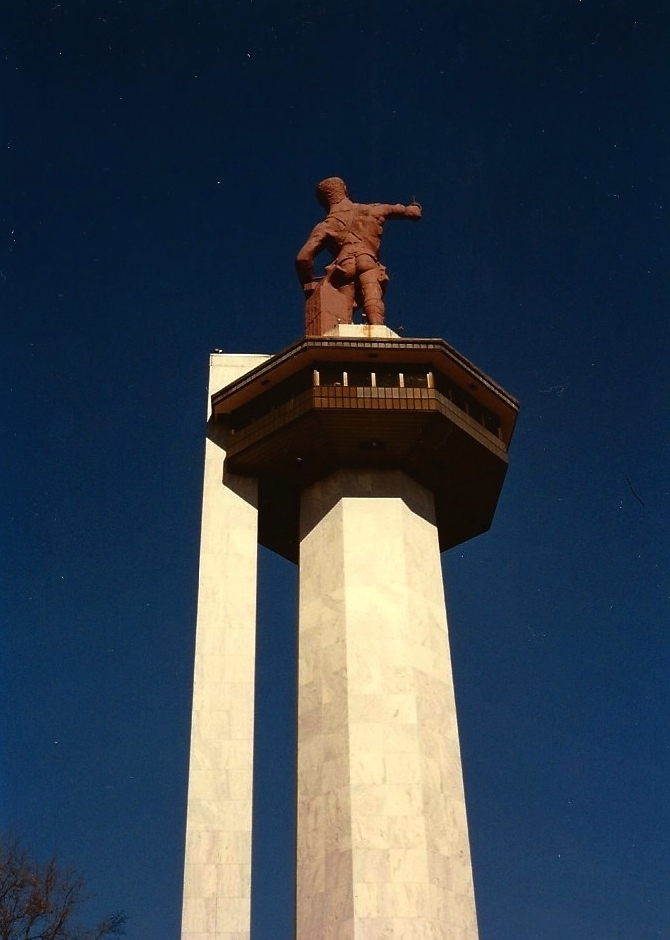
Photograph of Vulcan dated to January 1990. The photograph shows how the statue looked prior to the 1999–2004 restoration.

To celebrate Birmingham's centennial, the area around the statue was given a $1 million facelift in 1971. The original tower was clad in Alabama marble with an elevator and observation deck added. A covered walkway also connected a gift shop and snack bar. Vulcan was repainted a rust red a few years later. Vulcan was listed on the National Register of Historic Places on July 6, 1976.

Unfortunately, the statue itself had, when originally placed atop the pedestal, been filled up to the chest with concrete and had begun to deteriorate seriously due to different expansion and contraction rates of concrete versus cast iron. By 1990, an engineering study found that the statue was in danger of collapse.

=== 1999–2004 restoration ===
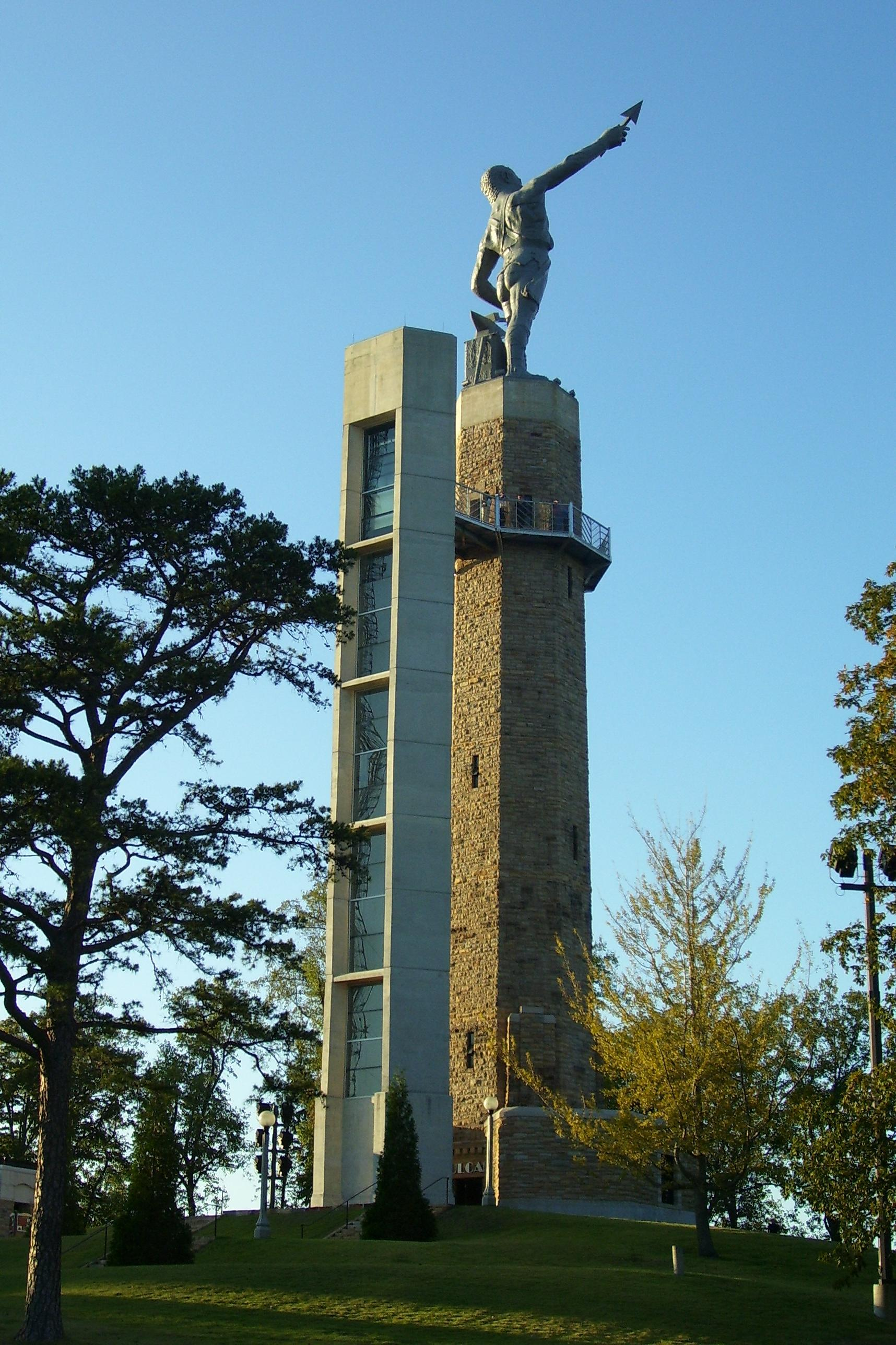
Vulcan on its restored pedestal with new elevator tower

Vulcan was removed during October and November 1999 in preparations for a $14 million renovation process that saw the park and pedestal restored to its original 1938 appearance. The statue sat in Vulcan Park's parking lot until the fall of 2001, when it was shipped to Robinson Iron to be repaired. The statue itself was thoroughly inspected and repaired, with some parts, including the lost spear point, re-cast. The new and restored pieces were thoroughly coated with a durable paint system, including a light-gray finish coat dubbed "Vulcan Gray" by the specifier.

Meanwhile, in 2002, the 1971 park additions were demolished, and scaffolding went up around Vulcan's tower. Workmen cleaned and repaired the original tower. Vulcan's head and right arm went on display at the Birmingham Museum of Art while the tower was prepared.

Vulcan was re-erected on a steel armature atop his tower during June 2003, restored to its original appearance as intended by Moretti, reoriented to the east. Television stations WVTM and WBRC both provided live webcams of the reinstallation.

Shortly after the statue was reinstalled, the scaffolding came down, and a new observation deck, providing panoramic views of the area, was installed. The museum at the base was rebuilt and a new elevator was installed, but oriented so it would not be easily seen from downtown Birmingham. The original waterfalls were not rebuilt, though the stone walkways leading from the parking lot directly to Vulcan's tower were restored. The statue and park were officially reopened in 2004, celebrating Vulcan's 100th birthday. In 2004, Vulcan Park welcomed more than 100,000 visitors who took in the statue's views of downtown Birmingham.

The restoration project received a National Preservation Honor Award from the National Trust for Historic Preservation in 2006.

== Vulcan Park and Museum ==
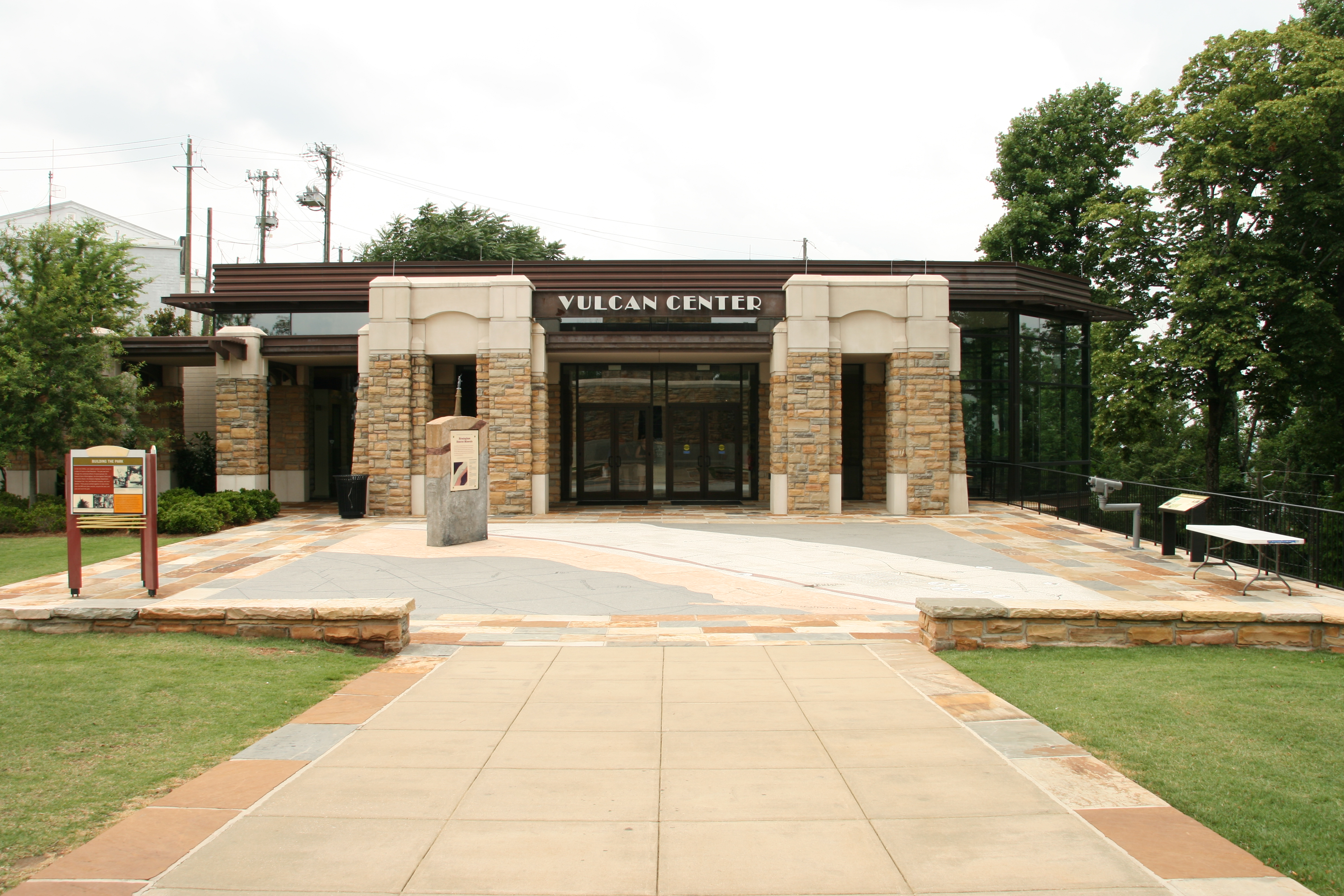
Vulcan Center at the top of Red Mountain

Vulcan Park and Museum (VPM) features views of Birmingham, an interactive history museum that examines Vulcan and Birmingham's story, and a 10-acre (4 ha) urban green space. In May 2007, Vulcan Park and Museum was designated an official Birmingham Information Center by the Greater Birmingham Convention and Visitors Bureau and offers information on transportation services, restaurants, events and other cultural offerings in Birmingham.

Vulcan Park and Museum is operated by Vulcan Park Foundation, a non-profit organization with a mission to preserve and promote Vulcan as the symbol for the Birmingham region, to advance knowledge and understanding of Birmingham's history and culture, and to encourage exploration of the region.

== See also ==
- Birmingham District
- List of statues
- List of tallest statues
- List of the tallest statues in the United States
- WVTM Channel 13 – local television station with call letter V for Vulcan
- An ode to Vulcan by Alabama poet Charles Ghigna was published by AL.com.
