= Tulsa State Fair =

Annual event in Tulsa, Oklahoma, US

- Genre: State fair
- Dates: 11 Days
- Location: Tulsa, OK
- Founded: 1903
- Attendance: 1,075,000 in 2023
- Website: http://www.tulsastatefair.com

The Tulsa State Fair is an annual event held at Expo Square in Tulsa, Oklahoma. The fair takes place in late September (usually on the fourth Tuesday after Labor Day, and occasionally in early October) and lasts 11 days.

== History ==
The event officially began in the late 1890s as a street fair. The Tulsa County Free Fair began in 1903 at the Western Association baseball park in downtown Tulsa, located at Archer Street and Boston Avenue. This event continued through the years until 1913, when the International Dry Farming Congress was established in Tulsa.

In 1913, with the enactment of the Oklahoma Free Fair Act and with Tulsa's ability to attract the International Dry Farming Congress, a 16 acres (6.5 ha) tract of land north of Archer Street and Lewis Avenue was purchased. It would be the home of the Tulsa State Fair for the next 13 years.

In 1923, the Tulsa Fairgrounds were moved to a 240-acre lot donated by Tulsa oilman J. E. Crosbie, located between Fifteenth and Twenty-first Streets in midtown Tulsa.

In 1926, it was decided that a group needed to be established in order to make decisions over the new location that is the present-day fairgrounds and Expo Square. The 1931 bond issue of $500,000 provided funds to construct the art deco-style Tulsa Fairgrounds Pavilion and make other necessary improvements, which led to the 1935 legislation that elevated the small local free fair to state fair status.

In 1949, the Tulsa State Fair merged with a spring livestock show to bring livestock events to the fair. In 1966, The International Petroleum Exposition (IPE) Center, now known as the SageNet Center, was built and made into a major part of the fair. During the 1970s, updates were made and year-round marketing began around the complex. It was at this time the fairgrounds were renamed to "Expo Square". Updates were made throughout the Pavilion, and a 13,000-seat grandstand was built.

The Tulsa County Public Facilities Authority has administered the fair since 1983. The authority consists of three Tulsa County commissioners and two at-large delegates. The Tulsa Police and Tulsa County Sheriff's Office, alongside security guards, have served as security.

Expo Square holds hundreds of events each year, with the Tulsa State Fair being one of the few events that it produces internally.

The fair was not held in 1917 or 1918 due to World War I, nor was it held from 1942 through 1945 due to World War II.

In 2020, the state fair's board of directors announced the cancellation of the 2020 fair due to the COVID-19 pandemic in Oklahoma. That year, the fair had only allowed junior livestock shows and certain vendors.

== Events and entertainment ==
Attractions at the Tulsa State Fair include thrill and kiddie rides on the Midway, agricultural exhibits located in the Built Ford Tough Livestock Complex, grounds entertainment, and educational exhibits.

The largest facility at the fairgrounds is the SageNet Center (formerly the River Spirit Expo, Exposition Center, and International Petroleum Exhibition Building). Inside, vendors and exhibit booths provide both educational and money-saving experiences.

== See also ==
- State fair
- Oklahoma State Fair
