= Golden Driller =

Statue in Tulsa, Oklahoma

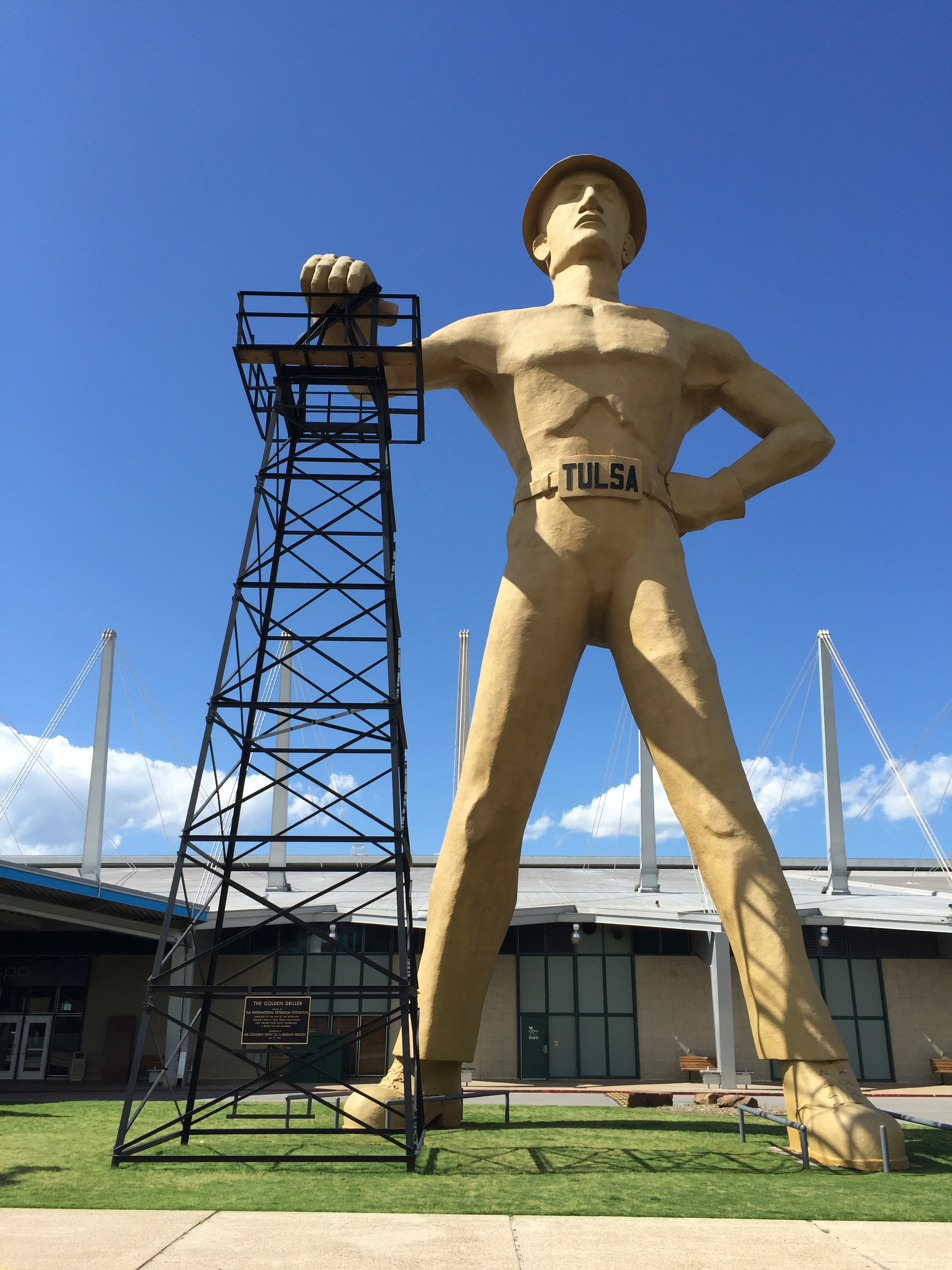
- Interactive map of Golden Driller
- Location: Tulsa, Oklahoma, United States
- Coordinates: 36.133638°N 95.931158°W
- Type: statue
- Height: 23 metres (75 ft)
- Completion date: 1953

The Golden Driller is a 76-foot-tall (23 m), 43,500-pound (19,700 kg) statue in Tulsa, Oklahoma, depicting an oil worker. The structure is a steel frame covered with concrete and plaster. It is the seventh-tallest statue in the United States and has been located in front of the Tulsa Expo Center since 1966.

== Overview ==
A version of the Golden Driller was originally built in 1952 by the Mid-Continent Supply Company of Fort Worth as a temporary feature of the International Petroleum Exposition. Six years later, one was erected again for the 1959 show. Due to the positive attention it attracted, the company donated the statue to the Tulsa County Fairgrounds Trust Authority which had it anatomically redesigned and permanently installed in front of the Tulsa Expo Center for the 1966 International Petroleum Exposition. The statue's right hand rests on an oil derrick which had been moved from a depleted oil field in Seminole, Oklahoma.

An inscription at the base of the statue reads: "The Golden Driller, a symbol of the International Petroleum Exposition. Dedicated to the men of the petroleum industry who by their vision and daring have created from God's abundance a better life for mankind."

In 1979, the Oklahoma Legislature adopted the Golden Driller as the state monument.

As part of an online promotional contest sponsored by Kimberly-Clark in October 2006, the Golden Driller was named the grand prize as a top ten "quirkiest destination" in the United States, winning its nominator a $90,000 international vacation for two.

His stats are said to include: Belt size - 48 ft in circumference, Shoe size- 393DDD, and Hat size - 112 hard hat. His belt originally read "MID-CONTINENT", but was changed in 1979 to the current buckle that says "TULSA".

== Branding ==
On May 20, 2020, as part of Tulsa's bid for Gigafactory 5 construction by Tesla, Inc., the original "Tulsa" on the statue's belt buckle was replaced by the word "Tesla," to create a caricature of Elon Musk. This was the first time wrap advertising had been applied to the driller's face.

== Homage ==
A free-fall drop ride in Fraispertuis City amusement park in France is named Golden Driller, and uses a smaller replica of the statue as part of the decor around the ride.

== See also ==
- Praying Hands
- List of tallest statues
- List of the tallest statues in the United States
