= Pegasus and Dragon =

Large metal statue in southern Florida

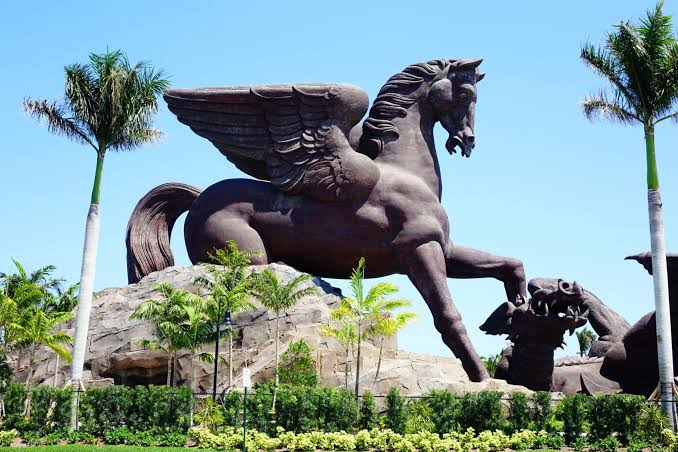
- Pegasus and Dragon in 2022
- Interactive map of Pegasus and Dragon
- Location: Hallandale Beach, Florida, United States
- Coordinates: 25.9823°N 80.1406°W
- Designer: Strassacker, Germany
- Type: Statue
- Material: Bronze, steel
- Length: 200 feet (61 m)
- Width: 115 feet (35 m)
- Height: 110 ft (34 m)
- Beginning date: April 5, 2013
- Completion date: December 6, 2014
- Opening date: 2016
- Dedicated to: Pegasus and Dragon

Pegasus and Dragon is a 110-foot (34 m) tall statue of Pegasus defeating a dragon in Gulfstream Park, Hallandale Beach, Florida. It is the third-tallest statue in the United States after the Birth of the New World in Puerto Rico and the Statue of Liberty in New York. It is also the world's largest and tallest equine and European dragon statue.

== Description ==
The Pegasus is poised with its front hoof on the neck of the dragon, which lies below the level of the equine. The statue complex is 200 feet (61 m) in length and 115 feet (35 m) in width. Pegasus is made of 330 tons of steel and 132 tons of bronze. The dragon is made of 110 tons of steel and 132 tons of bronze. Pegasus will feature a 5D dome theater in a rock formation underneath it. The dragon is surrounded by musical fountains. At night the statue is home to a fountain show featuring 13 musical pieces, 350 fog nozzles, 116 water nozzles, special LED lighting and the dragon breathing fire 20 feet during the show.

== Construction ==
The statue, based on the ideas of Frank Stronach (whose The Stronach Group owns Gulfstream Park), was announced in 2012 as part of a long-term expansion of Gulfstream Park that also included condominiums and more grandstands for the horse racing track. In 2013 further details emerged showing that Pegasus was to be in the pose of stomping on a dragon. The German bronze casting company Strassacker designed, planned and built the sculpture in cooperation with the engineering specialist Stark, the steel manufacturing company Wendeler and a Chinese bronze casting company, which was necessary to realize the high volume of bronze pieces. Construction on the site started on April 5 supervised by Strassacker and with Skanska overseeing construction. The statue was pre-cast and shipped in from China in 23 packing containers and the steel beams were shipped in 23 shipping containers from Germany after being made by Wendeler. The project cost $30 million. By December 6, 2014 construction of the statues was completed with work on the surrounding landscaping and water features remaining to be done in the summer of 2015. Work on lighting for the fountain show and dragon's fire breath began in late 2015. The complex opened in spring 2016.
