= History of Kilgore, Texas =

This article traces the history of Kilgore, Texas, United States.

== Indigenous period pre-European (-1500) ==
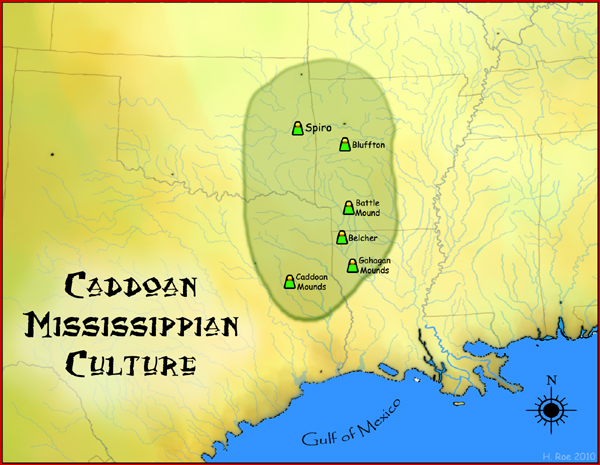
Map of the Caddoan Mississippian culture and some important sites

The Caddo are thought to be an extension of Woodland period peoples, the Fourche Maline and Mossy Grove cultures, whose members were living in the area of Arkansas, Louisiana, Oklahoma, and Texas areas between 200 BCE and 800 CE. The Wichita and Pawnee are also related to the Caddo, since both tribes historically spoke Caddoan languages.

By 800 CE, this society had begun to coalesce into the Caddoan Mississippian culture. Some villages began to gain prominence as ritual centers. Leaders directed the construction of major earthworks known as platform mounds, which served as temple mounds and platforms for residences of the elite. The flat-topped mounds were arranged around leveled, large, open plazas, which were usually kept swept clean and were often used for ceremonial occasions. As complex religious and social ideas developed, some people and family lineages gained prominence over others.

By 1000 CE, a society that is defined by modern archaeologists as "Caddoan" had emerged. By 1200, the many villages, hamlets, and farmsteads established throughout the Caddo world had developed extensive maize agriculture, producing a surplus that allowed for greater density of settlement. In these villages, artisans and craftsmen developed specialties. The artistic skills and earthwork mound-building of the Caddoan Mississippians flourished during the 12th and 13th centuries.

The Caddo were farmers and enjoyed good growing conditions most of the time. The Piney Woods, the geographic area where they lived, was affected by the Great Drought from 1276 to 1299 CE, which covered an area extending to present-day California and disrupted many Native American cultures.

== Territorial period (1500s–1872) ==
The Caddo inhabited the Kilgore area before it was settled by Europeans. All of Texas became part of the Spanish Viceroyalty of New Spain in the 16th century. The area was also claimed by the French, but in 1819 the Adams-Onís Treaty officially placed Kilgore well within Spanish territory by making the Red River the northern boundary of New Spain.

One European who probably visited the Kilgore area was Athanase de Mezieres in 1778 as he described an area similar to East Texas. De Mezieres, a Frenchman in the service of the King of Spain probably crossed the West Fork of the Trinity River into present-day East Texas. He wrote:

It is worthy to note that from the Brazos River on which the Tuacanas are established, and until one reaches the river which bathes the village of the Taovayzes (Red River), one sees on the right a forest that the natives appropriately call the Grand Forest. ...it is very dense, but not very wide. It seems to be there as a guide to even the most inexperienced, and to give refuge in this dangerous region to those who, few in number and lacking in courage, wish to go from one village to another. — De Mezieres

Present-day Kilgore remained under Spanish rule until 1821, when Mexico declared independence from Spain, and the area became part of the Mexican state of Coahuila y Tejas. The Republic of Texas broke off from Mexico in 1836 and remained an independent country for nearly 10 years.

This area was among early sections settled by United States immigrants before Texas became an independent republic, and after 1845, a state of the United States. It was an area developed as cotton plantations dependent on slave labor of African Americans. Lumbering of the pine forests was also pursued, especially in the early years of clearing the land for cultivation.

== Settlement (1872–1930) ==
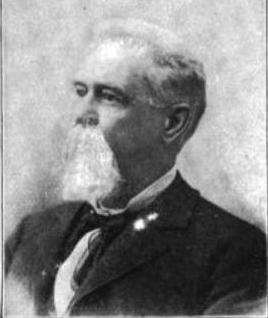
Constantine B. Kilgore

Kilgore was founded in 1872 when the International–Great Northern Railroad completed the initial phase of rail line between Palestine and Longview. The rail company chose to bypass New Danville, a small community about 10 miles (16 km) southeast of Longview, in lieu of a new townsite platted on 174 acres (0.70 km^{2}) sold to the railroad by Constantine Buckley Kilgore, the town's namesake. That way the railroad gained the profits from sale and development of these lands.

During this time Kilgore was only a local train farm depot, serving mostly as a central hub for the agricultural communities around it. Farmers relied on the trains to transport crops and livestock, linking Kilgore to larger markets beyond the local area. The town's economy and activity revolved around this simple depot function.

The new town received a post office in 1873 and, with a station and transportation for getting commodity crops to market, soon began to draw residents and businesses away from New Danville. By 1885, the population had reached 250, and the community had two cotton gins, a church, and a school (for white children only).

=== Lynching of Nick Adkins (1889) ===
On the night of February 7, 1889, a Black man named Nick Adkins was killed by a mob near Kilgore in what is documented as a racially motivated lynching. The mob, described as "White Caps", consisted of five or six men disguised in "women's clothing" and "sheets" with eyeholes cut out.

The perpetrators' target was a white schoolteacher named James Serins, who had taught at a local school for Black children for eight years and boarded at the home of Peter Strong, a local Black resident. The mob's intent was believed to be to either kill Serins or scare him out of the area. However, Serins was not at the house that night. When the mob attacked the home, Nick Adkins leapt from his bed in an attempt to escape and was "shot six times" and killed.

While a contemporary report in The Galveston Daily News stated it was "not known whether the mob was composed of white or colored men," the event is recognized as a case of white-on-black violence, typical of the era's racial tensions surrounding the education of African Americans.

=== The 1910's ===
The racially segregated Kilgore Independent School District was organized in 1910. By 1914 the town had two banks, several businesses, and a reported population of 700.

=== Red Summer (1919) ===
==== Lynching of "Shag" ====
On May 1, 1919, an African American man known only as "Shag" was lynched north of Kilgore. The circumstances remain unclear—no details about his full name, age, alleged crime, or manner of death were documented in contemporary records. This lynching is cataloged by the Lynching in Texas project (ID 857) as one of Texas's racial terror incidents.

==== Longview race riot ====
In June, local man Lemuel Walters of Longview had been whipped by two white men from Kilgore, allegedly for making "indecent advances" toward their sister. (One account said he was found in her bedroom.) Under Jim Crow, white men strictly monitored and discouraged relations between black men and white women, but not the reverse. Walters was arrested and put in jail in Longview. On June 17, he was abducted by a lynch mob consisting of ten men and subsequently shot to death later that night. His body was left near the railroad tracks. Dr. Davis, Jones, and some other respected black men went to Judge Bramlette in town, asking him to investigate the lynching. He asked for the names of people Jones had talked to at the jail. When no investigation was undertaken, the men returned to Judge Bramlette but became convinced he did not intend to pursue the case.

==== Disarmament ====
Two months after the murder of "Shag" and during the Longview Race Riot, on July 15, 1919, Texas Governor William P. Hobby ordered the disarmament of all Kilgore residents. National Guardsmen and Texas Rangers confiscated firearms from citizens, including Boy Scouts' small rifles, as reported in front-page news stories. Contemporary newspapers explicitly linked this operation to Shag's lynching and subsequent unrest in nearby Longview, where racial violence had erupted after a Black newspaper published an article about Shag's killing. The Dallas Morning News and San Antonio Express claimed the disarmament proceeded "quietly" and that Shag "had no sympathizers here, not even among the local negro population"—statements reflecting the racial biases of the era.

=== After 1919 ===
The 1920s showed continued steady growth, and by 1929 Kilgore was home to an estimated 1,000 residents.

== Oil period (1930–1945) ==
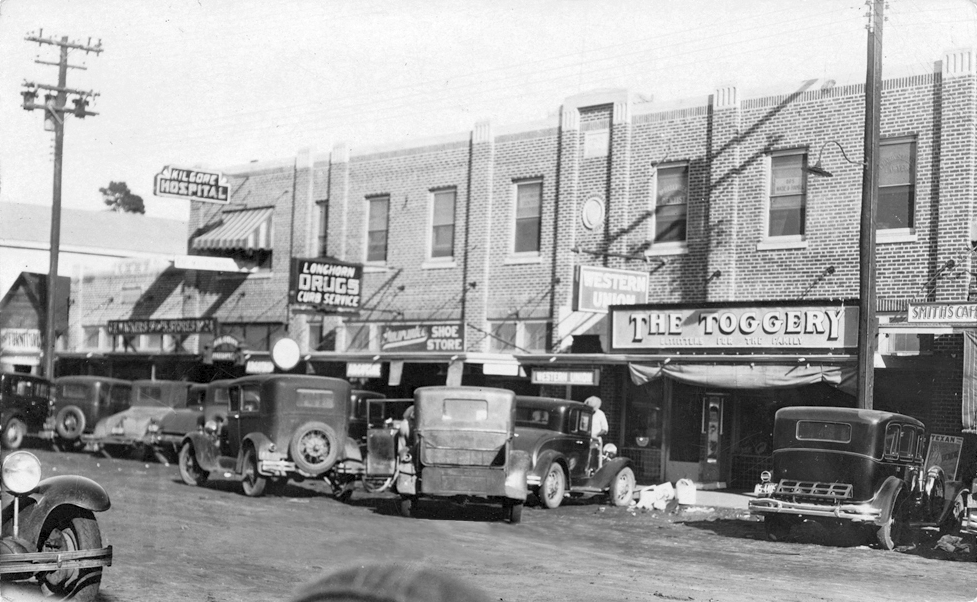
Kilgore's Downtown in 1930

Kilgore experienced growth after October 3, 1930, when wildcatter Columbus M. "Dad" Joiner struck oil near the neighboring town of Henderson.This well, known as the Daisy Bradford #3, marked the discovery of the vast East Texas Oil Field. Kilgore rapidly transformed from a small farming town on the decline into a bustling boomtown. The Daisy Bradford #3 was subsequently followed by the Lou Della Crim No. 1 and many others.

The discovery of oil soon drew a large influx of workers—known as "boomers"—to Kilgore, rapidly transforming the town into a tent city. Many newcomers lived in makeshift shelters such as piano crates or wooden boxes, with a significant number settling in an area known as "Happy Hollow" — a term also used in Houston to describe a similar red-light and low-income district. The city became known for vice and lawlessness that it was said that "Both sides of town were on the wrong side of the tracks". Eventually, the homeless broke the windows of the Presbyterian Church. When members arrived for service, they found people living inside. During the service, one man stood up and said, "Brother, we're going to stay". In the midst of this frenzy of events, an incendiary fire broke out in Kilgore believed to be arson, that destroyed the Baptist, Methodist, and Presbyterian churches. A rumor spread that angry oilfield workers, upset over losing their jobs due to a rationing order that closed too many wells, were responsible for starting the blaze. After the churches were burned by vandals, Kilgore became known as "the city without any churches." Louise's church, First Baptist, held services in homes and schools before building a location at "Happy Hollow" in 1933.

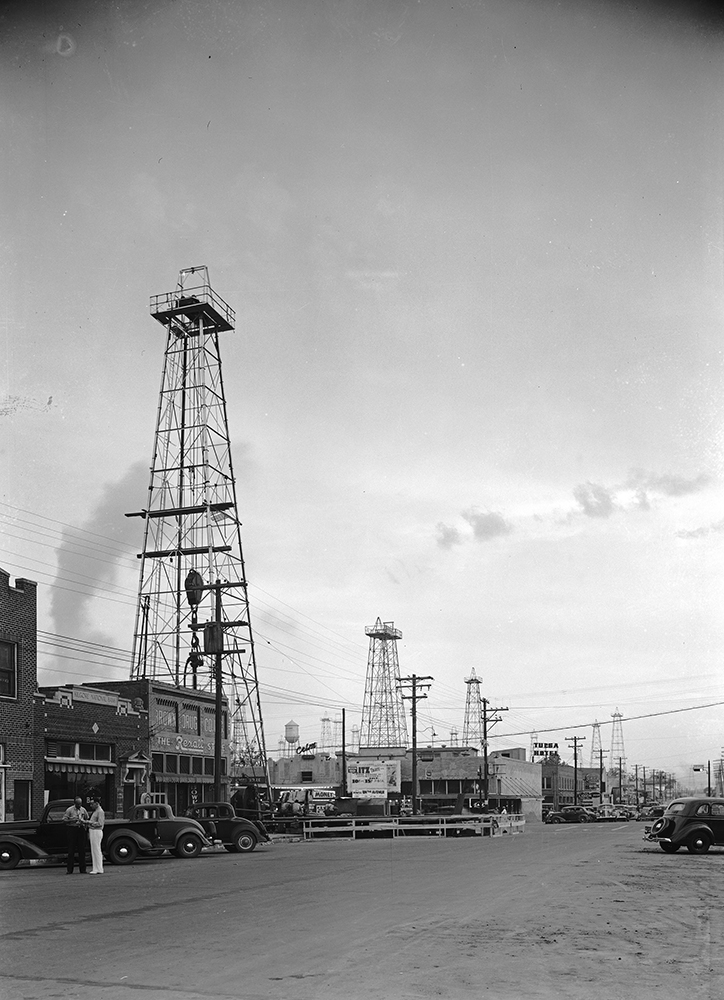
Kilgore's 1930s skyline

This rapid growth left most civic services overwhelmed, and as a result Kilgore was forced to incorporate in 1931 due to the crime, and unsafe conditions. With Malcolm Crim (part of an extremely influential family that at this point owned multiple buildings downtown such as the Crim office building, Crim Theater, a bank, and more) becoming the first mayor of Kilgore and with the city flooded with male workers and roustabouts, law enforcement struggled to keep order among the shanties, tents, and ramshackle honky-tonks that crowded Kilgore's main streets. On one occasion, they had to summon help from the Texas Rangers to keep the peace.

=== Juke joints and the blues scene ===
Among the musicians who shaped this scene was the, African-American singer and guitarist Andrew "Smokey" Hogg. Born in nearby, in 1914, Hogg spent his early career in the 1930s traveling throughout East Texas with his partner, the slide guitarist. Multiple sources document that Kilgore was a regular stop on their performance circuit, which also included Tyler, Greenville, and Palestine. The duo played in the juke joints and dance halls that catered to workers from the region's oilfields and lumber camps, years before Hogg achieved national recognition with hit records in the late 1940s.

Oil production continued throughout the early 1930s, with more than 1,100 producing oil wells within city limits at the height of the boom.

=== Sinclair oilfield fire ===
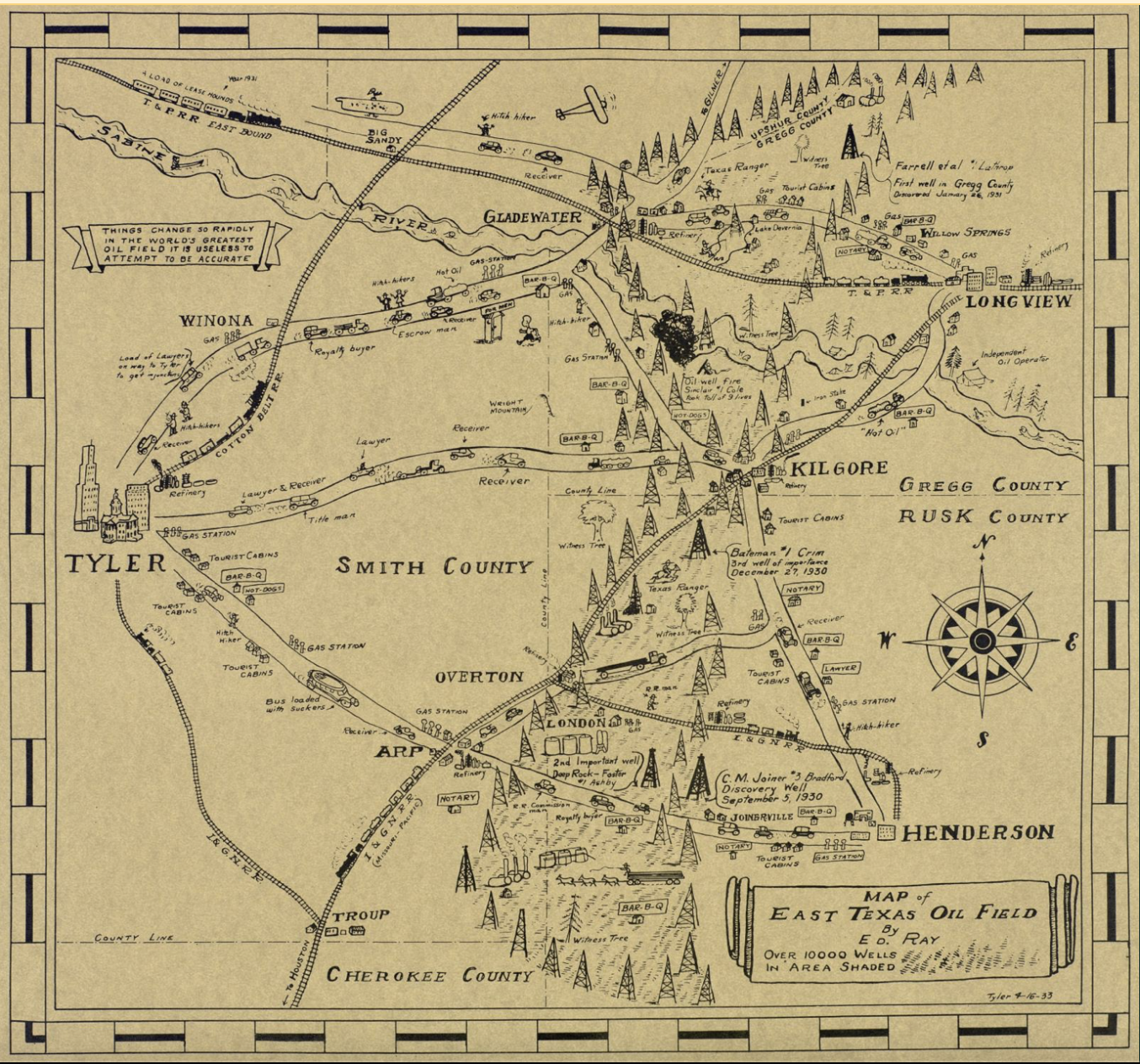
1933 map showing the location of the Sinclair oilfield fire just above Kilgore

The Sinclair oilfield fire broke out on April 28, 1931, at Sinclair Oil Company's No. 1 “Cole” wildcat well in an oilfield just north of Kilgore's Downtown

The blowout occurred when high-pressure oil and gas surged up the derrick and ignited, likely from sparks caused by metal tools striking on the rig floor. Flames shot as high as 300 feet, and dense smoke could be seen for miles around.

Efforts to quench the blaze began almost immediately, with crews in asbestos suits preparing a nitroglycerine blast under the direction of famed wild‑well tamer M. M. Kinley and his brother Harry Kinley. After approximately thirty hours, the explosive charge successfully cut off the fuel supply and the fire was extinguished.

Nine men lost their lives when their clothing ignited or in attempts to reach safety; survivors recounted that two men who dove into a slush pit nearby were fatally scalded. The disaster prompted the Texas Railroad Commission and private operators to adopt more rigorous blowout‑prevention equipment, safety protocols, and dedicated firefighting teams in the East Texas Oil Field.

=== Bonnie & Clyde ===
Kilgore played a notable role in the manhunt for notorious outlaws Bonnie and Clyde through the involvement of Texas Ranger and Kilgore Police Chief Bob Goss, who arrested Clyde Barrow. Key events include:

==== Clyde Barrow's 1934 Arrest and Local Connections ====
- On February 6, 1934, the Kilgore News Herald reported Goss and Dallas detective Will Fritz had arrested and captured Clyde Barrow months earlier.
- That same edition featured the headline "BARROW, BONNIE SEEN IN E. TEX." - indicating their continued presence months before their deaths.
- Former Kilgore News Herald Reporter Bob Cone described Barrow as an "elusive, even phantom-like desperado," quoting Goss's assessment:
  "Barrow is bad. Barrow is bold... He's much more desperate today than when launching his career of crime." - Police Chief Bob Goss (Texas Ranger)

==== Escalation and Final Days ====
- When asked if Barrow would resist arrest violently, Goss stated:
  "Yes. He's desperate. He knows it will be too bad for him if captured." - Police Chief Bob Goss (Texas Ranger)
- The duo maintained Gregg County connections through Bonnie Parker's sister Billie Mace, who worked at a Gladewater café.
- Their flight to Louisiana (where ambushed on May 23, 1934) followed a failed stakeout near Quitman after associate J.A. Nichols' arrest in Longview.

==== Aftermath ====
- Goss continued serving Kilgore until 1936, later becoming a Texas Ranger sergeant.
- Historical analysis confirms the Longview events had "direct and strong bearing" on the Louisiana ambush.

=== Kilgore College ===
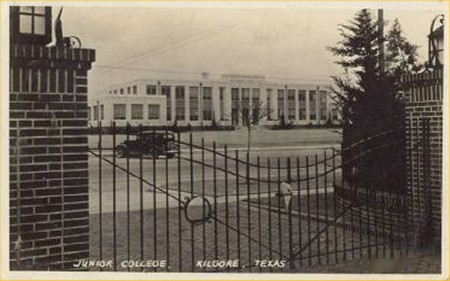
Old Main at Kilgore College 1930

The East Texas oil boom that started near Kilgore in late 1930 generated large amounts of revenue that made it possible to establish a community college. W.L. Dodson, superintendent of the local Kilgore school district, brought B. E. Masters, then president of Amarillo Junior College, to Kilgore in the spring of 1935 to assist in creating the college. The college was established in August of that year, with Dodson named as the first president, and Masters as the first dean. College classes began that fall with 11 faculty members and 229 students temporarily using the Kilgore public school facilities.

By 1936, the population had increased to more than 12,000, and Kilgore's skyline was crowded with oil derricks.

==== Rangerettes ====
The Kilgore College Rangerettes were founded by Gussie Nell Davis, a physical education instructor from Farmersville, Texas who had previously taken an all-girl's group called the "Flaming Flashes" from being a simple high school pep-squad to an elaborately performing drum and bugle corps in Greenville, Texas. In 1939, Davis was hired away from Greenville High School by the Kilgore College Dean, Dr. B.E. Masters. Masters wanted something different than the traditional women's drum and bugle corps. He wanted something that would increase female enrollment at the college but would also keep fans in their seats during football half time shows instead of drinking alcohol under the stands. Opting early to forgo the use of musical instruments, Davis focused her new team on dance and choreography, later naming the group the Rangerettes. The Rangerettes became a success early on despite criticisms of their uniforms featuring skirts above the knee, which by the 1960s had become much shorter. Davis served as the group's director for thirty-nine years, until June 1979.

There is disagreement within the Rangerette alumni group and others in the dance team industry regarding the date of the first Rangerette performance. Several sources have it as September 12, 1940, but in an oral interview with Texas State University history professor Dan K. Utley, Davis confirmed the first performance date as September 19, 1940, as does the book, A History of Kilgore College, 1935-1981.

=== Tyler vs Kilgore tensions during the oil boom ===
During the East Texas Oil Boom of the 1930s, significant tensions arose between Kilgore and Tyler, particularly over the allocation of oil revenues and mineral rights. As oil was discovered in Kilgore, both cities vied for economic dominance in the region, with Kilgore emerging as a center of oil production while Tyler, being larger and more established, exerted political and legal leverage. Disputes over royalties and taxes often led to legal battles, and many Kilgore residents believed that Tyler's legal maneuvers and favorable agreements allowed it to benefit disproportionately from oil revenues that should have rightfully gone to Kilgore. This perception of unfairness was exacerbated by issues related to land ownership and annexation, leading to a lasting sentiment in Kilgore that Tyler effectively took its oil money, hindering Kilgore's potential for growth during and after the boom.

=== Kilgore Public Library (1933-1939) ===
Based on the style of Normandy cottages, construction of the Kilgore Public Library began in 1933 and was completed in 1939. The New Deal agencies, the Public Works Administration and Works Progress Administration of the President Franklin D. Roosevelt administration, participated in the construction.

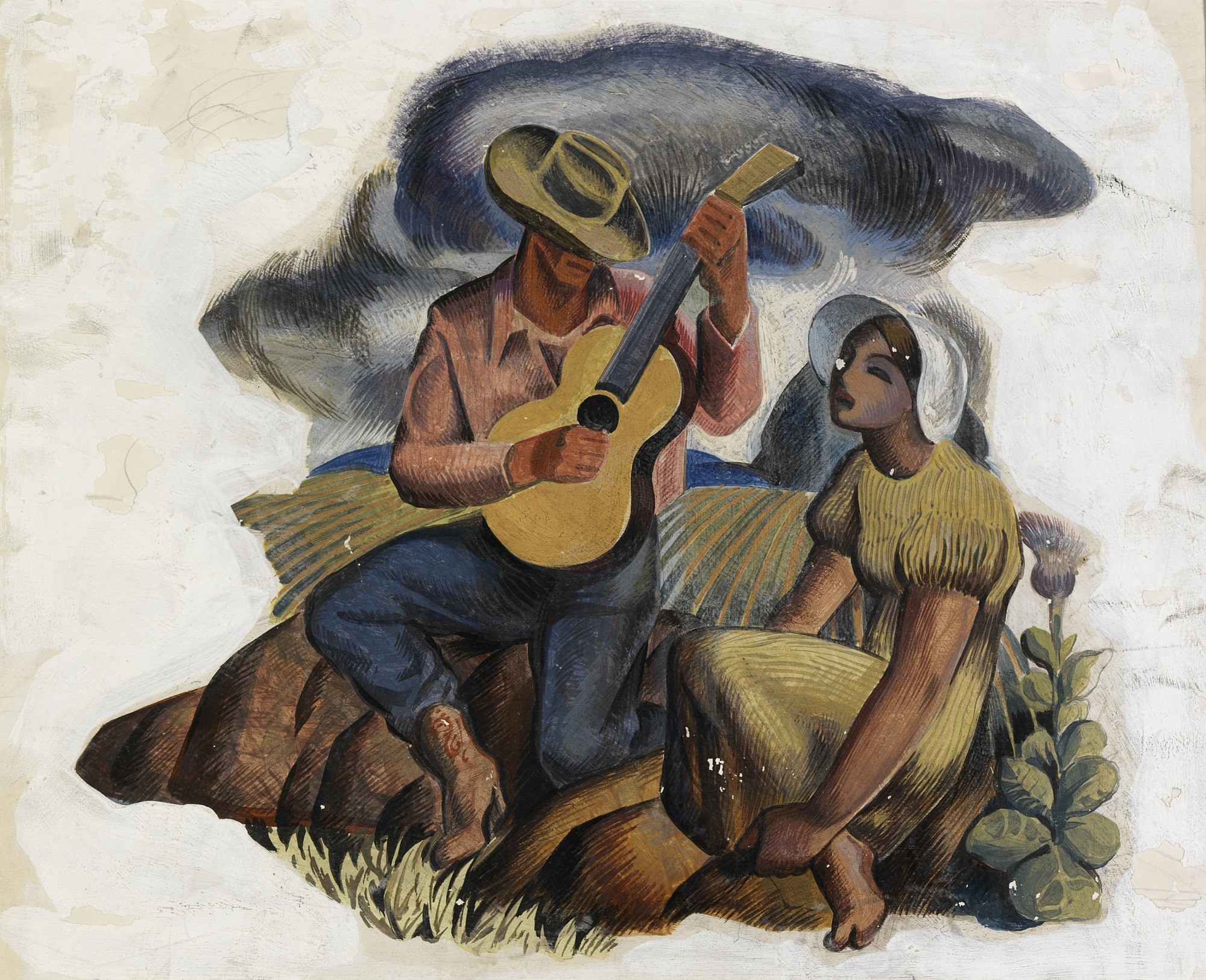
“Music of the Plains” (mural study, Kilgore, Texas Post Office, 1939). This New Deal-era artwork features a cowboy of Mexican heritage serenading a woman, symbolizing the deep Hispanic cultural roots in Kilgore's identity. The original study is housed in the Smithsonian American Art Museum.

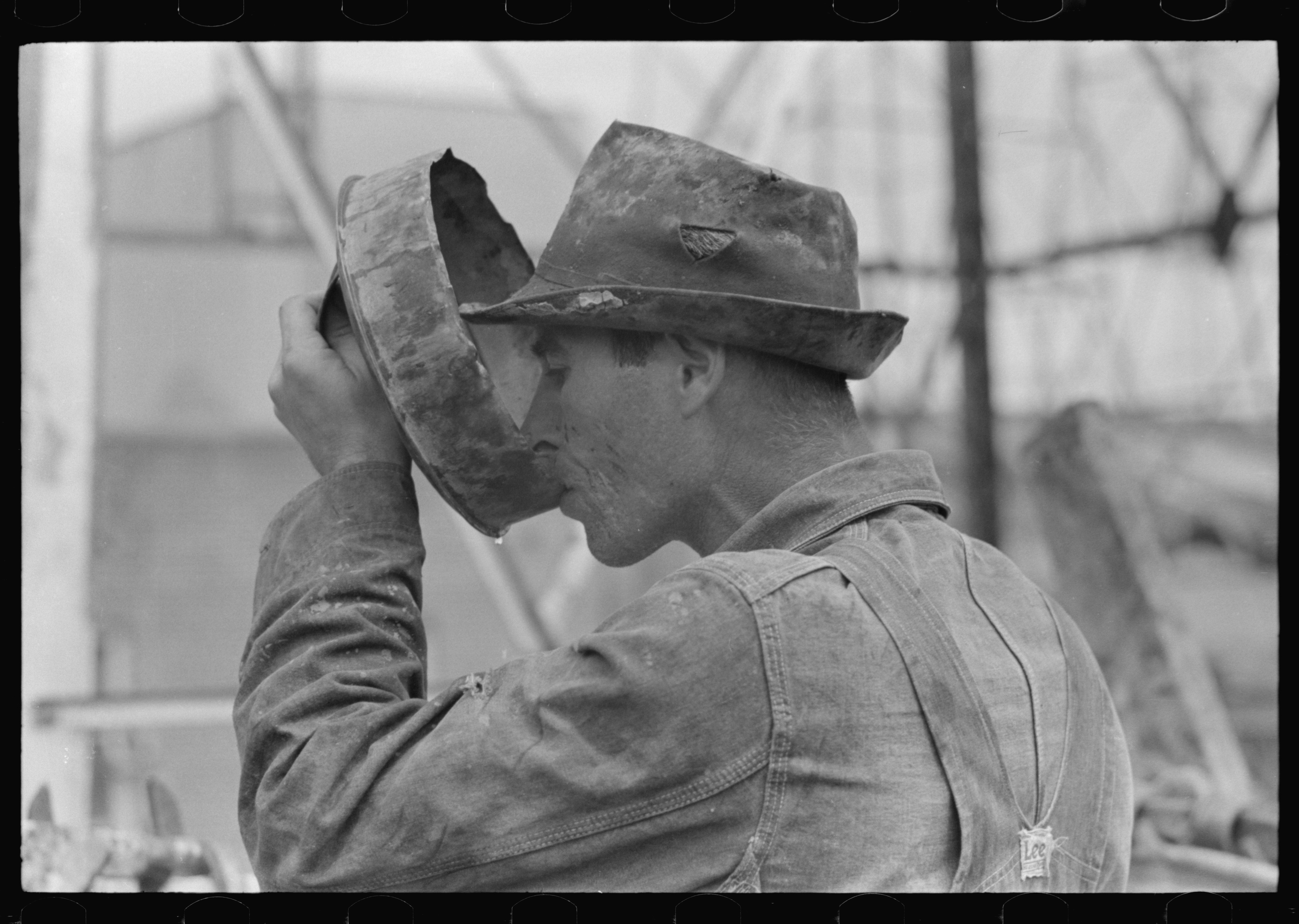
A Lone Driller's Water Break drinking from a battered pan during the Texas Oil Boom in Kilgore, Texas, 1939 — a snapshot of boomtown grit and improvisation.

=== Developmental impact on Dallas ===
Kilgore has played a significant role in the development of Dallas, particularly during the early 20th century, through its contributions to the East Texas oil boom. In the early 1930s, oil was discovered in Kilgore, leading to a massive oil rush that transformed the region's economy. This discovery not only spurred economic growth in Kilgore but also had a profound impact on Dallas, which served as a central hub for the oil industry.

Dallas became a key center for oil-related businesses, including drilling companies, refineries, and financial institutions, many of which were established to support the burgeoning oil industry in East Texas. The wealth generated from the oil boom facilitated significant investments in infrastructure, real estate, and commerce in Dallas, contributing to its rapid urbanization and economic diversification during that period.

Additionally, the oil boom led to the establishment of numerous oil companies and financial institutions in Dallas, further solidifying its status as a major economic center in the region. The prosperity of the oil industry in East Texas, with Kilgore at its heart, thus played a pivotal role in shaping the economic landscape of Dallas in the early 20th century.

The Kilgore Gushers were a Minor League Baseball team that played in the East Texas League in 1931. The team was the first known professional team to be based in Kilgore. It was managed by Turkey Gross.

By the mid-1930s the oil boom had begun to subside, and most of the small oil companies and wildcatters had sold out to major corporations. The boom was essentially over by 1940. But oil production has remained central to the city's economy. The population, which fluctuated wildly throughout the 1930s, stabilized at around 10,000

=== World War II ===
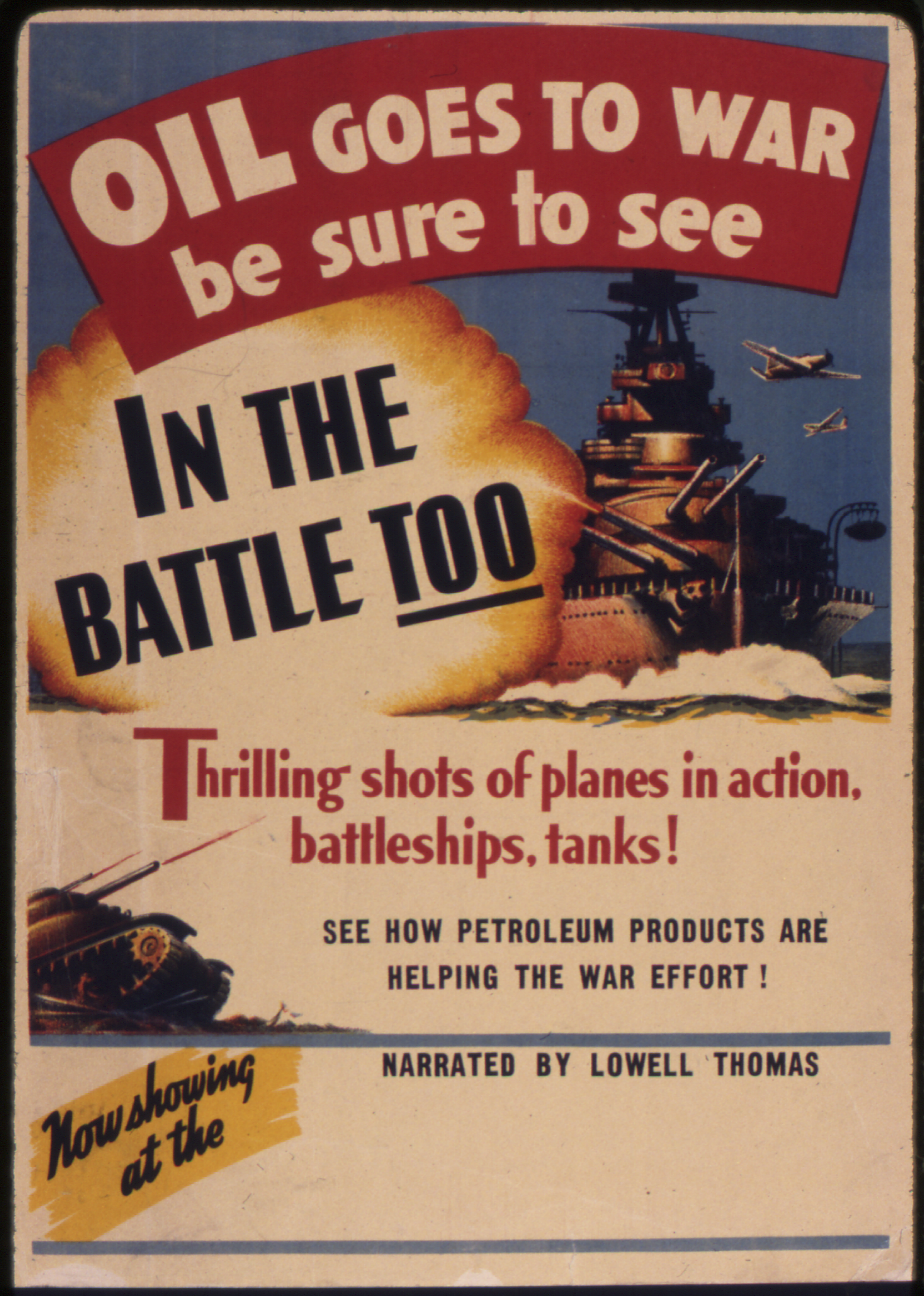
Poster advertising the importance of oil to the United States war effort

During World War II, Kilgore played a notable role due to its strategic significance in the oil industry. The East Texas Oil Field, discovered in 1930 just a decade ago at this point, became crucial for supplying oil, which was vital for military operations. This led to Kilgore's rapid growth as it became one of the most significant oil-producing areas in the country, contributing to the Allied war effort by providing a reliable fuel source for vehicles and machinery

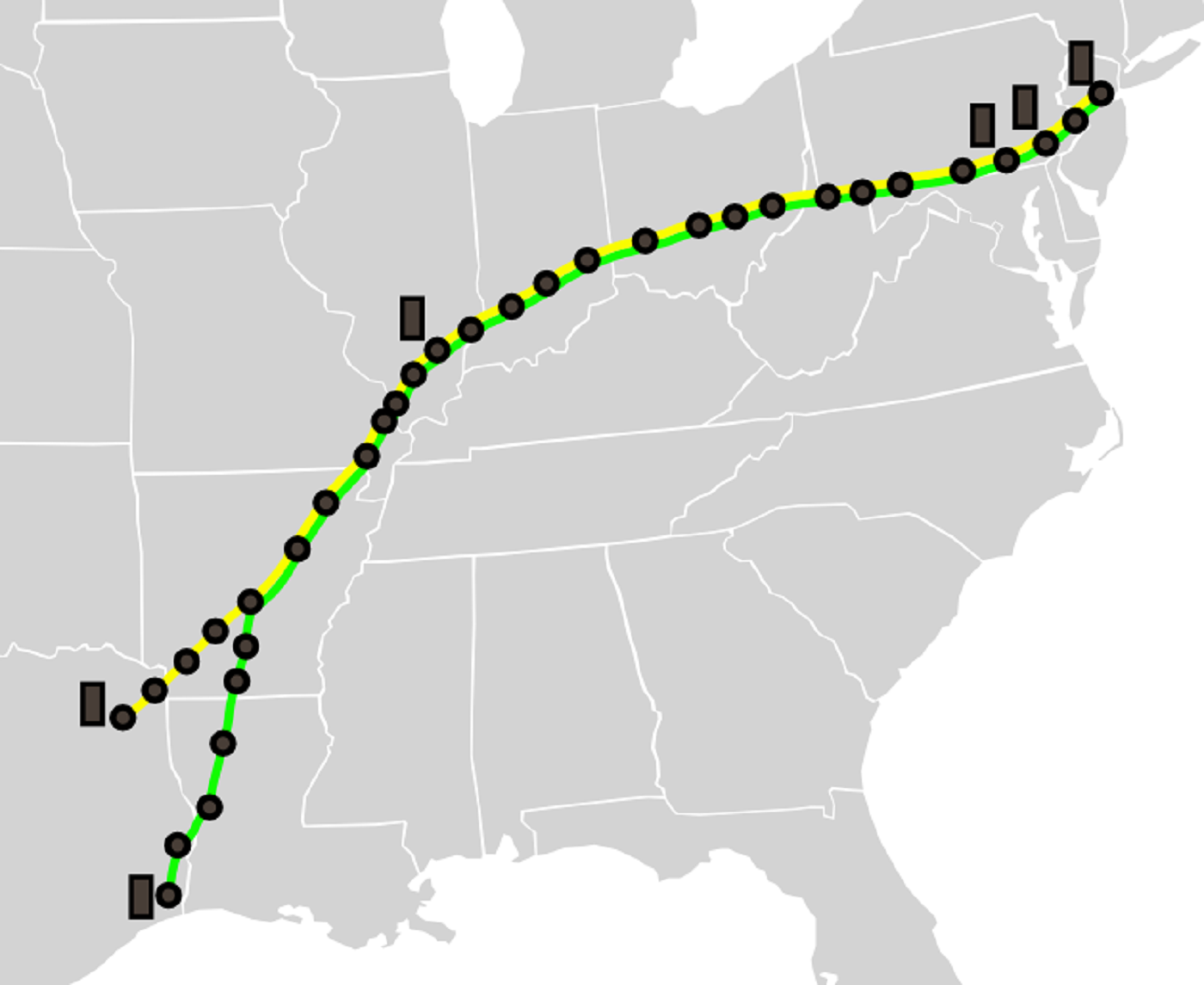
"Big Inch" Pipeline supplying oil to the Nation bypassing German U-Boats

"Big Inch" Pipeline - Inches towards Kilgore: Built between 1942 and 1944, it transported 300,000 barrels from the Kilgore oil fields per day to East Coast refineries, bypassing German U-boat attacks on tankers.

Additionally, the city hosted various military training and support operations, reflecting the nationwide efforts to mobilize resources for the war.

Like Camp Fannin, established in 1943 just outside Kilgore, became one of the largest infantry training centers during World War II. It trained over 200,000 soldiers who frequently traveled to Kilgore and surrounding towns for entertainment, impacting local businesses, culture, and infrastructure. After the war, Camp Fannin was closed, but its influence lingered in Kilgore, where new roads and buildings accommodated the town's growth. Today, many Kilgore residents have connections to veterans who passed through the camp, adding to the town's historical identity.

Kilgore's booming oil industry not only shaped its economy during the war but also influenced its post-war development

== Mid-century (1946-1974) ==
=== Post-War ===
The Kilgore Drillers was a professional baseball team that existed briefly for four seasons from 1947 to 1950, playing the first two seasons in the Lone Star League and the last two in the East Texas League. The Drillers were successful in their years in the Lone Star League and the East Texas League.

The Kilgore Rangers, and Kilgore Braves were also all professional baseball teams that played in Kilgore during the 1940s-1950s. These baseball teams were most likely formed from the veterans coming back from World War II

=== Cold War ===
==== Van Cliburn ====
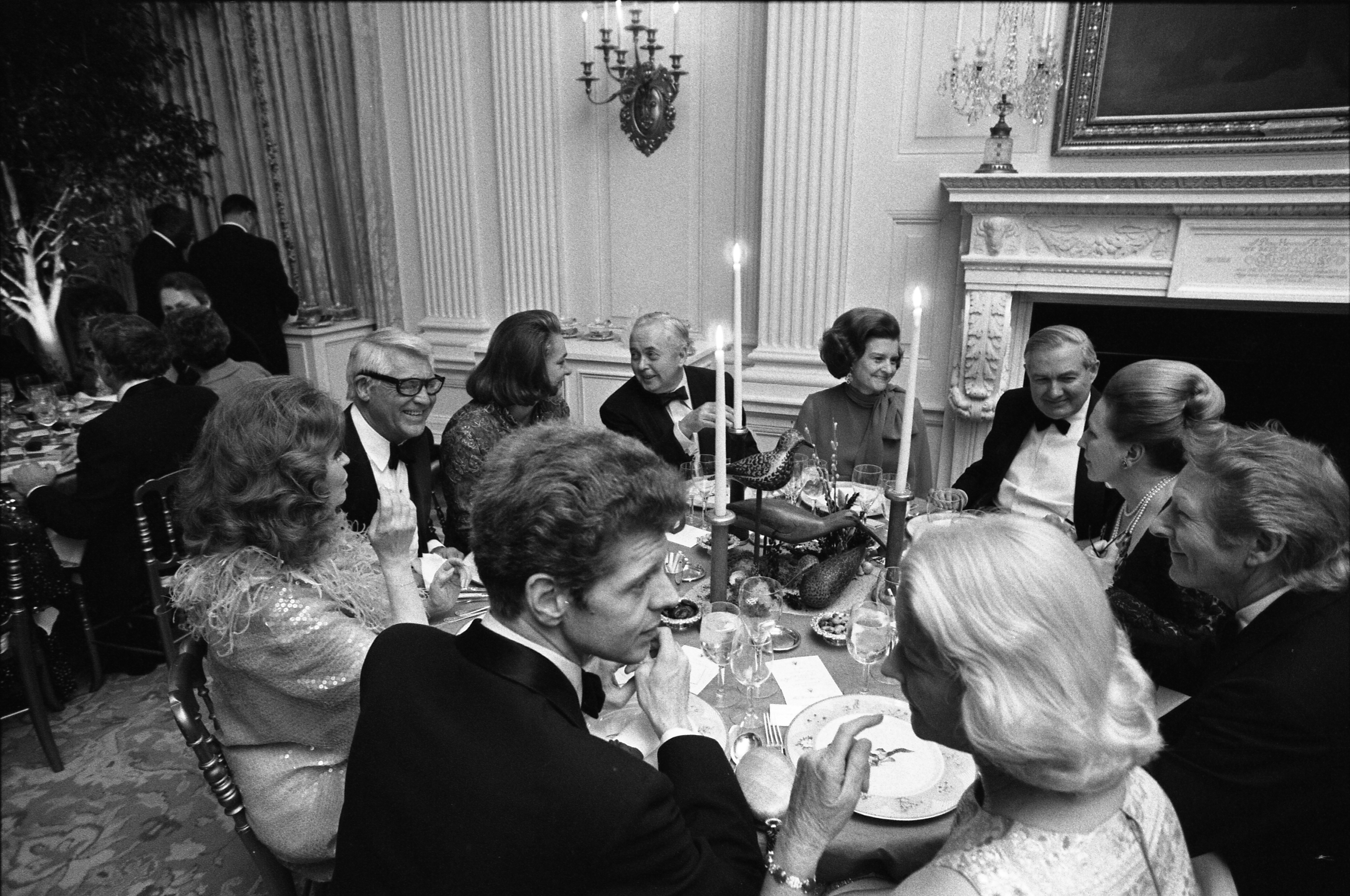
Photograph of First Lady Betty Ford, Prime Minister Harold Wilson of Great Britain, Happy Rockefeller, Cary Grant, Eileen Mehle, Van Cliburn, Mrs. Winston Guest, Danny Kaye, Margaret Truman Daniel, and British Secretary of State James Callaghan Seated in the State Dining Room during a State Dinner Honoring Prime Minister Wilson

Van Cliburn, an accomplished pianist from Kilgore, captured international attention in April 1958 when he won the prestigious Tchaikovsky International Piano Competition in Moscow, becoming the first American to do so. This win was significant due to Cold War tensions between the U.S. and the Soviet Union. Though he had graduated from Kilgore High School, by this time Cliburn had left Kilgore and was studying and performing on a national scale. His journey to Moscow was funded by American organizations, yet his profound talent and unassuming charm earned him popularity among Soviet audiences and even the support of Soviet Premier Nikita Khrushchev, who famously permitted Cliburn to win on merit, overriding any political considerations.

This cultural victory became a symbol of goodwill between the superpowers. Cliburn received a hero's welcome upon return to the U.S., including a ticker-tape parade in New York—the first ever for a classical musician. This achievement highlighted Kilgore's cultural significance as his hometown.

== 1974-Today ==
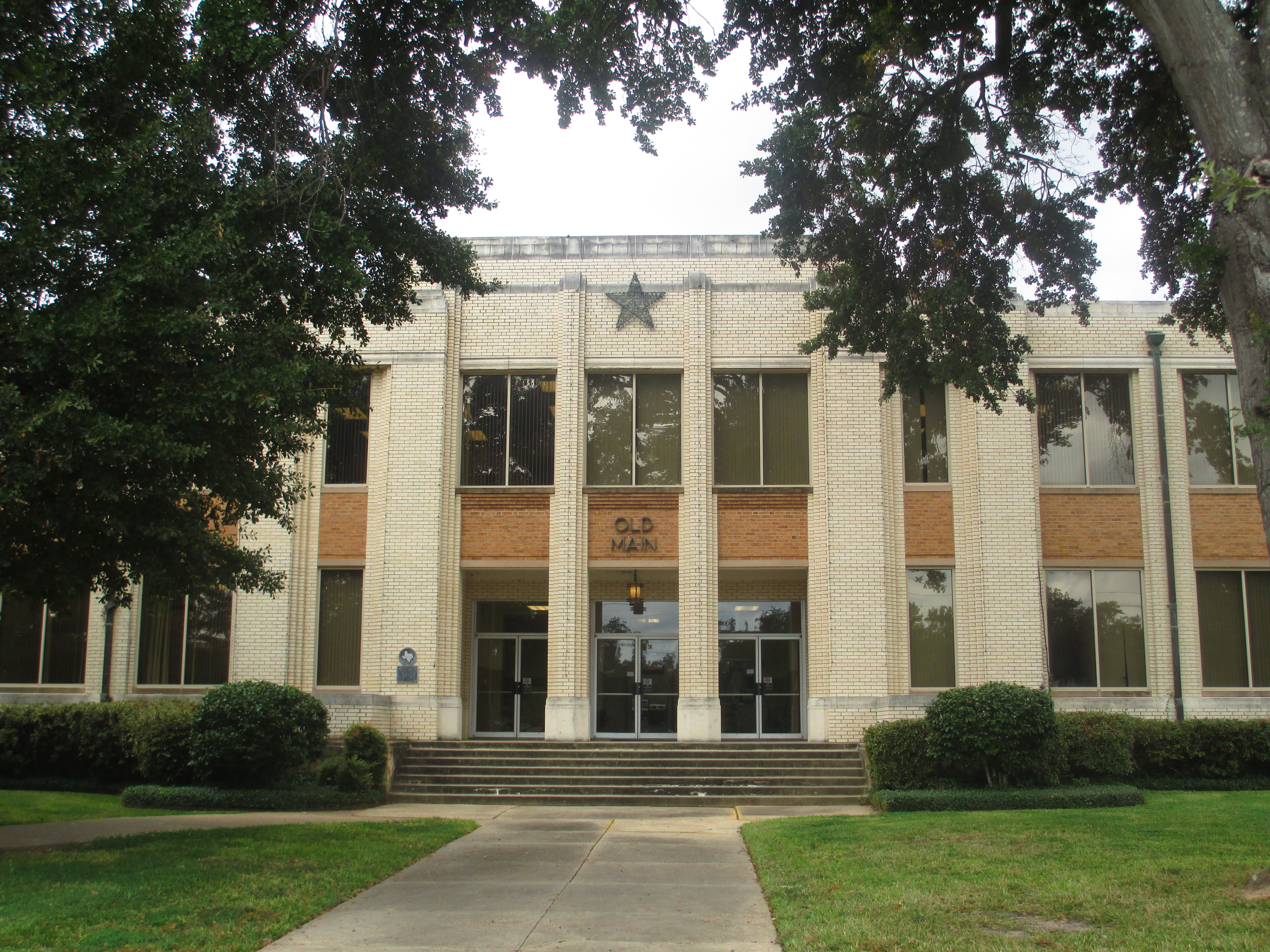
Old Main at Kilgore College

On September 23, 1983, five men and women were abducted from a Kentucky Fried Chicken restaurant in Kilgore and found slain, execution-style, in an oilfield outside of town. The crime went unsolved until November 2005, when two men, already in prison for other crimes, were charged, tried, and convicted for the crime.

On December 13, 2011, the City of Kilgore annexed Fredonia.

A 2015 estimate placed it at just under 15,000 residents.

== Bibliography ==
- Durham, Kenneth R. Jr (1980). "The Longview Race Riot of 1919". East Texas Historical Association. 18 (2, Article 6). ISSN 0424-1444.
- Durham, Ken (June 15, 2010). "Longview race riot of 1919". Handbook of Texas Online, Texas State Historical Association.
- Tuttle, William M. Jr. (1970). Race Riot: Chicago in the Red Summer of 1919. University of Illinois Press. ISBN 9780252065866.
- Tuttle, William M. Jr. (1972). "Violence in a "Heathen" Land: The Longview Race Riot of 1919". Phylon. 33 (4). Clark Atlanta University: 324–333. doi:10.2307/273678. ISSN 0031-8906. JSTOR 273678.

=== Further viewing ===
- A Video at the Texas Archive of the Great Sinclair Fire of 1931
