= Lon Oden =

Texas Ranger (1863–1910)

Alonzo Van Oden
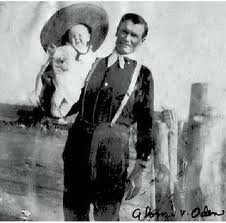
- Alonzo with his daughter Mamie around 1904-1910
- Born: 15 March 1863; Tilden, Texas
- Died: 11 August 1910 (aged 47); El Paso, Texas
- Other names: Lon Oden

Alonzo Van Oden (15 March 1863 – 11 August 1910) was a Texas Ranger, businessman, and rancher.

== Early life ==
Alonzo "Lon" Van Oden was born in Tilden, Texas to Aaron Van Buren Oden and Mary Jane Walker Oden. His father, of Swedish descent, had served as a Texas Ranger. Four months after Oden's birth, his father and rancher George Hindis encountered Julian Gonzales, a horse thief from Starr County, Texas. In the ensuing gunfight, both men were killed. Hindis, lacking proper tools, buried Aaron Oden at the site of the shooting and then informed Oden's 19-year-old wife of her husband's death. Mary Jane Oden died on August 31, 1864, a year after her husband. Her father, Joe, recorded in his journal that she died of a broken heart.

His grandparents subsequently raised Oden, with both the Walker and Oden families sharing the responsibility. His grandmother educated him in Swedish classics, poetry, and the arts. The Walker family taught him shooting and survival skills. His grandfather, Joe Walker, had nineteen children. As Oden became an orphan at the age of 1, Joe Walker took a special interest in the child and his upbringing, gifting him 150 head of cattle when Oden was 2 years old, registering them with the "ODN" brand.

Oden learned the cattle trade from his uncles, Tom and James. During this time, he often witnessed his family's battles against raiding Comanches who would raid the ranch for horses or cattle. On Christmas Eve 1868, his cousin William "Buck" Taylor was killed in a shooting attributed by some as the start of the Sutton–Taylor feud.

== Texas Ranger career ==
Oden married for the first time in 1889, but the marriage ended in divorce shortly after. On March 1, 1891, he joined the Texas Rangers. He initially worked in the region surrounding San Antonio but was later sent west to serve with Ranger John R. Hughes. Oden and Hughes were dispatched to Shafter because the Carrasco brothers' gang, led by Antonio Carrasco, was committing armed robberies to steal silver being shipped from the silver mines. Assisted by Ranger and undercover agent Ernest St. Leon, the Rangers surveilled a mine expected to be targeted based on inside information obtained by St. Leon. When the outlaws opened fire after refusing to surrender, the Rangers killed all three men.

Oden was then sent to El Paso, where he worked for some time and became acquainted with Ranger Bass Outlaw. In 1893, after Ranger Captain Frank Jones was ambushed and killed, John Hughes took over as Ranger Captain for that area. Because Jones and his small band of Rangers were in Mexico when ambushed, no one was prosecuted for Jones' death. However, Ernest St. Leon, still undercover, supplied Captain Jones with a list of names of those known to have participated in the killing. A company of Rangers, including Oden, led by Hughes, tracked down and killed all 18 men on the list, either by shooting or hanging them.

Oden settled in Ysleta, Texas, during this time. He participated in several Ranger raids, and he and his fellow Rangers drastically reduced the number of robberies and instances of cattle rustling in that region. On April 5, 1894, Bass Outlaw was shot and killed by John Selman in El Paso. Outlaw, intoxicated and furious at what he perceived as mistreatment by a local judge, had shot and killed Ranger Joe McKidrict inside a brothel. When confronted by Selman, a constable at the time, Outlaw and Selman engaged in a gunfight, which left Selman wounded and Outlaw dead. Two years later, on April 5, 1896, a lawman and friend to Outlaw, George Scarborough, shot and killed Selman in a gunfight stemming from Selman's killing of Outlaw.

Oden continued working as a Ranger and developed a reputation for his involvement in numerous encounters with outlaws and cattle rustlers, which often resulted in deaths, arrests, or hangings. Around 1894, he became involved with widow Annie Laura Hay and on January 17, 1897, the couple married. He then left the Rangers soon after to become a rancher and businessman, starting a successful ranch in Marfa, Texas. He died on August 11, 1910, from an unspecified lung ailment. In 1936, his daughter, Annie Laura Oden Jensen, published his diary, documenting his experiences as a Ranger.
