= Longview race riot =

Race riot and lynching in Texas, US

- Part of Red Summer
- Date: July 10–12, 1919
- Location: Longview, Texas, United States
- Also known as: Longview Race Riot of 1919
- Type: Race riot
- Deaths: 1

The Longview race riot was a series of violent incidents in Longview, Texas, between July 10 and July 12, 1919, when whites attacked black areas of town, killed one black man, and burned down several properties, including the houses of a black teacher and a doctor. It was one of the many race riots in 1919 in the United States during what became known as Red Summer, a period after World War I known for numerous riots occurring mostly in urban areas.

The riot ended after local and state officials took actions to impose military authority and quell further violence. After ignoring early rumors of planned unrest, local officials appealed to the governor for forces to quell the violence. In a short time, the Texas National Guard and Texas Rangers sent forces to the town, where the Guard organized an occupation and curfew. Some men were shot and numerous black homes and businesses were burned prior to the arrival of the law enforcement and military units. One black man was shot and killed by armed whites before the National Guard occupied the town. No one was prosecuted for the events, although numerous whites and blacks were arrested. The black suspects were taken to Austin for their safety; half were advised against ever returning to Longview.

== Background ==
Longview is located approximately 125 miles east of Dallas in northeast Texas. In 1919 it had a population of 5,700, of which 1,790, or thirty-one percent, were African American. It was an area of historic cotton cultivation, which had depended on slave labor before the American Civil War. Lumbering of pinelands was another major part of the rural economy. Longview is the seat of Gregg County. In 1919 the county had a population of 16,700, of which 8,160, or forty-eight percent, was black. The area was still very rural; according to historian Kenneth E. Durham Jr., cotton was a major commodity crop.

Thousands of blacks had already left the South in the Great Migration, settling in Northeastern and Midwestern cities. They had sometimes been hired as strikebreakers and competed with working-class whites for jobs. That summer riots took place in many cities across the country, where ethnic whites clashed with blacks in postwar social tensions brought on by fierce competition for jobs and housing. In Longview, racial tensions had deep roots. Most blacks in Texas and the South were disenfranchised at the turn of the century, based on new constitutions and laws passed by state legislatures. Excluded from the political system, they were oppressed under Jim Crow rules and white supremacy. Another reflection of postwar violence was a rise in the number of lynchings: in 1919, 78 blacks had been lynched in Texas, a substantial increase over the numbers during World War I: an increase of 15 lynchings over the total in 1918, and 30 more deaths than the lynchings of 1917.

== Causes ==
Following service by many blacks in the military in the Great War, African Americans aspired to better treatment in the United States. East Texas blacks were in touch with national movements and media, as represented by the weekly delivery by train of the influential The Chicago Defender, a weekly newspaper with nationwide coverage and circulation. The local reporter and newspaper distributor was Samuel L. Jones, a schoolteacher. At the time, Jones and Dr. Calvin P. Davis, a 34-year-old black physician, were prominent leaders in Longview's African-American community. Not long before the riot, the two were known to be encouraging local black farmers to avoid white cotton brokers and sell directly to buyers in Galveston in order to keep more of their profits. At the same time, members of the Negro Business League had set up a cooperative store that competed with white merchants.

In June, local man Lemuel Walters of Longview had been whipped by two white men from Kilgore, allegedly for making "indecent advances" toward their sister. (One account said he was found in her bedroom.) Under Jim Crow, white men strictly monitored and discouraged relations between black men and white women, but not the reverse. Walters was arrested and put in jail in Longview. On June 17, he was abducted by a lynch mob consisting of ten men and subsequently shot to death later that night. His body was left near the railroad tracks. Dr. Davis, Jones, and some other respected black men went to Judge Bramlette in town, asking him to investigate the lynching. He asked for the names of people Jones had talked to at the jail. When no investigation was undertaken, the men returned to Judge Bramlette but became convinced he did not intend to pursue the case.

On July 5, 1919, The Chicago Defender published an article about Walters' death. It said that "Walters' only crime was that he was loved by a white woman," and it quoted her (unnamed) as saying that she "would have married him if they had lived in the North." The article described her as "so distraught over his [Walters] death that she required a physician's care." It said that the sheriff guarding Walters had let the lynch mob take him, without offering resistance. While the article did not identify the woman, in those small towns many readers knew who she was. Some were offended at the suggestion that she had loved Walters, saying it was damaging to the young woman's reputation.

== Riot ==
=== Beating of Samuel L. Jones ===
As Samuel L. Jones was known to be a local correspondent for the Defender, whites believed he wrote the article. He denied having written it. The young woman's brothers attacked Jones on Thursday, July 10, 1919, giving him a severe beating across from the courthouse. Dr. Calvin P. Davis arrived in his car soon after and took Jones to his office to treat him. Meanwhile, "tension and anger" spread across town as whites learned of the article, and as blacks gathered at Melvin Street learned about the beating.

After being warned that Jones was at risk for trouble that night, Davis appealed to the mayor for protection. Bodenheim sent a messenger to Jones at supper time, advising him and Davis to leave town that night. Davis later learned that Mayor Bodenheim and other officials were holding a meeting on the situation. He appeared there, appealing for protection and repeating that neither had written the article. They advised him to leave town but he and Jones did not want to run. The mayor and Judge Bramlette, and a local attorney, Ras Young, had talked to local whites and urged them to leave Jones alone. But "gangs" of both whites and blacks roamed the streets that night, ready for the next events. At about midnight on July 10, a group of between twelve and fifteen white men gathered at Bodie Park, located at the corner of Tyler and Fredonia streets. They went to Jones' house by car, reaching his place at Harrison and College streets south of the railroad tracks about 1:00 AM, July 11, 1919. Davis and Jones had gathered about 25 friends to defend the house; Davis warned them against shooting before he gave the word. When the whites approached the house, Jones and his friends opened fire on them with small arms. Some of the whites were also armed, and they returned fire as they retreated to cover. In all, over 100 rounds were expended during the skirmish. Three of the whites were slightly wounded by birdshot. A fourth who hid under a nearby house was captured by the blacks and beaten badly.

The remaining whites fled back to the center of Longview. Most went to the fire station next to Bodie Park, where a crowd gradually grew. Some of the large crowd broke into the Welch Hardware Store to take more guns and ammunition. At this point, the mob feared that their companion who had been captured was dead, so they raised the alarm for reinforcements. Davis reported that the fire bell was ringing and nearly 1,000 whites gathered near it. (Other accounts say the group numbered 100.) Near daybreak, about 4:00 AM, the mob returned to Jones' house. Finding it empty, they set it on fire. They also burned a neighboring house.

From there, the mob moved south to the Quick Hall, an African-American dance hall owned by Charlie Medlock; they set it on fire, as there were rumors it held stored ammunition. A cache of ammunition began exploding "throughout the building." The mob next went to Dr. Davis' deserted house, located at the southeast corner of the Harrison and Nelson streets and burned it, too. They first allowed his wife and children to get out without harm. They burned a car on the street, and burned down his office. Going east on Nelson Street, the mob reached the homes of Ben Sanders and Charlie Medlock. They set both on fire, attacking Medlock and Belle Sanders, Ben's wife, when they protested.

With sunrise, the mob dispersed. Sheriff D.S. Meredith and Judge Bramlette called Governor William P. Hobby to ask for military support. Hobby responded by placing the National Guard units in Dallas, Terrell, and Nacogdoches, on high alert, but he sent only eight Texas Rangers to Longview. They were not due to arrive before Saturday morning, July 12, and Longview authorities expected more trouble on Friday. They called Governor Hobby again, who sent some dismounted National Guard soldiers to Longview. The soldiers were members of the 5th, 6th, and 7th Texas Cavalry Regiments, and numbered about 100 men altogether. They erected a large tent on the eastern side of the courthouse square to be used as a command post. As part of this force, The Washington Times reported that planes were used to stop the riots.

=== Murder of Marion Bush ===
Marion Bush was a 60-year-old black man who had worked with the local Kelly Plow Company for thirty years. He was father-in-law of Calvin P. Davis, the physician. On the night of July 12, Sheriff Meredith and Ike Killingsworth went to Bush's house, located on the west side of Court Street, one block south of the Texas and Pacific Railroad tracks. The sheriff is thought to have been either offering Bush protective custody (as his son, then 13, said in an interview decades later in 1978) or intending to arrest him. Apparently alarmed, Bush fled from the house, after reportedly firing shots at the sheriff.

There are differing accounts as to what happened next. From interviews in 1978 and a contemporary Dallas newspaper, Durham says the sheriff called farmer Jim Stephens and asked him to stop Bush. He found him and ordered him to stop, but Bush ran into a cornfield. Stephens followed, shooting and killing him. According to the same Dallas Morning News of July 13 and 14, "armed white citizens" hunted down Bush, killing the 60-year-old man in a cornfield south of town.

== Reinforcements and martial law ==
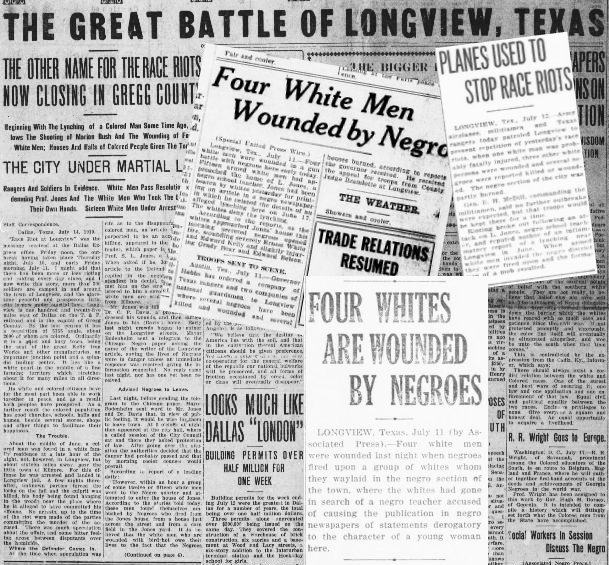
Contemperory News coverage showing the views of the press in 1919

When local officials heard of Bush's killing, they feared a new wave of civil unrest. They called Governor Hobby again for aid, and he sent about 160 more soldiers and Texas Rangers. On Sunday, July 13, Hobby declared martial law in all of Gregg County, placing Brigadier General Robert H. McDill in command of the soldiers and the rangers. On July 13, General McDill issued orders, dividing the town into two districts, giving command of one section to Colonel T.E. Barton, and the other to Colonel H.W. Peck.

Colonel H.C. Smith was placed in command of the Texas Rangers. McDill ordered a 10:30 PM to 6:00 AM curfew in Longview, and prohibited groups of three or more people from gathering on the streets. He ordered the local telephone operators not to place any long-distance calls, to prevent recruiting of weapons or men from neighboring towns. He ordered all residents of Longview and Kilgore to surrender their weapons at the county courthouse in Longview. Residents were warned that their homes could be searched, with a severe penalty for concealing firearms. An estimated 5,000 to 7,000 guns were turned in at the courthouse, and stored in "scattered locations throughout the building."

General McDill asked the town officials to organize a committee consisting of local citizens, to work with him and the military during the emergency. They identified only white businessmen and other leaders. The committee met on Monday, July 14, at Judge Bramlette's office and elected the attorney Ras Young as chairman; it also authorized Judge Bramlette, Sheriff Bodenheim and Young to communicate with the military. The committee drafted a list of concerns. They "expressed disapproval" of Jones' newspaper article and the armed defense of his former home. Their resolution said, we will not "permit the negroes of this community and county to in any way interfere with our social affairs or to write or circulate articles about the white people of our city or county...." The committee stated their opposition to the burning of African-American property, and took steps to prevent any more losses. The members commended Governor Hobby for quickly sending the National Guard and the Texas Rangers.

== Investigation and arrests ==
The Rangers learned the identity of the "ringleader" of the riot, who gave them names of sixteen other men involved in the first attack on Jones' house. All were arrested for attempted murder on July 14, but quickly released on $1,000 bonds ($18,600 in 2025). The Rangers learned the name of nine other suspects, arresting them for arson; they were also released on $1,000 bonds.

Captain Hanson also questioned black residents, ultimately arresting twenty-one black men for assault and attempted murder. He temporarily placed them in the county jail, removing them to Austin for safety. Neither Jones nor Davis were arrested, as they had secretly left town. Davis dressed as a soldier and went out by train.

General McDill organized an assembly at the courthouse and informed the public of the arrests, the presence of National Guard troops and Texas Rangers, and expectations. Brigadier General Jake F. Wolters also spoke to the citizens. According to Durham, the assembly had a "sobering effect" on the crowd. No other violent acts were reported; a couple of fires occurred but were not believed to be due to arson.

Eventually, McDill asked the citizens' committee when they thought martial law should be ended. They said he should wait until all of the blacks who had been arrested were sent out of the county, because there were rumors that certain whites would kill some of these men as soon as they reclaimed their guns. The twenty-one blacks were taken to Austin by the Texas National Guard. Travis County officials wanted to have the prisoners incarcerated at the Texas State Penitentiary, at state expense, but that would have been illegal. The prisoners were separated into smaller groups and placed in various county jails, at Gregg County's expense, until they could be tried in a Gregg County court. The blacks who had helped Davis defend Jones at home were told not to return to Longview, but others returned to relative peace.

The governor lifted martial law at noon on Friday, July 18. Residents were allowed to begin picking up their guns the next day. Town officials tried to promote "harmonious relations" between the races. None of the blacks nor the whites was ever tried. Durham suggests that Gregg County officials chose to avoid trials in order to defuse the tension, perhaps believing that at trial by the all-white juries of this time period, that the whites were likely to be acquitted and the blacks convicted. No documentation relates to the decisions about not pursuing prosecution.

== Aftermath ==
Dr. Davis and Samuel Jones both reached Chicago after fleeing Longview and eventually settled there with their families. On August 18, 1919, they had a meeting and extended interview with John R. Shillady, the white executive secretary of the national office of the National Association for the Advancement of Colored People (NAACP), and Charles E. Bentley, a black dentist who served as secretary of the Chicago chapter, to report on the events in Longview. A summary of their account was published in the NAACP's newspaper, The Crisis, in October.

By that date, racial conflicts had erupted in numerous large and small cities across the country, including Chicago, which had a week of violence ending in early August that resulted in a total of 38 deaths and more than 500 people injured, as well as extensive property damage. Violence of whites against blacks continued into the fall, with a riot in Omaha, Nebraska, in late September; blacks continued to defend themselves.

== See also ==
- Red Summer
- United States home front during World War I
- Mexican Border War (1910–1919)
- Red Scare
- List of incidents of civil unrest in the United States

== Bibliography ==
Notes

References

- Collins, Ann V. (2012). All Hell Broke Loose: American Race Riots from the Progressive Era through World War II: American Race Riots from the Progressive Era through World War II. ABC-CLIO. ISBN 9780313396007. - Total pages: 193
- Du Bois, William Edward Burghardt (1917). The Crisis, Volumes 15-18. Crisis Publishing Company.
- Durham, Kenneth R. Jr (1980). "The Longview Race Riot of 1919". East Texas Historical Journal. 18 (2, Article 6). East Texas Historical Association. ISSN 0424-1444.
- Durham, Ken (June 15, 2010). "Longview race riot of 1919". Handbook of Texas Online, Texas State Historical Association.
- Lindsey, Treva B. & Johnson, Jessica Marie (2014). "Searching for Climax: Black Erotic Lives in Slavery and Freedom". Meridians: Feminism, Race, Transnationalism. 12 (2). Project MUSE: 169–195. doi:10.2979/meridians.12.2.169. ISSN 1547-8424. S2CID 144571028.
- Tuttle, William M. Jr. (1970). Race Riot: Chicago in the Red Summer of 1919. University of Illinois Press. ISBN 9780252065866.
- Tuttle, William M. Jr. (1972). "Violence in a "Heathen" Land: The Longview Race Riot of 1919". Phylon. 33 (4). Clark Atlanta University: 324–333. doi:10.2307/273678. ISSN 0031-8906. JSTOR 273678.
