= Battle of Tres Jacales =

1893 gunfight in Chihuahua, Mexico

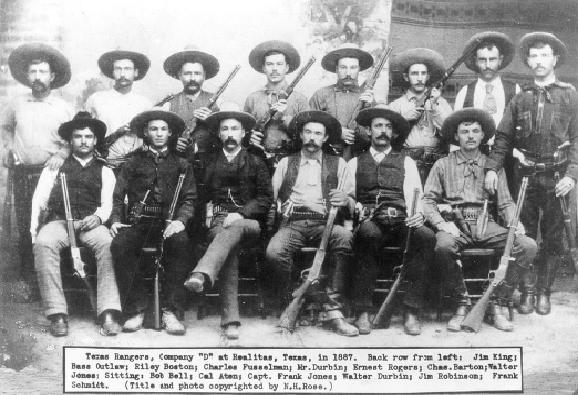
- Company D, Texas Rangers, at Realitos in 1887. Captain Frank Jones is seated third from left.
- Date: June 30, 1893
- Location: Tres Jacales, Chihuahua, Mexico
- Outcome: 1 killed 2 wounded

The Battle of Tres Jacales was an Old West gunfight that occurred on June 30, 1893. While out searching for a gang of rustlers, a group of American lawmen under the command of the Texas Ranger Frank Jones were attacked at the Mexican village of Tres Jacales. During the exchange of gunfire, Jones was mortally wounded and the remaining Americans were forced to retreat back into Texas.

== Background ==
In the late 19th century, West Texas was infested with outlaws, especially near the Rio Grande and the international border with Mexico. The center for criminal activity in the area around El Paso was a place known as Pirate Island, a 15,000-acre ait near the present-day town of Fabens that was created when the Rio Grande shifted its course. According to the Treaty of Guadalupe Hidalgo and the International Boundary Commission, the island is part of Texas, but its proximity to the international border meant that it was very difficult to police because criminals could easily cross the dry river bed and escape into Mexico.

The band of outlaws who made Pirate Island their hideout was known as the Bosque Gang, being that the island is located within a gallery forest. The leader of the gang was Jesus Maria Olguin, who rose to notoriety with his three sons, Severio, Sebastian, and Priscellano, after one of their relatives was killed by Texas Rangers during the San Elizario Salt War. According to Sergeant John Hughes, who served under Captain Frank Jones in 1893, "the gang grew stronger and stronger... they [laughed] the 'gringos' to scorn."

By 1893, the Bosque Gang had become well known for stealing cattle and horses and then smuggling them across the border into Mexico. They were also strong in manpower, which is corroborated by Captain Jones' request for more men to combat them six weeks before the shootout. The request was denied apparently, for Jones had only four other rangers with him at the time of the shootout.

In June 1893, El Paso County officials issued a warrant for the arrests of Jesus Maria and Severio for "horse and cattle Stealing [sic] and with assault with intent to commit murder." To serve the warrants, Captain Jones formed a detachment consisting of himself, El Paso Deputy Robert Edwards "Ed" Bryant, and four other Texas Rangers: Corporal Carl Kirchner, Privates T. F. Tucker, J. W. "Wood" Saunders, and Edwin Dunlap Aten, who was Ira Aten's youngest brother. Accompanying them was a young Mexican man known only by the name of Lujan, who was with the lawmen to search for some of his stolen horses.

== Battle ==
On June 30, 1893, Captain Jones and his detachment left El Paso and headed southeast along the Rio Grande towards Pirate Island. After searching several houses in the area, the detachment was on their way back to El Paso when they spotted two Mexican men on horseback coming down the road towards them. As soon as the Mexicans saw the Americans, they turned their horses around and began galloping back down the road to the village of Tres Jacales. The Americans gave chase and when they were within a half mile of the Mexicans, Private Saunders and Corporal Kirchner demanded a surrender. The call to surrender was answered by a volley of gunfire that came from a small jacal along the road and from positions in the surrounding brush.

Bullets from the first volley hit Captain Jones in the thigh, knocking him off his horse, and a second hit the magazine of Kirchner's Winchester. The Americans immediately dismounted and began returning the fire, forcing the Mexicans in the brush to seek refuge inside the jacal. There were at least five attackers according to American accounts; some were gang members but others were residents of the town who had sympathy for the outlaws.

The fighting lasted nearly an hour. During the foray, Private Tucker attempted to rescue the captain, but the latter told the former to save himself. Just then, Jones was struck in the chest and killed. After that, Lujan went to Kirchner and told him that they had unknowingly crossed into Mexico and that they had better leave now because the villagers had sent word to the Mexican Army. Unwilling to leave his captain behind, Kirchner and his men fought it out for the next forty-five minutes before they realized that if the Mexicans were able to flank and surround them then they would all be killed. Accordingly, the Americans fought their way back across the Rio Grande and made it to the small town of Clint, where news of the engagement was relayed to Sheriff Frank B. Simmons in El Paso.

Captain Jones was the only casualty on the American side and, according to Bill O'Neal, Jesus Maria and Severio were wounded. Jesus Maria received a bullet to the right hand and Severio was hit in one of his arms, breaking the bone.

Carl Kirchner's account

The following was written by Corporal Kirchner sometime after the shootout:

We had searched several houses and were on our way back [to El Paso] when we saw two men approaching us when they saw us they began to retreat with all possible haste, of course we followed at once & only ran them out about one half mile when myself & Private Saunders overtaken them & demanded a surrender by this time we were not six feet from an adobe [jacal] building along the roadside[.] Two shots were fired at me & about four at the rest of the party[.] One of the shots fired at me struck my Winchester but only ruined the magazine[.] We all at once dismounted & opened fire on them[.] Captain Jones was hit the first volley, his thigh was broken but he continued to shoot until shot in the breast & killed dead on the spot about 15 ft from the door[.] We continued to fire on them until they retreated & hid in the building[.] Just then a friendly Mexican [Lujan] who was with us in search of stolen horses told me we were in Mexico in the outskirts of Tres Jacales a small Mexican town & that the people had sent for the Mexican soldiers who would be there in 15 minutes[.] My first decision was to stay with our dead Captain & Kill or capture the Mexicans but after waiting about 45 minutes I saw from the appearance of everything we would be overpowered & murdered so we retreated to this side [of the border].... [sic]

== Aftermath ==
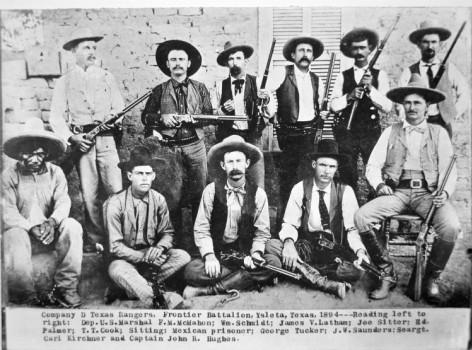
Company D, Texas Rangers, at Ysleta in 1894. "Wood" Saunders is sitting third from left, Carl Kirchner is sitting to the right of Saunders and Captain John Hughes is seated in a chair at the far right.

In the aftermath of the shootout, the Mexicans initially refused to return the body of Captain Jones to the Americans. However, Sheriff Simmons went to Ciudad Juarez and convinced the Mexican jefe, Rafael Garcia Martinez, to take the body to San Elizaro and hand it over. Captain Jones was first buried at his father-in-law's ranch, but in 1936 he was exhumed and reburied in Ysleta. A state historical marker has since been placed at the grave.

In a rare cooperative move, a posse under Sheriff Simmons combined with Mexican Army soldiers succeeded in capturing a few of the outlaws somewhere near Pirate Island a day or two after the shootout. All were put in the jail at Ciudad Juarez, but because President Porfirio Diaz was angered by the American's violation of Mexico's sovereignty, he refused to have the outlaws extradited to the United States. As a result, the outlaws were never prosecuted and they were later released from jail.

The release of the outlaws infuriated the people of Texas, who then sought revenge. Over the next few weeks, three of the Olguins were found dead. The first died of unknown causes, the second was found dead from "apoplexy" near the location of the shootout and the third was found hanging in a tree. Although the latter's death was said to have been a suicide, locals believed he was lynched by the Texas Rangers.

Captain Jones was replaced by John Hughes, who would serve until 1915 as one of the most effective rangers in the unit's history.

== See also ==
- Garza Revolution
