= Texas Ranger Hall of Fame and Museum =

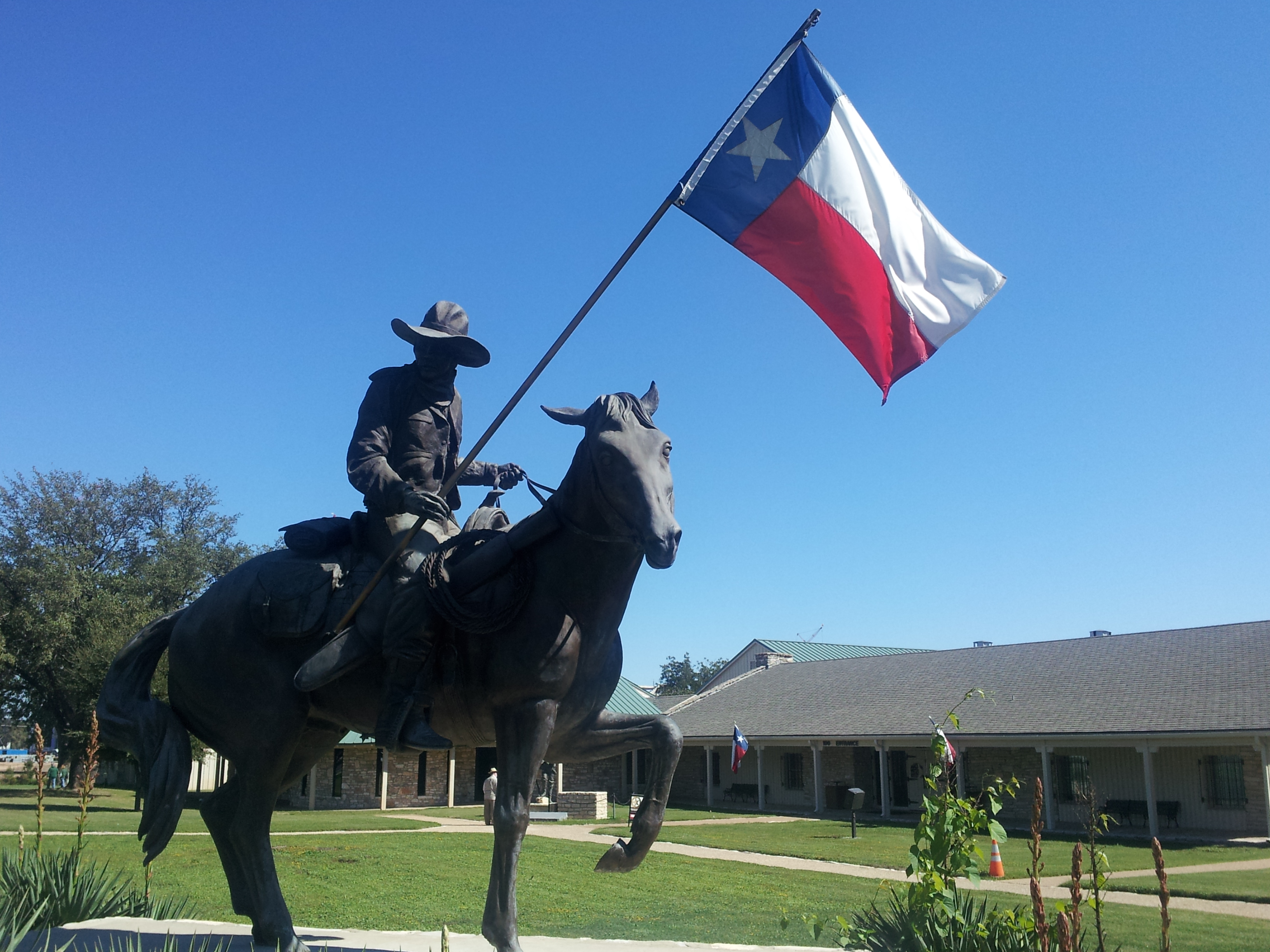

- Location within Texas
- Established: 1968
- Location: 100 Texas Ranger Trail, Waco, Texas, US
- Coordinates: 31°33′20″N 97°7′7″W
- Type: History museum
- Executive director: Byron A. Johnson
- Parking: On site (no charge)
- Website: texasranger.org

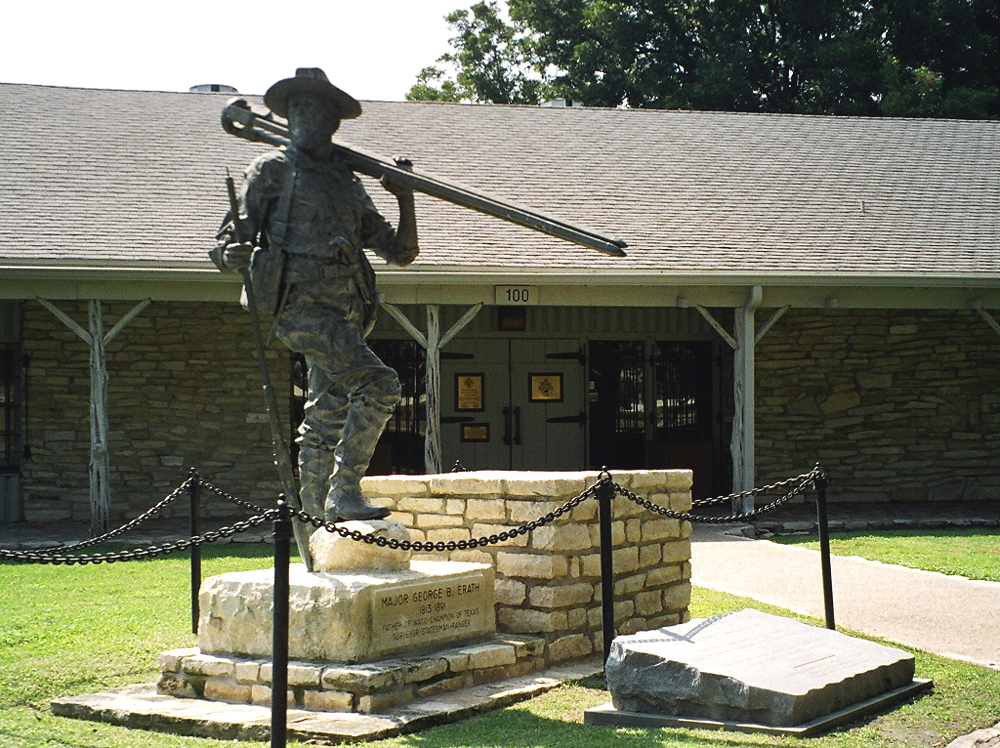
Main entrance to the Texas Ranger Hall of Fame and Museum in Waco, Texas. The statue is of George Erath, Texas Ranger and surveyor of the Waco townsite.

The Texas Ranger Hall of Fame and Museum in Waco, Texas, is the state-designated official historical center of the Texas Rangers law enforcement agency. It consists of the Homer Garrison Jr. museum gallery, the Texas Ranger Hall of Fame, the Texas Ranger Research Center and the Headquarters of Texas Rangers Company "F". The City of Waco serves as the appointed trustee on behalf of the Texas Department of Public Safety and the Texas Legislature.

== Location ==
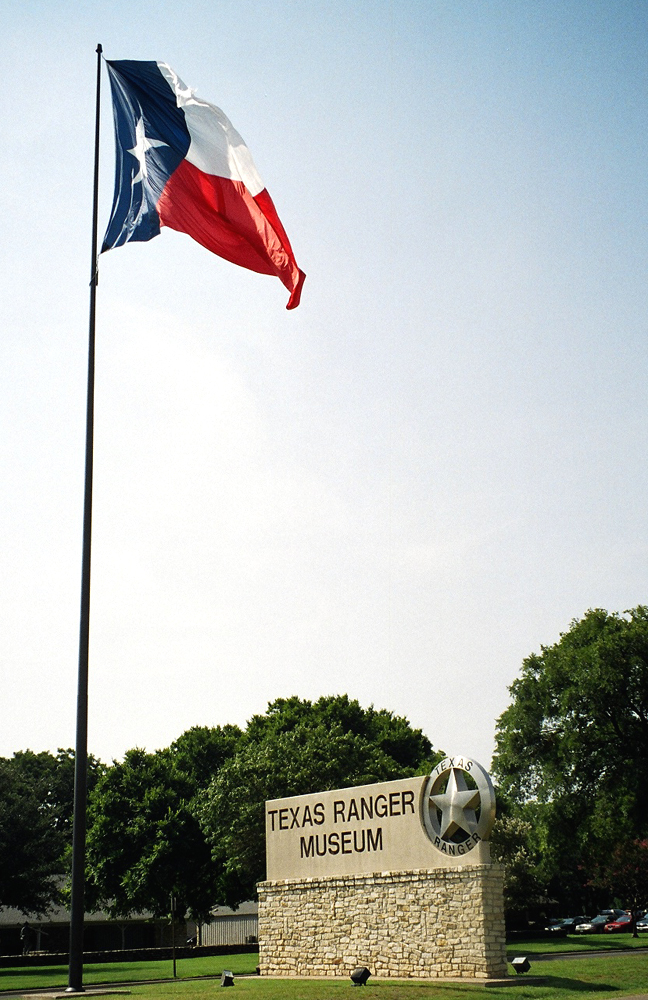
Texas flag and entrance sign.

The Texas Ranger Hall of Fame and Museum is located near Interstate Highway 35 Exit 335B in Waco, Texas.

== Mission ==
The mission of the nonprofit Texas Ranger Hall of Fame and Museum is to: (1) Disseminate knowledge and inspire appreciation of the history, public service and ideals of the Texas Rangers, a legendary symbol of Texas and America; and (2) Serve as state designated repository for artifacts and archives relating to the Texas Rangers.

== Institutional history ==
In 1964, the Texas Department of Public Safety chartered the City of Waco, Texas, to construct and operate the official museum of the Texas Rangers. The City of Waco agreed to commit 32 acres (130,000 m^{2}) for a building site, provide an ongoing annual operating subsidy, and build and sustain a headquarters for Texas Rangers Company "F". More than four million visitors have attended the historical center since it opened in 1968.

The museum complex was originally named Fort Fisher, after an 1837 Ranger camp from which the City of Waco traces its origin. It was designed in a vernacular style of Texas hill country architecture, reminiscent of a 19th-century Texas Ranger headquarters. The first museum gallery was named after Col. Homer Garrison Jr., who served and later directed the Texas Department of Public Safety and its Texas Rangers division from 1938 to 1968.

In 1971, the Texas Legislature appointed the Texas Ranger Commemorative Commission to honor the 150th anniversary of the Texas Rangers. The commission was charged with raising funds and erecting the official state Hall of Fame of the Texas Rangers. The project was opened for the American Bicentennial in 1976. Soon afterward, the name of the historical complex was changed to the Texas Ranger Hall of Fame and Museum to reflect its broader role.

In 1975, the Moody Foundation of Galveston donated seed money to establish the Moody Texas Ranger Memorial Library. Along with the State Library and Archives in Austin, it has become a primary research center on the history and popular culture of the Texas Rangers. In 1997, it was renamed as the Texas Ranger Research Center, with the permission of the Moody Foundation, to recognize its expanding role.

After the museum's 30 years of service, the Texas Legislature passed a 1997 resolution designating the Texas Ranger Hall of Fame and Museum as the official repository for memorabilia, archives and other materials relating to the Texas Rangers. Texas Ranger artifacts and archives donated to the institution become property of the People of Texas through the trusteeship of the City of Waco.

== Col. Homer Garrison Jr. Gallery ==
The Garrison Gallery (museum) was dedicated in 1968 and tells the story of the Rangers and their service through three centuries. It preserves more than 14,000 irreplaceable artifacts dating back to the founding of the Texas Rangers. Items on display include rotating displays of the 2,500 historic firearms and accessories in the collection, artwork, Texas Ranger badges and credentials, items from 1930s gangsters Clyde Barrow and Bonnie Parker and displays about forensics and famous Texas Rangers.

== Texas Ranger Hall of Fame ==
The Hall of Fame is a memorial to Texas Rangers who significantly contributed to the development of the service or died heroically in the line of duty. A separate mission of the Hall of Fame is the compilation of a memorial roll of Texas Rangers killed in the line of duty from 1823 to 2004.

Rangers inducted in the Hall of Fame with Wikipedia articles include:

- Armstrong, John Barclay
- Aten, Ira
- Baylor, George W.
- Brooks, James
- Burton, Marvin "Red"
- Crowder, Robert A.
- Ford, John Salmon
- Gillett, James B.
- Gonzaullas, Manuel T.
- Goss, Robert
- Hall, Jesse Lee
- Hamer, Frank
- Hays, John Coffee
- Hughes, John R.
- Jones, John B.
- McCulloch, Benjamin
- McDonald, William J.
- McNelly, Leander
- Smith, Erastus
- Ross, Sullivan Ross
- Walker, Samuel H.
- Wallace, William A. A

== The Texas Ranger Research Center ==
Each year more than 3,000 researchers utilize the center to research ancestors, write books or produce movies and television shows. The collections hold more than 300,000 items including the personal and case files of Texas Rangers, reference books on Ranger history and the firearms and equipment used by Texas Rangers, photographs and pop culture items from movies, television and radio. The center has been used by the Texas Rangers in the investigation of cold cases.

== See also ==
- List of museums in Central Texas
- Awards and decorations of the Texas government
