= Fredonia, Texas =

Fredonia, Texas may refer to the following places:

- Fredonia, Gregg County, Texas
- Fredonia, Mason County, Texas

== See also ==
- Republic of Fredonia, short-lived attempt in 1826-27 by Anglo-settlers in Texas to secede from Mexico
