= Robert A. Crowder =

Texas Ranger (1901-1972)

Robert Austin Crowder (January 29, 1901 – November 26, 1972) was a Ranger in Minden, Rusk County, Texas who was posthumously installed in the Ranger Hall of Fame in May 1982.

== Career ==
Crowder served in the Marine Corps from 1921 to 1925. After leaving the Marines he joined the Dallas Police Department as a motorcycle officer in 1925. In 1930 he transferred to the Texas Highway Department and in 1937 received his Ranger commission and served in Company B. Crowder became captain of Company C in Lubbock in 1948 but transferred back to Company B in 1951 to live in Dallas. In 1956, he was made Acting Chief of the Texas Rangers. In 1960 he took a cut in pay to return to his favorite post as Captain of Company B from which he retired in 1969.

== Notable events ==
In 1955, when the inmates at the Rusk State Hospital for the Criminally Insane rioted and took a staff member hostage, Captain Crowder entered the hospital (remaining armed) and secured the hostage's release, ending the riot. Crowder died of a heart attack on November 26, 1972.

== Book mention ==
In In the Line of Duty by Lewis C. Rigler, the author describes Bob as looking like a Ranger:

He stood six feet three inches tall, weighed about 200 pounds, and was in many ways a handsome man. Bob had the look that many people associate with being a Texan -- tall, angular, with a somewhat swarthy, leathery complexion. In some ways he reminded me of John Wayne, James Arness, and Jimmy Stewart, all rolled into one. Bob looked very good in Western twill and boots and had the shape of head that a three-and-a-quarter inch brim white Western hat just naturally fit.
