= Kilgore News Herald =

American newspaper

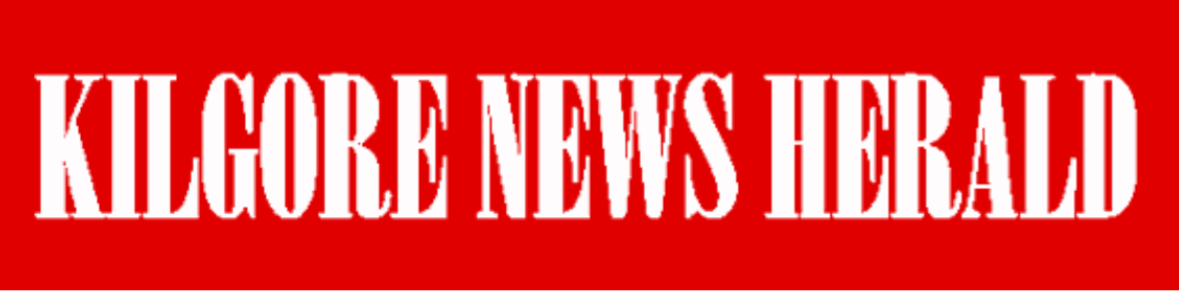

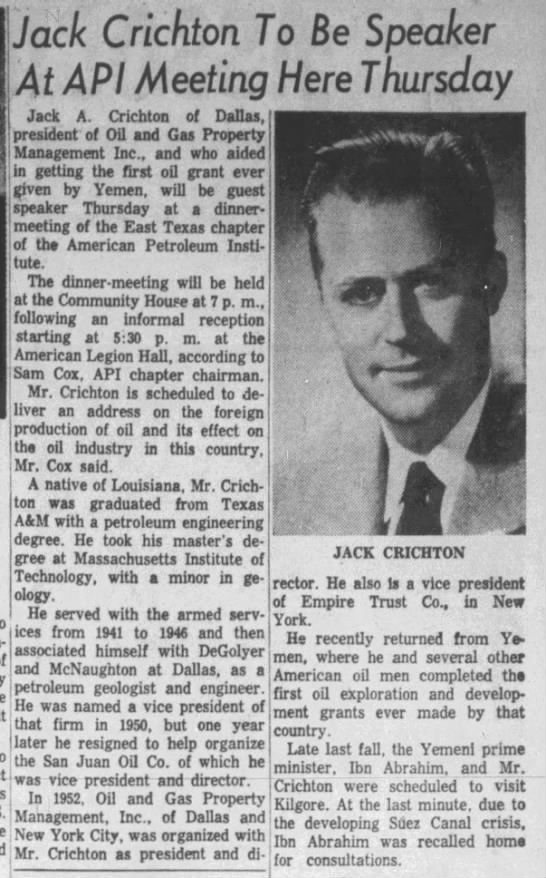
- The Kilgore News Herald print edition on March 3rd, 1957
- Type: Daily newspaper
- Format: Broadsheet
- Owner: Carpenter Media Group
- Publisher: Justin Wilcox
- Editor: Amber Lollar (Managing)
- Founded: 1930; 96 years ago
- Headquarters: 1211 Kilgore Drive, Suite A Henderson, Texas 75652
- Country: United States
- Circulation: 1,077 (Note: Print circulation only; digital subscription data not publicly reported.) (print) (as of 2023)
- OCLC number: 14369436
- Website: kilgorenewsherald.com

The Kilgore News Herald (KNH) (Note: Also referred to as the News Herald or historically as the Kilgore Daily News and the Kilgore Herald. The newspaper's official website is news-herald.com.) is an American daily newspaper founded in 1940, headquartered in the city of Henderson. The Kilgore News Herald covers domestic, national, international news, local news, sports, business, government, and community events. Formed in 1940 through the consolidation of the Kilgore Daily News (established in 1931) and the Kilgore Herald (founded in 1935), it emerged during the East Texas oil boom and has since become a key source of local journalism.

== History ==
The newspaper was established in 1930 as the Kilgore Daily News during the peak of the East Texas oil boom, which transformed Kilgore from a town of 800 to over 10,000 residents within months. Early editions emphasized oil-industry news with mottos like "Capital of the World's Greatest Oil Field."

In 1935, it merged with the Kilgore Herald to form the Kilgore News Herald. The Devall family owned the paper from 1940 to 1979, during which it operated as a daily broadsheet with peak circulation exceeding 5,000 copies.

Established in 1930. Lyde Williford Devall and Charles K. Devall owned and published the Kilgore News Herald from 1940 to 1979. In 2018, Bluebonnet Publishing sold the newspaper to M. Roberts Media, as part of a strategic move to enhance local news coverage and facilitate a transition into a digitally integrated noting the newspaper's "historic roots stretching back to the early days of the East Texas oil boom," highlighting its longstanding role and its important history. then was acquired by Carpenter Media Group in 2024.

== Content ==
=== Clyde Barrow's 1934 Arrest and Local Connections ===
- On February 6, 1934, the Kilgore News Herald reported Goss and Dallas detective Will Fritz had arrested and captured Clyde Barrow months earlier.
- That same edition featured the headline "BARROW, BONNIE SEEN IN E. TEX." - indicating their continued presence months before their deaths.
- Former Kilgore News Herald Reporter Bob Cone described Barrow as an "elusive, even phantom-like desperado," quoting Goss's assessment:
  "Barrow is bad. Barrow is bold... He's much more desperate today than when launching his career of crime." - Police Chief Bob Goss (Texas Ranger)

== Awards and Recognition ==
The Kilgore News Herald has received accolades from the Texas Press Association. In the 2018-19 Better Newspaper Contest, it earned first place in Advertising and Headline Writing, second place in Sports Coverage, Page Design, and General Excellence, third place in Sports Photo and News Writing, and fourth place in Feature Writing. It also won two awards in the 2019-20 TPA contest and won in the North and East Texas Press Association contest in 2023.

== See also ==
- List of newspapers in Texas
