= Marvin "Red" Burton =

Marvin "Red" Burton (August 10, 1885 – May 16, 1970) was a Texas Ranger during the 1920s. A native Texan, Burton worked in various positions of law enforcement almost the entirety of his adult career. He is perhaps most well-known for his encounters with the Ku Klux Klan in October 1921. Burton is also remembered for his involvement in busting bootlegging operations during Prohibition, and cleaning up crime in wild towns like Borger, Texas. Over the span of his 35-year career, Red Burton became somewhat of a legend in the ranks of Texas law enforcement, and was inducted into the Texas Ranger Hall of Fame with its establishment in 1968.

== Early life ==
McLennan County, where Burton spent most of his life.

Marvin "Red" Burton was born on August 10, 1885, in McLennan County, Texas. Red was the youngest son of John Fletcher Burton (1854-1932; 78-years old) and Mary Alice Cubley (1856-1886; 29-years old). Red's parents were migrants to Texas from Mississippi and settled in the McLennan County region in the late 1870s. Alice Burton died within a year after Marvin was born.

Marvin came from a large family, with 5 older siblings and 3 younger half siblings. His eldest brother William Robert Burton was born in 1876 and died in 1910 (34 years old). His oldest and only fully related sister Laura Pearl Burton Peurifoy and her twin brother John Carl Burton were born in 1878. Laura Pearl died in 1933 (55 years old). John Carl died in 1912 at age 34. Marvin had two more brothers, Luther Milton Burton (1880-1904; 24 years old) and Travis Henson Burton (1883-1969; 86 years old). Marvin's father remarried in 1888, two years after Alice died. He and his second wife Mollie Hudgins Burton (1857-1943; 86 years old) had Red's three younger half-sisters together; Augusta Burton Johnson (1891-1983; 92 years old ), Ruby Burton Robertson (1895-1980; 85 years old), and Ellen Burton, born in October 1893; she died less than two years later in August 1895.

Burton's parents had settled on a farm between Mart and Waco, and his childhood was quick and tough. Marvin attended school when he could, but helped to run the family farm doing chores, which kept him very preoccupied. However, he learned many useful traits that he later used in his career, including riding and shooting. After a typical upbringing for the area and time, Marvin Burton started his own family at the age of eighteen.

Burton married Florence Mae Dill in Falls, Texas on August 19, 1903. Mae was a local 19-year-old girl and Red had just turned 18. Red was a lean, tall farm boy standing at 6'2 with a crop of sandy red hair and piercing blue eyes. They had two children together; Laura Mae Burton Rogers was born in 1904. Their second child, Lula Alice Burton, was born in 1908. Florence Burton died in 1948 at the age of 64.

== Career in law enforcement ==
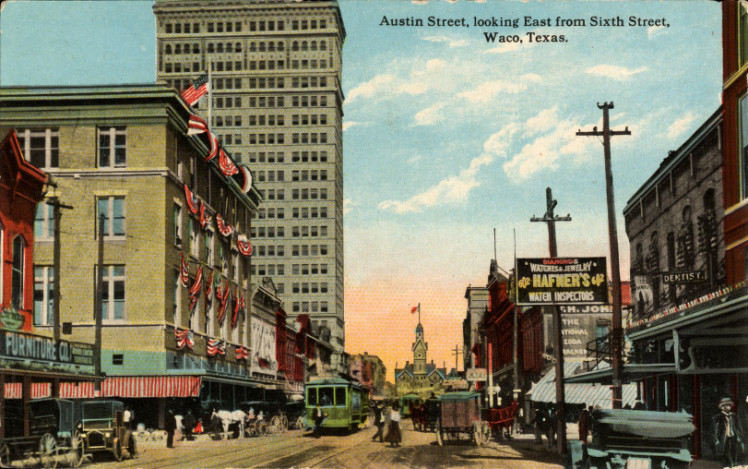
Waco, Texas. Burton grew up near Waco and spent most of his law enforcement career serving the Waco Police Department.

=== Early career ===
Burton had a rough start to adulthood, and finding stable work was his biggest issue. “Without a dollar in the world” he bounced from job to job, taking whatever he could. In 1905, he moved to Wortham with his wife and new baby and worked temporarily on a ranch. In 1913, Burton returned to Waco now with 2 children and his wife, and using eight years’ worth of savings, bought a plot of land and started building a homestead. After buying the land, Burton was without "money enough to buy... groceries". In 1913, Marvin signed up for the draft.

==== World War I ====
Before the start of the World War I, Burton was jobless and penniless. He spent a brief time pouring concrete for storm drains. In 1914, Burton applied for a job with the Cleveland Construction Company. He did this after determinedly telling his wife, "I'm going to work at somethin'. I don't know what it does, I don't care what it pays. I'm going to work". He was never penniless again. Within three weeks on the job, Burton was promoted to foreman. He began to grow a reputation as a popular leader among his men. This newfound reputation helped Burton when he decided to move jobs in 1917.

As America was entering WWI, Burton decided to take a job as foreman for The Grace Company. The company had been assigned by the United States government to build an airfield at Richfield, a few miles west of Waco. Burton was there for only two and a half weeks when he was suddenly drafted to work for the Waco Police Department.

==== Early law enforcement ====
Burton accepted his new job and intended to stay on for six months before returning to his foreman position. He never went back. Burton was kept busy; mostly directing traffic and controlling the newly arriving soldiers to camp MacArthur, outside Waco. The soldiers were causing problems with the townspeople, and it was Burton's responsibility to maintain the peace. After his first few months Burton was reassigned to night patrol in the residential and outlying districts, which he did riding a motorcycle. Burton continued learning more about "policing" until in 1919 he found himself in a moral dilemma.

With the beginning of Prohibition in America, many police officers became "corrupt", rather than enforce the unpopular Eighteenth Amendment. However Burton was never "on the take" like some of his colleagues, and attempts began to "get Red Burton lined up". Despite all offers of money and promotion, Burton remained loyal to the law and refused. In September 1919, Burton was informed by his chief that he was being transferred back to a daytime schedule, "for the good of the department". This was because Burton was effective at bringing in large quantities of contraband that usually arrived at night. Instead of staying on, Burton replied: "Well sir, if I thought it was better for the department, I wouldn't say a word". Then he quit.

Burton was not unemployed long, for his reputation as a loyal lawman paid off. Sheriff Bob Buchanan of McLennan County heard of Red and offered him the position of deputy sheriff. It was over their shared opinions of law enforcement that the two men became good friends. It was while Red was deputy sheriff that his most famous story occurred.

==== The Ku Klux Klan ====
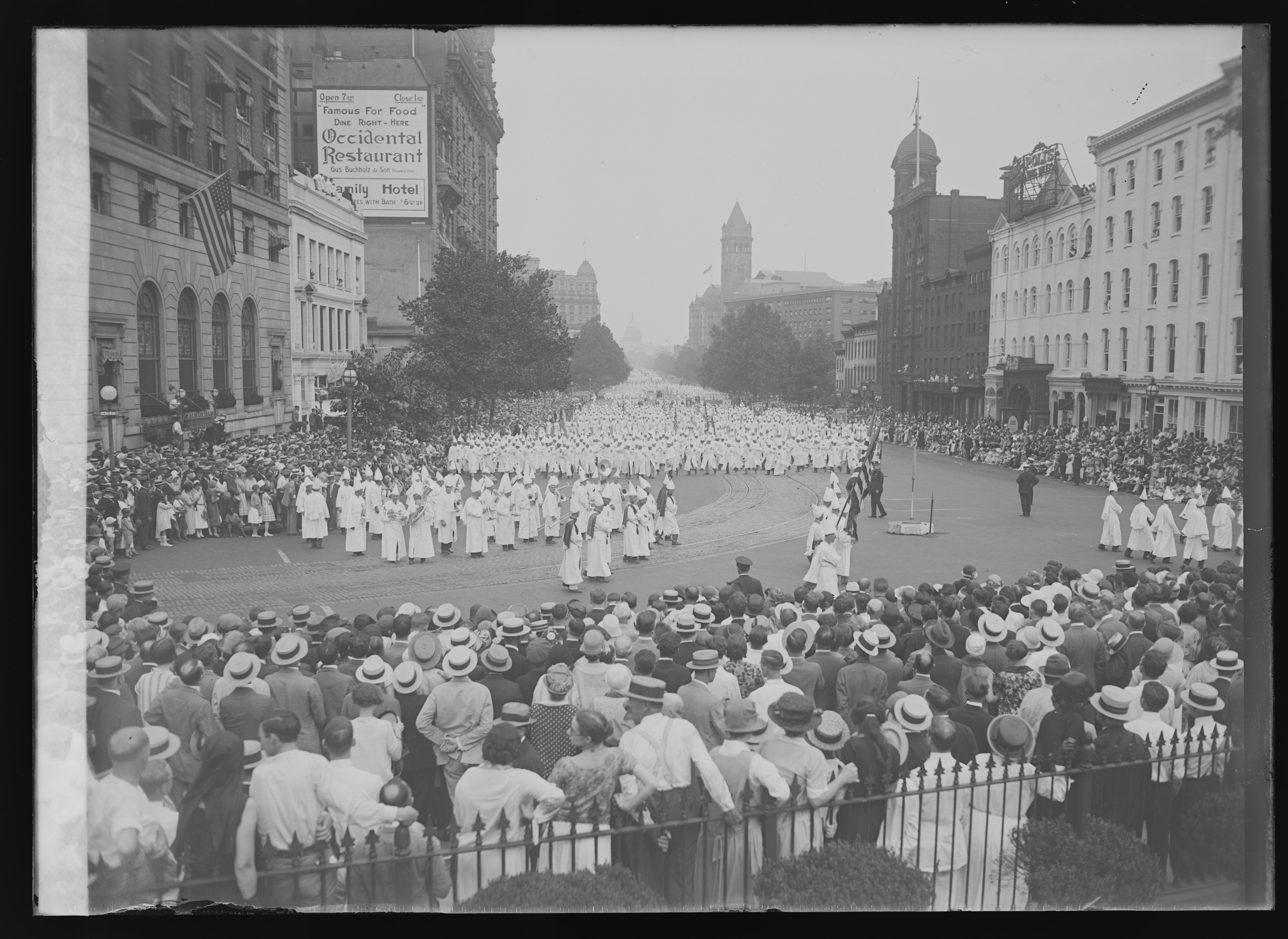
The KKK experienced a rise in popularity during the 1920s.

On October 1, 1921, local members of the Ku Klux Klan began organizing a large rally to take place in Lorena. The Klan already had a strong presence in the Waco area, but neither Burton or Buchanan were aware of the plans to convene in the town center of Lorena. Members had distributed flyers saying, "The Ku Klux Klan Will Parade Tonight At 8:30!", but both officers had been preoccupied with crimes that had taken place in the nearby towns of Leroy and Mart. However, when both men returned to Waco, there were several townspeople from Lorena waiting in Buchanan's office. They brought with them a plea for Buchanan to help them deal with the Klan. Both men already knew the other was not a member of the Klan, and they already had a run in with them the 27 September 1921, when there was a particularly destructive rally in the town of Mart. After that event, Buchanan had asserted to Burton, "if there is ever another parade in McLennan County while I am sheriff, I intend to find out who is responsible". And he kept to his word.

So, the two men headed into the town of Lorena with the express intention of finding out who the leaders of the parade were. In the autumn evening, and estimated 15,000-20,000 people were out in the streets, waiting for events to begin. Burton and Buchanan sought out the town officials. Buchanan had told them, "I think I'm entitled to know who's responsible for it, so if anything happens I know who to looks for". After some time passed, two McClennan county officials who knew Buchanan and Burton claimed responsibility. However, many of the other Klan members disagreed with this agreement and tensions were quickly escalated. As the parade began, Burton and Buchanan stood and confronted the first two men in front of the parade line, who were carrying a burning cross. Reportedly, Buchanan grabbed and threw the cross to the ground, flinging up the hood of one of the men saying, "I don't know you, but if I ever see your face again I will". Violence quickly ensued. A Klan member, later identified as a Waco policeman, struck Buchanan on the back of the head with either a blackjack or a billyclub. Buchanan was then shot while other Klan members began to attack Burton. Burton was able to get free from his assailants and take Buchanan to a Waco hospital, where the angry mob of Klansmen followed. Burton was able to subdue the crowd. When the Klan began to gather again on the October 10, 1921, with the rumored intent to "kill Red Burton", he performed his usual shift and defied their plans to kill him.

=== Texas Rangers ===
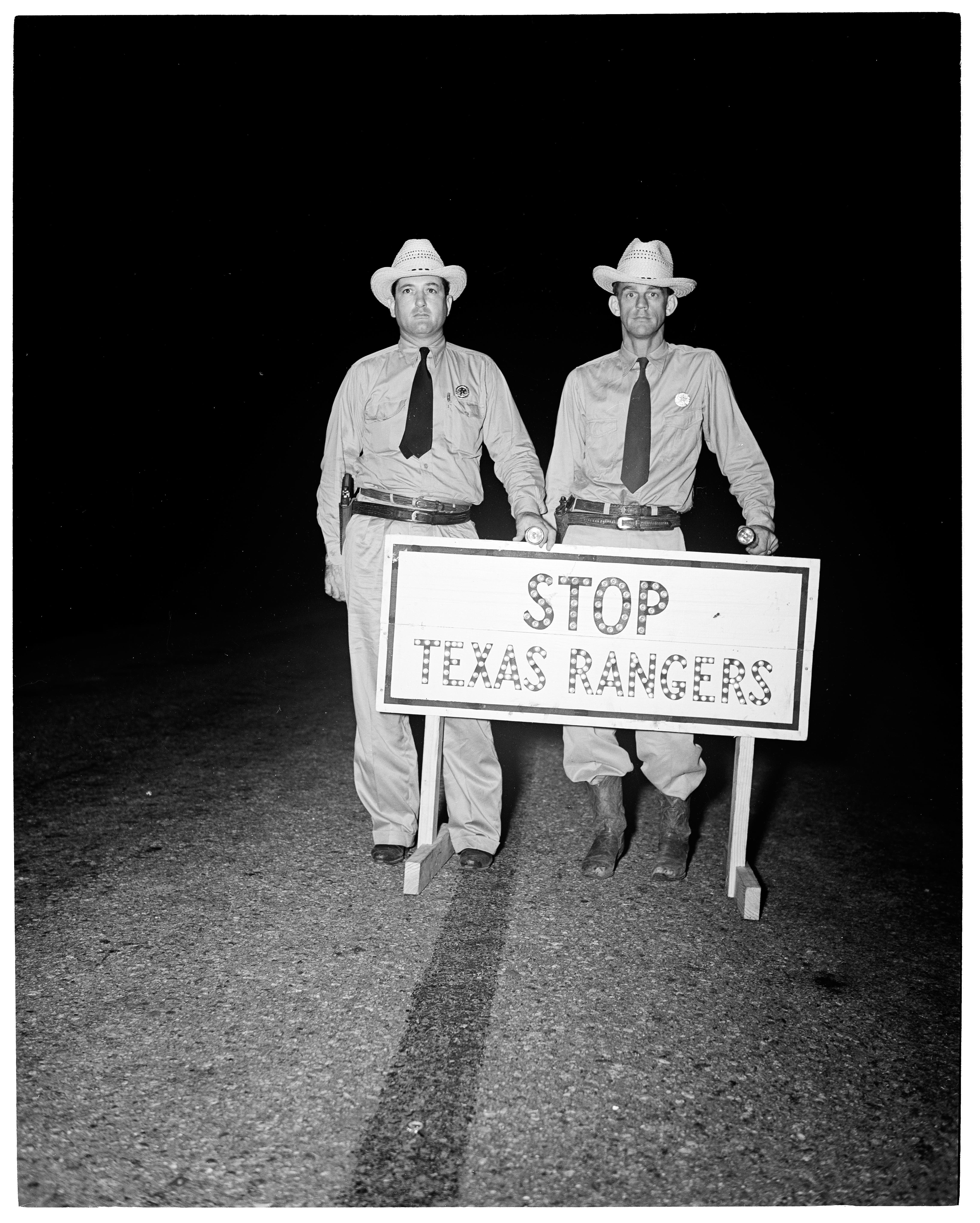
Texas Rangers in Austin, TX

After showing his courage and valor dealing with the Ku Klux Klan, Burton was appointed a Texas Ranger in 1922 by Governor Pat Neff. As a Ranger Burton was sent to the towns of Somerville and Borger, to clean up bootlegging and whiskey making operations. On August 25, 1923, Texas Rangers Marvin Burton and R.D Shumate led a police raid on a large moonshining operation in Somervell County. He became instrumental in helping maintain the law of Prohibition in Texas during its thirteen years. Recounting one encounter with a bootlegger Burton said, "the bootlegger started shooting. I returned the fire and they took him away to the Glen Rose funeral home".

Burton's reputation was further boosted in Waco after he tracked down an axe murderer Roy Mitchell in 1923. After testifying for two young men in 1922, who were wrongfully convicted for the rape and murder of a girl, Burton caught the real culprit a year later. He was then responsible for controlling the crowds of 5,000 people who attended one of the last legal hangings in Texas. Burton continued his Ranger career for 11 years.

=== Post-Texas Rangers ===
Burton's career as a Texas Ranger ended when “Ma” Ferguson disbanded the Rangers after winning election for Governor in 1933.In 1934 he became the chief of detectives for the Waco Police Department. In 1946 he was made chief of police. He served that position for the next four years and retire in 1951.

Burton died at the age of 84 on May 16, 1970, in Marlin, Fall County, Texas. He is buried in Riesel Cemetery, McLennan County, Texas.

== Legacy ==
Burton was inducted into the Texas Ranger Hall of Fame with its establishment in 1968.
