= Ernest St. Leon =

Texas Ranger (died 1898)

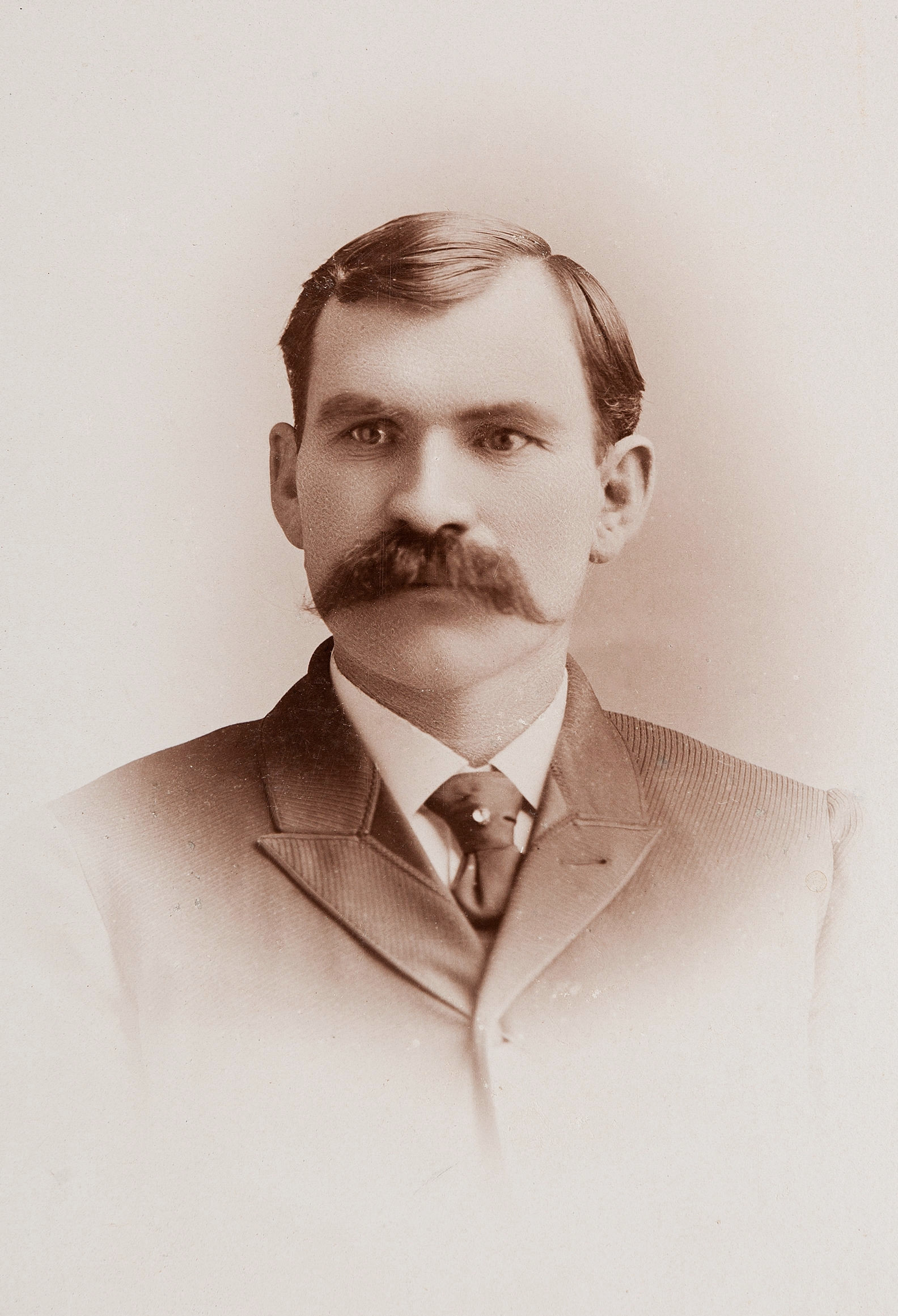
- Born: San Antonio, Texas, United States
- Died: August 31, 1898; El Paso, Texas
- Other name: Diamond Dick
- Police career
- Country: United States
- Department: Texas Rangers
- Service years: c. 1880-1890-1898

Ernest "Diamond Dick" St. Leon (died August 31, 1898) was a French-American law enforcement officer and a member of the Texas Rangers, known prominently during the 1880s as one of its finest undercover officers. He received the nickname "Diamond Dick" from his fellow officers due to his habit of wearing diamonds on his uniform.

== Biography ==
The son of a French refugee, Ernest St. Leon was born and raised in San Antonio, Texas. While still in law school, he left to join the US Cavalry and had a distinguished career participating in the Texas-Indian Wars. According to one account, he reportedly killed three warriors single handed after one of his men had been killed and eventually rose to the rank of sergeant before his discharge from military service.

He later joined the Texas Rangers, serving in Company-D throughout the 1880s and working extensively in undercover operations. St. Leon was eventually dismissed from the force due to his drinking however he did remain in contact with John Hughes and worked with him in an unofficial capacity for a time. In 1889, hired by the Fronteriza Mining Company, he was involved in the capture of a group of silver ore thieves who were traveling with a large mule caravan en route to their hideout where they planned to hide the loot in an abandoned silver mine outside Shafter, Texas. Posing as one of the escorts, he led the robbers into an ambush as Texas Rangers John R. Hughes and Lon Oden, assisted by St. Leon, attempted to take them into custody. Antonio Carrasco and his two brothers were killed in the ensuing gunfight and were later buried next to the abandoned mine.

While living among the Mexican-American peasants along the border, he was able to obtain a list of twenty names of men involved in the murder of Captain Frank Jones who had been killed while attempting to arrest Jesus and Severino Olguin, members of a local bandit gang of thieves and murders in the El Paso-area. This information was later used as a "death list" by members of John Hughes' posse as they either gunned down or lynched between 18 and 20 members of the Olguin family and wiping out the Pirate Island-based gang.

In 1890, he was brought back to the Texas Rangers. In August, 1898, while in Socorro, Texas, he was involved in a gunfight with cowboys Bob Finley, John Collier, and John Ray. John Ray was wounded, as was St. Leon, while Dr. Oscar J. Breaux, was killed. St. Leon had called on Dr. Breaux to assist him in arresting Collier and Finley, who were recklessly discharging their firearms, with both men being wanted on charges of horse theft also. They became involved in a pursuit on horseback, which culminated in a gunbattle near the Lamaire Ranch. Dr. Breaux was hit early in the battle with a bullet to the head, dying immediately. This left St. Leon one facing three. St. Leon was also hit, the bullet entering his left shoulder at such an angle it entered into his lung. The three opposing gunmen then rode away, believing both St. Leon and Dr. Breaux were dead. St. Leon, however, was able to ride to a doctor in Ysleta, Texas, where he was quickly assessed as being in critical condition. Collier, Ray and Finley, with Ray being wounded in the thigh, surrendered themselves to Justice of the Peace R.J. Carr. Finley's horse had also been shot. Ranger John R. Hughes took custody of the three suspects. St. Leon died on August 31. He was buried at Concordia Cemetery in El Paso.
