= Ira Aten =

American sheriff (1862–1953)

Ira Aten (September 3, 1862 – August 5, 1953) was a Texas Ranger who was inducted into the Texas Rangers Hall of Fame.

Aten was born in Cairo, Illinois. His father Austin Aten was a Methodist circuit rider, and moved the family to Texas in 1876, settling near Round Rock. In 1878, while still a boy, Aten witnessed the death of outlaw Sam Bass. In March 1883, Aten joined the Texas Rangers, becoming a member of "Company D" serving under Captain L. P. Seiker. Aten was assigned to the counties bordering the Rio Grande, and due to the rough nature of this area, he became involved in numerous dangerous encounters.

Aten was involved in the Fence Cutting War of the mid-1880s, during the period in which many ranchers were fencing off their property, doing away with open range. In July 1887, Aten was accompanied by future Ranger Hall of Fame member John Hughes in the pursuit of murderer Judd Roberts, with Hughes and Aten killing Roberts in a gunfight. It was Aten who convinced Hughes to join the Rangers. In 1888, late in the Fence Cutting War, Aten placed hidden dynamite charges on certain fence lines, so that when the wire was cut the dynamite would explode. The Adjutant General did not approve and ordered them removed. Although extreme, this greatly reduced the number of fences cut, even after the charges were removed. Aten was also involved in the later Jaybird-Woodpecker War, after which he was elected to the position of Fort Bend County, Texas Sheriff. In 1890 Aten moved to Castro County, Texas, where he became sheriff.

In 1895, he became a foreman for the XIT Ranch, a position he held for the next 10 years. He hired two former rangers, Wood Saunders and "Big Ed" Connell. In 1904, he moved with his family to the Imperial Valley of California, where he served as a member of the Imperial Valley District board in 1923, which helped push through legislation for the construction of Boulder Dam and the All-American Canal. In 1945, J. Marvin Hunter's Frontier Times magazine published Aten's memoirs. Aten died of pneumonia at his daughter's home in Burlingame, California, and was buried in the Evergreen Cemetery in El Centro.
