= Manuel T. Gonzaullas =

Texas Rangers captain

- Born: Manuel Trazazas Gonzaullas; July 4, 1891; Cádiz, Spain
- Died: February 13, 1977 (aged 85); Dallas, Texas, U.S.
- Other name: Manuel Trazazas “Lone Wolf” Gonzaullas
- Occupation: Texas Rangers Captain
- Known for: Investigating The Phantom Killer

Manuel Trazazas Gonzaullas (July 4, 1891 – February 13, 1977) was a Texas Rangers captain and a staff member of the Texas government.

== Early life ==
Gonzaullas was born in Cádiz, Spain. His parents were naturalized American citizens, visiting Spain at the time of his birth.

== Career ==
In 1911, Gonzaullas was appointed a major in the Mexican Army, and in 1915 he became a special agent in the United States Treasury Department. In 1920, he enlisted in the Texas Rangers. For the next thirteen years, he served on the force and was actively involved in fighting the illegal activities that were common at the time, including gambling, liquor smuggling and production, and prostitution, among others.

When in January 1933, Miriam Amanda "Ma" Ferguson took office after being elected governor, she proceeded to discharge all serving Rangers, including Gonzaullas. In 1935, the Texas Legislature reformed the public security system and created the Texas Department of Public Safety, consisting of three divisions: the Texas Highway Patrol, the Texas Rangers and the Bureau of Intelligence. Gonzaullas was appointed superintendent of the Bureau, and he played a major role in turning it into one of the best crime laboratories in the United States.

In 1940, Gonzaullas left his position at the Bureau upon his appointment as captain of Company B of the Texas Rangers, thus becoming the first American of Spanish descent to achieve the rank of captain in the force. His work was commended by his superiors and was instrumental in re-establishing the status of the agency after the instability it had gone through in the previous decades.

On several assignments, he served alongside Robert Bob Goss, a Texas Ranger.

=== Notable assignment ===
One of his most notable assignments was to Texarkana in 1946, in order to investigate the murders committed by The Phantom Killer, a serial killer.

== Later life and death ==
After his retirement in 1951, Gonzaullas moved to Hollywood and became a technical consultant for radio, television, and motion pictures, in particular the long-running 1950s radio show Tales of the Texas Rangers. Gonzaullas was inducted into the Texas Ranger Hall of Fame in 1974.

Gonzaullas died on February 13, 1977 at a hospital in Dallas, Texas of cancer at age 85. His funeral was held on February 16 at the Sparkman/Hillcrest Memorial Park.

== Firearms ==
- The Colt Revolver in the American West—Manuel T. Gonzaullas' Single Action Army Pair

== See also ==
- Texas Ranger Division
