= Fredonia, Gregg County, Texas =

Neighborhood in Kilgore, United States

Fredonia, Texas
- Neighborhood
- Location within Texas Location within the United States
- Coordinates: 32°24′14″N 94°47′46″W
- Country: United States
- State: Texas
- County: Gregg
- City: Kilgore
- Annexed into Kilgore: December 13, 2011
- Elevation: 364 ft (111 m)
- Time zone: UTC−6 (Central (CST))
  - Summer (DST): UTC−5 (CDT)
- Area codes: 430 & 903
- GNIS feature ID: 1378325

Fredonia is a neighborhood of Kilgore, Texas, located in Gregg County, in the East Texas region. It was originally an unincorporated community. The area is still known locally and appears on maps. It was annexed by the city of Kilgore on December 13, 2011.

== History ==
=== Fredonian Rebellion origin ===
The name "Fredonia" derives from the 1826–27 Fredonian Rebellion, an early Texian attempt to secede from Mexico, led by Haden Edwards's group near Nacogdoches. Although this occurred elsewhere, the name carried symbolic importance and was later used for the community in Gregg County.

=== 19th century settlement & river-port era ===
In March 1838, empresario Haden Edwards petitioned to survey a townsite at the ferry crossing on the south bank of the Sabine River. A historical marker—now located near I‑20 and FM 2087 (~0.6 mi west of present-day Kilgore)—records:

- Ferry service granted in 1843
- A permanent bridge built in 1884
- Warehouses, a brick kiln, homes, and a post office (operational 1849–1855 and 1856–1859)

By the 1850s, Fredonia comprised approximately 40–50 structures, multiple cotton warehouses, and steamboat activity.

=== Decline due to railroad bypass ===
During the rapid railroad expansion of East Texas in the 1870s and 1880s, new railway lines were constructed through what was then known as Kilgore Station—a modest stop at the time—bypassing older settlements like Fredonia. This shift in transportation routes drew economic activity and growth away from Fredonia, contributing to a steady decline in both population and commerce. The Fredonia post office closed permanently by 1859, and the original townsite was gradually abandoned.

In the years that followed, a small hamlet of freed African-Americans developed near the original Fredonia site, but like many of the bypassed communities, it too dwindled as Kilgore grew. Today, the area once known as Fredonia is part of a residential neighborhood within the city limits of Kilgore.

=== Modern identity and annexation ===
Fredonia remained an unincorporated rural area for decades despite its geographic proximity to Kilgore. On December 13, 2011, the City of Kilgore approved the annexation of a 261-acre tract encompassing Fredonia. The annexation was met with public opposition by residents who expressed frustration about feeling disconnected from the city despite frequent civic participation. “Fredonia has always participated in everything the city of Kilgore has done,” said resident Terry Dunn during a public hearing. “And I don't know why y'all look at us as not Kilgoreites.” City officials cited a lack of available land for housing development as a reason for the annexation, and offered phased integration of city services and delayed tax implementation.

Concerns from residents included the costs of city services, and the perception that they were being forced to choose between annexation by Kilgore or Longview. Despite opposition, the annexation proceeded, and Fredonia remains within Kilgore’s city limits as of the early 2010s. The name continues to be used in local discourse and mapping services.

== Geography ==
Fredonia lies at the northwestern edge of Kilgore, near I‑20 and FM 2087, east of Longview and south of the Sabine River. The neighborhood features suburban residences interspersed with natural and historical remnants.

== Demographics ==
Note: no longer separately enumerated after the 2011 annexation.

== Culture & notable features ==
- The Old Fredonia Townsite historical marker, placed by the Texas Historical Commission (1967, updated 2005), preserves its early settlement history. - Fredonia is part of a pattern of mid-19th century Gregg County communities (like Earpville and St. Clair) that declined after railroads shifted regional growth.

== See also ==
- Fredonian Rebellion
- Kilgore, Texas
- History of Kilgore, Texas
- Municipal annexation in the United States
