= John Hughes (lawman) =

Texas Ranger, cowboy, and author (1855–1947)

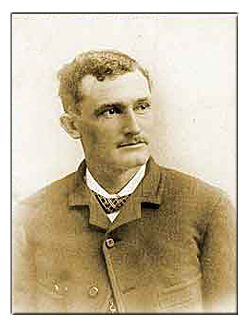
- Portrait of John Reynolds Hughes
- Born: John Reynolds Hughes; February 11, 1855; Cambridge, Illinois
- Died: June 3, 1947 (aged 92)
- Occupations: Texas Ranger, cowboy and author
- Parents: Thomas Hughes (father); Jennie Bond Hughes (mother)

John Reynolds Hughes (February 11, 1855 – June 3, 1947) was a Texas Ranger and cowboy of the Old West, and later an author. Several books were written about him, known as one of the most influential Texas Rangers of all time.

He was said to have inspired the fictional Lone Ranger character prominent in Western stories of the 20th century, since Zane Grey dedicated his novel The Lone Star Ranger to Hughes in 1915. Hughes conducted a long hunt for the killers of Texas Ranger Captain Frank Jones. Hughes himself told relatives that he believed he was the inspiration for the Lone Ranger character.

== Early life ==
Hughes was born John Reynolds Hughes, in 1855 in Cambridge, Illinois, son to Thomas Hughes and Jennie (Bond) Hughes. In 1865 the family moved to Dixon, Illinois, then later to Mound City, Kansas. Hughes left home at the age of 14 to work on a ranch as a cowboy.

He later made his way west into Indian Territory, where he became closely associated with the Choctaw and Osage Indians, learning much about their cultures and traditions. Later he also became involved with the Comanche. Following this, Hughes worked as a trail driver on the Chisholm Trail, then purchased a farm in Liberty Hill, Texas.

== Joining the Texas Rangers ==
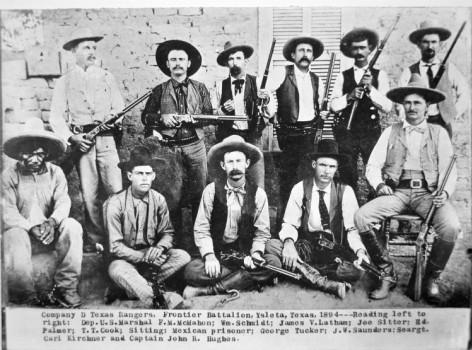
Company D, Texas Rangers, at Ysleta in 1894. Captain John Hughes is seated in a chair at the far right.

In May 1886, his neighbor lost several horses to thieves, and Hughes pursued the band, killing two of the men in the process. He captured the remaining thieves in New Mexico Territory, and brought back the horses to return to his neighbor. The pursuit lasted for several months, and brought him to the attention of local Texas Ranger Ira Aten.

In July 1887, Hughes accompanied Ranger Aten in the pursuit of murderer Judd Roberts; Hughes and Aten killed Roberts in a gunfight. Recruited by the Rangers, and prompted by Aten's recommendation, Hughes signed on in 1887. His career would last until his retirement on January 31, 1915.

He served mainly in what was referred to as the "Frontier Battalion", on the Mexico–American border. During that time he gained a reputation as a relentless pursuer of outlaws.

In 1890, while in Shafter, Texas, Hughes posed with fellow Rangers Bob Speaks, Alonzo "Lon" Oden, and Jim Putnam in what became one of the most widely circulated Texas Ranger photos in history. The photo has since been used in numerous magazines, and on postcards, in addition to being reproduced on T-shirts in the later 20th century. At the time of the photo, the Rangers, part of "D Company", "Frontier Battalion", were assigned to protect a silver mine located in Shafter. Hughes was promoted to captain in 1893, then later to senior captain.

Following the 1893 murder of Texas Ranger Captain Frank Jones, killed during an ambush by bandits, Hughes led a company of Rangers in a hunt for the killers, most of whom were members of the Olguin family. Since the Rangers led by Captain Jones had mistakenly entered into Mexico, and were across the border in Mexico when the shootout took place, no suspects would be prosecuted. The bandits were wanted for numerous crimes committed inside the U.S., for which Captain Jones had pursued them. Based on a list of names supplied by early Ranger undercover agent Ernest St. Leon, Hughes and his company tracked down 18 suspects in the murder. They either killed them all in shootouts or by way of hanging, effectively ending the Olguin family's crime spree.

Hughes had a reputation that preceded him. Even notorious outlaws such as Jim Miller preferred not to cross his path. The sheriff of Pecos, Texas, (Bud) Frazer, believed that Jim Miller and his gang were planning to kill him when he got back to Pecos from a business trip. He asked for the protection and help of Hughes. What happened next is chronicled in Leon Claire Metz's book, The Shooters: "Nobody in Pecos, of course, wanted to tangle with Hughes, and a few minutes after the ranger hit town Miller was in jail charged with plotting to commit murder."

== After retirement ==
Following his retirement, western novelist Zane Grey wrote The Lone Star Ranger, dedicated to Hughes and his company of Rangers. A close friend of Hughes, Jack Martin, wrote The Border Boss (1942), telling of his exploits while with the Rangers. Author W. W. Sterling featured Hughes the subject of his book, Trails and Trials of a Texas Ranger, and in addition to those Hughes was included in the books Encyclopedia of Western Gunfighters by Bill O'Neal, and The Law Comes to Texas by Frederick Wilkins. Hughes spent the next several years traveling, ranching and prospecting, before settling in Austin, Texas. There he became the chairman of the board and largest shareholder for Citizens Industrial Bank.

In 1940 he was selected for the Certificate of Valor, a national award that recognized law enforcement officers. Hughes was inducted as a member of the Texas Rangers Hall of Fame.

Hughes had never married. By the 1940s he was in poor health, and most of those closest to him had long since died. Depressed and alone, he moved in with a niece in Austin. On June 3, 1947, he died by suicide at the age of 92. He is buried in the State Cemetery.

== See also ==
- Battle of Tres Jacales
