= Phylon =

Academic journal, founded in 1940

- Discipline: Social science
- Language: English
- Edited by: Obie Clayton

Publication details
- Former name: The Phylon Quarterly
- History: 1940–present
- Publisher: Robert W. Woodruff Library, Atlanta University Center and Clark Atlanta University
- Frequency: Semiannual

Standard abbreviations
- ISO 4: Phylon

Indexing
- ISSN: 0031-8906

Links
- Journal homepage

Phylon (subtitle: the Clark Atlanta University Review of Race and Culture) is a semi-annual peer-reviewed academic journal covering culture in the United States from an African-American perspective. It was established in 1940 by W. E. B. Du Bois, at what was then known as Atlanta University, as a magazine dedicated to race and culture. In 1957, the magazine was renamed The Phylon Quarterly, and in 1960 it was renamed again, this time to its original title.

It resumed publication in 2015 as an online-only journal, as a result of a collaboration between Atlanta University Center and Clark Atlanta University (formerly Atlanta University). The editor-in-chief is Obie Clayton (Clark Atlanta University).

== See also ==
- The Crisis
- Opportunity: A Journal of Negro Life
