= Bob Goss (Texas Ranger) =

Texas Ranger and expert marksman

- Born: July 28, 1898; Honey Grove, Texas, United States
- Died: March 8, 1978 (aged 79); Kilgore, Texas, United States
- Military career
- Branch: Texas Ranger Division
- Service years: Joined in 1924
- Nicknames: "Bob" Goss; "Shadow" Goss
- Other work: Chief of Police, Kilgore
- Police career
- Department: Kilgore Police Department
- Rank: Chief

Robert Gray Goss (July 28, 1898 - March 8, 1978) was a Texas ranger and former Chief of Police in Kilgore, Texas. He served as a machine gunner during World War I. Goss was noted for his expert marksmanship and served during the Texas oil boom.

== Biography ==
"Bob" Goss was born on July 28, 1898, to Acemantha and Joseph Goss in Honey Grove, Texas. He married Juanita Brown, a resident of Honey Grove, in 1921. Their only daughter, Leola, died in infancy.

Goss was a member of the National Rifle Association (NRA) and served as a machine gunner in World War I. At the end of the war, he joined the Texas Ranger Division on June 23, 1924. Goss was tasked with law enforcement in the several oil fields that sprung up after the Texas oil boom. On several assignments, he served alongside Manuel Trazazas "Lonewolf" Gonzaullas, a captain of the Texas Ranger and former superintendent of the Bureau of Intelligence in Texas.

Goss served as Chief of Police in Kilgore, Texas, from 1934 to 1936. He was involved in restoring law and order during significant events such as the 1930 race riot in Sherman, Texas, the Red River Bridge War between Texas and Oklahoma in 1931, and the New London School explosion in 1937.

Goss was an expert marksman and participated in competitive shooting. He was a member of the East Texas Rifle and Pistol Club, practicing target shooting with .45, .38, and .22 caliber weapons. He has often been called the "best pistol shot ever to have worn the Ranger badge".

=== Bonnie and Clyde ===
Goss and a man named Will Fritz arrested Clyde Barrow of the Barrow Gang on February 6, 1934 in East Texas, a few months before Bonnie and Clyde were killed by lawmen in Louisiana.

In his later years, Goss worked for the Texas Game Fish and Oyster Commission. He was inducted into the Texas Ranger Hall of Fame and Museum.

== See also ==
- Texas Ranger Division
