= William M. Tuttle Jr. =

William M. Tuttle Jr. is a professor and author of several books of note on twentieth-century American history and African-American history.

== Early life ==
After graduating from Denison University, Tuttle spent three years in the United States Air Force. He later earned a master's degree and a doctorate from the University of Wisconsin.

== Career ==
Tuttle was a professor at the University of Kansas from 1967 until he retired in 2008, teaching American Studies in the university's Department of History. He was among the founders of the university's branch of the Association for the Study of African American Life and History. Additionally, he has published many scholarly articles and has won several awards, including the H.O.P.E. Teaching Award from the Class of 2001.

In 2018, Denison University awarded Tuttle with an honorary doctorate degree.

== Bibliography ==
Year	Title	Publisher	ISBN
1993	"Daddy's Gone to War": The Second World War in the Lives of America's Children	Oxford University Press	9780199772001
1982	Plain Folk: The Life Stories of Undistinguished Americans (with David M. Katzman)	University of Illinois Press	0252009061
1973	(Editor) W. E. B. Du Bois: Writings by and about W. E. B. Du Bois illuminate his ideals, commitments, and contributions to Black liberation	Prentice-Hall	9780132209055
1970	Race Riot: Chicago in the Red Summer of 1919	University of Illinois Press	9780252065866
