= William J. MacDonald =

William J. MacDonald may refer to:

- William J. Macdonald (filmmaker), American film and television producer and writer
- William James Macdonald (1851–1941), Scottish mathematician and schoolteacher
- William Jesse McDonald (1852–1918), Texas Ranger
- William John Macdonald (1832–1916), Canadian merchant and politician
- William Johnson McDonald (1844–1926), American banker who endowed an astronomical observatory
- William Joseph McDonald (1904–1989), Irish-born bishop of the Catholic Church in the United States
- William Josiah MacDonald (1873–1946), Michigan politician

== See also ==
- William MacDonald (disambiguation)
