= William Macdonald =

William Macdonald or MacDonald or McDonald may refer to:

== Academics ==
- William MacDonald (Christian author) (1917–2007), American Plymouth Brethren scholar and theologian; president of Emmaus Bible College
- William Macdonald (historian) (1863–1938), American journalist and historian
- William Andrew McDonald (1913–2000), American archaeologist
- William Bell Macdonald (1807–1862), Scottish linguist
- William L. MacDonald (1921–2010), American historian of Roman architecture

== Arts and entertainment ==
- Will McDonald (actor), Australian actor
- William Colt MacDonald (1891–1968), American writer of Westerns
- William H. MacDonald (1849–1906), American baritone and actor
- William J. Macdonald (filmmaker) (born 20th century), American film and television producer
- Will Macdonald (born 1966), British television producer, executive and writer

== Law enforcement and military ==
- William MacDonald (RAF officer) (1908–1984), British air marshal
- William Hixon McDonald (senior) (c. 1815–1869), Australian soldier-settler and gold miner
- William Jesse McDonald (1852–1918), Texas Ranger
- William Myron MacDonald (1890–1958), American-born Canadian flying ace
- William Rae Macdonald (1843–1923), Scottish officer of arms

== Politicians ==
- William McDonald (Canadian politician) (1837–1916), from Nova Scotia
- William McDonald (Ontario politician), from Ontario
- William McDonald (Australian politician) (1911–1995), speaker of the Victorian Legislative Assembly
- William MacDonald (New Zealand politician) (1862–1920), cabinet minister and briefly Leader of the Opposition
- William Alexander Macdonald (1860–1946), Canadian politician; from Manitoba
- William Archibald Macdonald (1841–1911), Irish nationalist politician and MP
- William C. McDonald (governor) (1858–1918), American politician; governor of New Mexico
- William Chisholm Macdonald (1890–1946), Liberal Party member of the Canadian House of Commons
- William H. McDonald (1899–1967), American politician; Texas land commissioner
- William John Macdonald (1832–1916), Canadian merchant and politician
- William Josiah MacDonald (1873–1946), American politician; from Michigan
- William Madison McDonald (1866–1950), African-American politician and businessman
- William Ross Macdonald (1891–1976), Canadian lawyer and statesman; from Ontario
- William Walter McDonald (1844–1929), Canadian politician; from the Northwest Territories

== Religious figures ==
- William Macdonald (priest) (1783–1862), British; archdeacon of Wilts
- William Joseph McDonald (1904–1989), Irish-born bishop of the Catholic Church in the United States

== Sports ==
- William MacDonald (footballer) (1911–1978), Scottish footballer and Royal Navy officer
- William Macdonald (jockey) (1800–1856), British; winner of the 1840 Epsom Derby
- William McDonald (bowls) (1885–?), Canadian lawn bowls international
- Will McDonald (basketball) (born 1979), American basketball player
- Will McDonald IV (born 1999), American football player
- Willie McDonald (1905–1979), Scottish footballer
- Willie McDonald (footballer, born 1883) (1883–after 1914), Scottish footballer
- William Macdonald (rugby union) (1861–1941), Scotland international rugby union player

== Others ==
- Will McDonald (journalist) (born 1979), Australian television journalist
- William MacDonald (serial killer) (1924–2015), Australian serial murderer
- William Christopher Macdonald (1831–1917), Canadian tobacco manufacturer and philanthropist
- William Hixon McDonald (junior) (1840–1898), Australian miner, political candidate and pioneer
- William Johnson McDonald (1844–1926), American banker; endowed an astronomical observatory
- William Sutherland Macdonald (1897–1990), Scottish physician; principal medical officer at the Ministry of Health
- William W. McDonald (born 20th century), American rancher and conservationist
- William James Macdonald (1851–1941), Scottish mathematician and schoolteacher

== See also ==
- Bill McDonald (disambiguation)
- Bill MacDonald (disambiguation)
- Bill Macdonald, American sportscaster
