= History of the Texas Ranger Division =

History of the Texas Rangers

The origins of today's Texas Ranger Division trace back to the first days of Anglo-American settlement of what is today the State of Texas, when it was part of the Province of Coahuila y Tejas belonging to the newly independent country of Mexico. The unique characteristics that the Rangers adopted during the force's formative years and that give the division its heritage today—characteristics for which the Texas Rangers would become world-renowned—have been accounted for by the nature of the Rangers' duties, which was to protect a thinly populated frontier against protracted hostilities, first with Plains Natives tribes, and after the Texas Revolution, hostilities with Mexico.

Texas historian T.R. Fehrenbach explains the Rangers' uniqueness:

The Rangers were to be described many times, at first as state troops, later as a police force or constabulary. During most of the 19th century, they were neither. They were apart from the regular army, the militia or national guard, and were never a true police force. They were instead one of the most colorful, efficient, and deadly band of irregular partisans on the side of law and order the world has seen. They were called into being by the needs of a war frontier, by a society that could not afford a regular army. Texans passed in and out of the Rangers regularly; in the early years, a very high proportion of all west Texans served from time to time. If they bore certain similarities to Mamelukes and Cossacks, they were never quite the same.

== Creation and early days ==
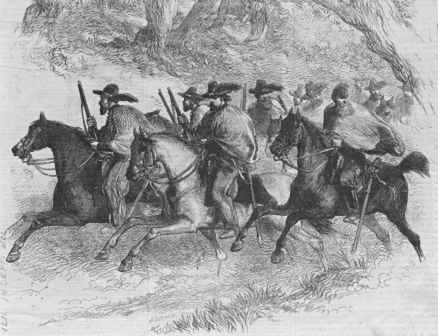
An early depiction of a group of Texas Rangers, c. 1845

By the early 1830s, the Mexican War of Independence had subsided, and some 60 to 70 families had settled in Texas—most of them from the United States. Because there was no regular army to protect the citizens against attacks by native tribes and bandits, in 1823, Stephen F. Austin organized small, informal armed groups whose duties required them to range over the countryside, and who thus came to be known as "rangers". Around August 4, 1823, Austin wrote that he would " ... employ ten men ... to act as rangers for the common defense ... the wages I will give said ten men is fifteen dollars a month payable in property ... " John Jackson Tumlinson Sr., the first alcalde of the Colorado district, is considered by many historians of the Texas Rangers to be the first killed in the line of duty. While there is some discussion as to when Austin actually employed men as "rangers", Texas Ranger lore dates the anniversary year of their organization to this event.

However, the Texas Rangers were not formally constituted until 1835. Austin returned to Texas after having been imprisoned in Mexico City and helped organize a council to govern the group. On October 17, at a consultation of the Provisional Government of Texas, Daniel Parker proposed a resolution to establish the Texas Rangers. He proposed creating three companies that would total some 60 men and would be known by "uniforms" consisting of a light duster and an identification badge made from a Mexican peso. They were instituted by Texan lawmakers on November 24. On November 28, 1835, Robert McAlpin Williamson was chosen to be the first Major of the Texas Rangers. Within two years the Rangers grew to more than 300 men.

In their early days, Rangers performed tasks of protecting the Texas frontier against Native Americans’ attacks on the settlers. During the Texas Revolution, they served mainly as scouts, spies, couriers, and guides for the settlers fleeing before the Mexican Army and performed rear guard during the Runaway Scrape and general support duties. These minor roles continued after independence, when the region became the Republic of Texas under President Sam Houston. Houston, who had lived with the Cherokee for many years (and who had taken a Cherokee wife), favored peaceful coexistence with Natives, a policy that left little space for a force with the Rangers' characteristics.

This situation changed radically when Mirabeau B. Lamar became president of the Republic of Texas in December 1838. Lamar had participated in skirmishes with the Cherokee in his home state of Georgia; like most Texians, he had not forgotten the support the Cherokee had given the Mexicans in the Córdova Rebellion against the Republic. He favored the eradication of Native Americans in Texas—a view that he shared with Chief Justice of the Supreme Court Thomas Rusk. Lamar saw in the Rangers the perfect tool for the task, and he obtained permission from the Texas Legislature to raise a force of 56 Rangers, along with other volunteer companies. During the following three years, he engaged the Rangers in a war against the Cherokee and the Comanche and succeeded in weakening their territorial control.

== Mexican–American War ==
Sam Houston was re-elected President of Texas on December 12, 1841. He had taken note of the Rangers' cost-efficiency and increased their number to 150. Under Captain John Coffee "Jack" Hays' leadership, the force played an important role in the defense against the Mexican invasion led by General Adrian Woll in 1842 and against attacks by Natives. The First Regiment of Texas Mounted Rifle Volunteers was also known as "Hays' Texas Rangers". Despite his youth at the time, the charismatic Hays was a rallying figure to his men and is often considered responsible for giving cohesion, discipline and a group mentality to the Rangers. Flacco, a chief of the allied Native tribe of the Lipan, used to call Hays Bravo too much. The adoption of the state-of-the-art five-shot Colt Paterson revolver (which had been turned down by the U.S. Army) was also his work. Hays trained his men to aim, fire and reload their weapons from horseback, a radical innovation from the usual contemporary technique of dismounting before shooting at enemies and reloading, which was a necessity with more cumbersome weaponry. This tactic was put to devastating effect, and it was imitated shortly afterwards by the military, Texian and American. At the suggestion of one of Hays's officers, Samuel Hamilton Walker, these revolvers soon evolved into the famous, enhanced six-shot version, the Walker Colt; 1,000 of these revolvers were issued to the United States Mounted Rifles engaged in the Mexican–American War. During these years, famous Rangers such as Hays, Walker, Benjamin McCulloch and William "Bigfoot" Wallace first established their reputation as frontier fighters.

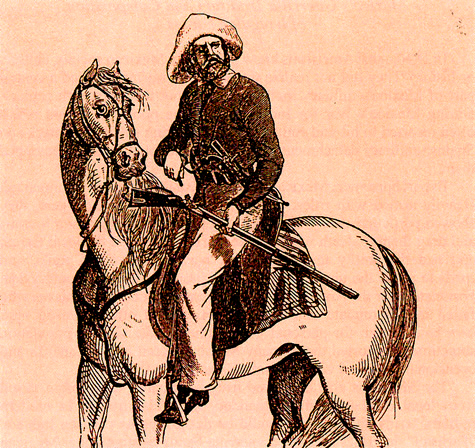
Texas Ranger on horseback, ca. 1846.

With the annexation of Texas within the United States and the Mexican–American War in 1846, several companies of Rangers were mustered into federal service and proved themselves at the battles of Palo Alto and Resaca de la Palma. From that moment on, their effectiveness as guerrilla fighters and guides to the federal army through a territory that they were familiar with marked the pace of the American offensive. Rangers played an important role in the battles of Monterrey and Buena Vista. The army, commanded by General Winfield Scott, landed at Veracruz in March 1847, and the Rangers once again provided valuable support at the ensuing Siege of Veracruz and the battles of Cerro Gordo and Chapultepec. They were also responsible for the defeat of the fierce Mexican guerrilleros that hindered the advance of the federal troops, which they achieved ruthlessly and efficiently. By then, the Rangers had earned themselves a considerable reputation that approached the legendary among Mexicans, and when Ranger companies entered and occupied Mexico City with the U.S. Army in September 1847, los Diablos Tejanos (the "Texas Devils") were received with reverence and fear. Their role in the Mexican–American War also won them nationwide fame in the United States, and news of their exploits in the contemporary press became common, effectively establishing the Rangers as part of American folklore. As the Victoria Advocate reported in the November 16, 1848, issue:

Four newly raised ranging companies, have all been organized, and taken their several stations on our frontier. We are much pleased. We know they are true men, and they know exactly what they are about. With many of them, Native and Mexican fighting has been their trade for years. That they may be permanently retained in the service on our frontier is extremely desirable, and we cannot permit ourselves to doubt such will be the case.

Despite these popular stories and their fame, some of their most brutal interventions, such as the massacre of unarmed civilians, elderly men, women and children in Saltillo, ordered by Samuel H. Walker, remained unknown to the American public at large. Most of the Ranger force was disbanded during the years following the end of the Mexican–American War on February 2, 1848, since the protection of the frontiers was now an official duty of the U.S. Army. But as more settlers sought to establish homesteads in lands traditionally occupied by Natives, the skirmishes with the native peoples became a major political issue. During the 1850s, the Rangers were intermittently called on to deal with this problem, and with the election of Hardin Richard Runnels as governor in 1857, they once again regained their role as defenders of the Texas frontier.

On January 27, 1858, Runnels allocated US$70,000 (equivalent to $2.6 million in 2025) to fund a force of Rangers, and John Salmon "Rip" Ford, a veteran Ranger of the war with Mexico, was commissioned as senior captain. With a force of some 100 Rangers, Ford began a large expedition against the Comanche and other tribes, whose raids against the settlers and their properties had become common. On May 12, Ford's Rangers, accompanied by Tonkawa, Anadarko and Shawnee scouts from the Brazos Reservation in Texas, crossed the Red River into Native Territory and attacked a Comanche village in the Canadian River Valley, flanked by the Antelope Hills in what is now Oklahoma. Suffering only four casualties, the force killed a reported 76 Comanche (including a chief by the name of Iron Jacket) and took 18 prisoners and 300 horses.

In December 1859, Ford and his company were assigned to Brownsville, in south Texas, where the local Mexican rancher Juan Cortina had launched an attack and briefly occupied the town and later conducted a series of guerrilla actions and raids against local American landowners. Together with a regiment of the U.S. Army commanded by Major Samuel P. Heintzelman (who later became a notable general of the Union in the Civil War), Ford's Rangers took part in the Cortina War, and on December 27, 1859, they engaged and defeated Cortina's forces in the battle of Rio Grande City. Pursued and defeated by Ford and his Rangers again a few days later, Cortina retreated into Mexico, and although he would continue to promote minor actions against the Texan ranchers, the threat of a large-scale military incursion was effectively ended.

The success of these campaigns marked a turning point in the history of the Texas Rangers. The U.S. Army could provide only limited and thinly stretched protection in the vast territory of Texas. In contrast, the Rangers' effectiveness in dealing with these threats convinced both the people of the state and the political leaders that a well-funded and organized local Ranger force was essential. Such a force leverage its deep familiarity with the territory and its proximity to the theater of operations as significant advantages.

Despite this recognition, the option of maintaining the Rangers was not pursued due to emerging national political problems, leading to their dissolution until 1874. However, the conviction of their usefulness had become firmly established, and the agency was eventually reconstituted.

== Civil War and late 19th century ==
After Texas seceded from the United States in 1861 during the American Civil War, many Rangers enlisted individually to fight for the Confederacy, such as Walter P. Lane, George W. Baylor, Thomas S. Lubbock, Benjamin McCulloch, Henry Eustace McCulloch, John B. Jones, Leander H. McNelly and John Ford. Although the famous Eighth Texas Cavalry regiment was widely known as Terry's Texas Rangers, neither its leader and founder, Benjamin Franklin Terry, nor the majority of its members had been affiliated with the state agency. The fact that both groups have often been regarded as related (and Terry's men themselves had thus adopted the organization's name) speaks of the widespread fame that the Rangers had achieved by that time. During the Civil War, the duties of scouting the state frontiers for Union troops, hostile Natives and deserters devolved upon those who could not be drafted into the Confederate Army because of their age or other disabilities. This mixed group was never officially considered a Ranger force, although their work was essentially the same. In April 1865 General John A. Wharton of the "Terry's Texas Rangers" was shot and killed after an argument with George W. Baylor-who served in the Texas Rangers Frontier Battalion after the Civil War until 1882.

During Reconstruction, the Rangers were replaced by a Union-controlled version of the Rangers aka the Texas State Police. Charged with enforcing unpopular new laws that came with reintegration, that organization fell into disrepute. The TSP only existed from July 22, 1870 to April 22, 1873.

The scenario changed radically for the Rangers with the state election of 1873. When newly elected Governor Richard Coke took office in January 1874, it marked the end of Reconstruction for the Lone Star State, and he vigorously restored order to Texas in pursuit of improvements to both the economy and security. Once again Natives and Mexican bandits were threatening the frontiers, and once again the Rangers were tasked with solving the problem. That same year, the state legislature authorized the recommissioning of the Rangers, and a special force was created within its aegis: the Frontier Battalion, consisting of six companies of 75 men each under the command of Major John B. Jones. This group played a major role in the control of ordinary criminals as well as the defense against hostile Native tribes, which was particularly necessary in the period of lawlessness and social collapse of the Reconstruction.

The Frontier Battalion was soon augmented with the Special Force, a second military group of 40 men under Captain Leander H. McNelly, with the specific task of bringing order in the area of south Texas between the Nueces River and the Rio Grande, called the Nueces Strip. At this particular region, the general situation of lawlessness was aggravated by the proximity of Texas to Mexico and the conflict between agrarian and cattle interests. Raids along the frontier were common, and not only perpetrated by ordinary bandits but also promoted by local Mexican caudillos. In particular, Juan Cortina's men were again conducting periodic guerrilla operations against local ranchers. In the following two years, McNelly and his group energetically engaged these threats and virtually eradicated them. A second sergeant of J. R. Waller's Company "A" was Dallas Stoudenmire, later El Paso Police Chief and Deputy U.S. Marshal.

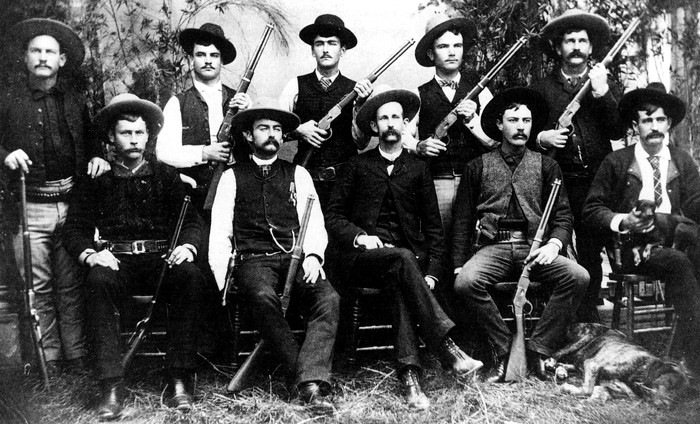
Members of the Frontier Battalion, a company of Texas Rangers, ca. 1885

It was at these times that many of the Rangers' myths were born, such as their success in capturing or killing notorious criminals and desperados (including bank robber Sam Bass and gunfighter John Wesley Hardin) and their decisive role in the defeat of the Comanche, the Kiowa and the Apache peoples. It was also during these years that the Rangers suffered the only defeat in their history when they surrendered at the Salinero Revolt in 1877. Despite the fame of their deeds, the conduct of the Rangers during this period was questionable. In particular, McNelly and his men used ruthless methods that often rivaled the brutality of their opponents, such as taking part in summary executions and confessions induced by torture and intimidation. McNelly also made himself famous for disobeying direct orders from his superiors on several occasions, and breaking through the Mexican frontier for self-appointed law enforcement purposes. Arguably, these methods either sowed the seeds of discontent among Mexican-Americans or restored order to the frontier. After McNelly's retirement because of health problems, the Special Force was dissolved in 1877 and their members absorbed into the Frontier Battalion, which continued to function even after Jones's death in the line of duty in 1881. By the last years of the 19th century, a high measure of security within the vast frontier of Texas had been achieved, in which the Rangers had played a primary role.

== Taft-Diaz assassination attempt ==
In 1909, Private C.R. Moore of Company A, "performed one of the most important feats in the history of the Texas Rangers". William Howard Taft and Porfirio Díaz planned a summit in El Paso, Texas, and Ciudad Juárez, Mexico, an historic first meeting between a U.S. president and a Mexican president and also the first time an American president would cross the border into Mexico However, tensions rose on both sides of the border, including threats of assassination. As a result, the Texas Rangers, 4,000 U.S. and Mexican troops, U.S. Secret Service agents and U.S. marshals were all called in to provide security. Frederick Russell Burnham, the celebrated scout, was put in charge of a 250-private security detail hired by John Hays Hammond, a nephew of Texas Ranger John Coffee Hays, who in addition to owning large investments in Mexico was a close friend of Taft from Yale and a U.S. Vice-Presidential candidate in 1908.

On October 16, the day of the summit, Burnham and Private C.R. Moore discovered a man holding a concealed palm pistol standing at the El Paso Chamber of Commerce building along the procession route. Burnham and Moore captured, disarmed, and arrested the assassin within only a few feet of Taft and Díaz.

== Mexican Revolution and early 20th century ==
At the beginning of the 20th century, Texas's frontiers had become more settled, thus rendering the 1874 legislation obsolete after the organization had existed as a quasi-military force for more than 25 years. Amidst serious legal troubles that questioned the authority of the Rangers to exert such a role, new resolutions appropriate to the current times were adopted. The Frontier Battalion was disbanded with the passing of new legislation on July 8, 1901, and a new Ranger force was created, consisting of four companies of "no more than 20 men each" with a captain in command of every unit. The Rangers had evolved into an agency with an exclusive law enforcement focus.

The Mexican Revolution that began in 1910 against Mexican President Díaz changed the relatively peaceful state of affairs along the border. Soon after, violence on both sides of the frontier escalated as bands of Mexicans took over border towns and began crossing the Rio Grande on a near-daily basis. Taking over trade routes in Mexico by establishing themselves as road agents, Mexican banditos turned towards attacking the American communities for kidnapping, extortion, and supplies. As Mexican law enforcement disintegrated with the collapse of the Diaz regime, these gangs grouped themselves under the various caudillos on both sides of the border and took sides in the civil war, most simply to take advantage of the turmoil to loot. As the lack of American ability to defend its southern border became more apparent, the scope of these activities turned to outright genocide with the intention of driving Americans out of the Southwest entirely; this became known as the Plan de San Diego in 1915. In several well-rehearsed attacks, Mexicans rose up and in conjunction with raiding Villista guerrillas, within weeks had killed over 500 Texan women, children, and men.

The Texans were determined to restore control and order by any means necessary. As Governor Oscar Branch Colquitt instructed Ranger Captain John R. Hughes, " ... you and your men are to keep Mexican raiders off of Texas territory if possible, and if they invade the State let them understand they do so at the risk of their lives." Hundreds of new special Rangers were appointed by order of the state, which neglected to carefully screen aspiring members. Rather than conduct themselves as law enforcement officers, many of these groups acted more like vigilante squads. Reports of Rangers abusing their authority and breaking the law themselves increased.

The Rangers used censorship and murder to suppress political dissent. In 1914 Rangers destroyed a printing press and arrested journalists at El Progreso, a newspaper in Laredo, because the newspaper had criticized the United States occupation of Veracruz. Rangers feared an uprising by non-white people in Texas because of the Plan of San Diego, a 1915 document calling for a racial utopia and secession from the US. They executed Mexicans and Tejanos at various locations around the state, and left their bodies on display as a warning, including 12 hangings in Hidalgo County in September 1915.

The situation grew even more dramatic when on March 9, 1916, Pancho Villa led 500 Mexican raiders in a cross-border attack against Columbus, New Mexico, increasing the high tension that had already existed between the communities. Villa and General Ramon Banda Quesada, in an attack against the town that was garrisoned by a detachment of the 13th Cavalry Regiment, seized 100 horses and mules, burned the town, killed 14 soldiers and 10 residents, and took ammunition and weaponry before retreating back into Mexico. Quesada had five men captured and suffered the loss of 80 dead or mortally wounded, mostly from the U.S. machine-gun emplacements.

The final straw was the Porvenir Massacre, involving the killing of innocent villagers wrongly accused of raiding the Brite Ranch Store on Christmas Day in 1917. In January 1918 a heavily armed group of Texas Rangers, ranchmen and members a troop of U.S. Cavalry descended upon the tiny community of Porvenir, Texas on the Mexican border in western Presidio County. The Rangers and company rounded up the inhabitants of the village and searched their homes. They then proceeded to gather all the men in Porvenir (fifteen Mexican men and boys ranging in age from 16 to 72 years) and march them off into the darkness. A short distance from Porvenir, the men were lined up against a rock bluff and shot to death.

Before the decade was over, thousands of lives were lost, Texans and Mexicans alike. In January 1919, at the initiative of Representative José T. Canales of Brownsville, the Texas Legislature launched a full investigation of Rangers' actions throughout these years. The investigation found that from 300 up to 5,000 people, mostly of Hispanic descent, had been killed by Rangers from 1910 to 1919, and that members of the Rangers had been involved in many acts of brutality and injustice.

These were the most turbulent times in the history of the Rangers, and with the objective of recycling the force's membership, putting it back in tune with its past and restoring the public's trust, the Legislature passed on March 31, 1919, a resolution to purge it and enhance it and its procedures. All special Ranger groups were disbanded; the four official companies were kept, albeit their members were reduced from 20 to 15 each; better payment was offered in order to attract men of higher personal standards; and a method for citizens to articulate complaints against any further misdeeds or abuses was established.

The reforms proved positive, and the new Ranger force eventually regained the status of a respectable agency. Under the command of captains such as Frank Hamer (who later became famous for leading the party that killed the outlaws Bonnie and Clyde), the Rangers displayed remarkable activity in the following years, including the continuous fighting of cattle rustlers, intervening in the violent labor disputes of the time and protecting the citizenry involved in the Ku Klux Klan's public displays from violent mob reaction. With the passage of the Volstead Act and the beginning of nationwide prohibition on January 16, 1920, their duties extended to scouting the border for liquor smugglers and detecting and dismantling the illegal stills that abounded within Texas.

One of the Rangers' highest-profile interventions during this period was taming Texas's oil boomtowns, which had developed into lawless territories. During the 1920s, martial law was decreed on several of these towns, such as Mexia and Borger; at others, like Desdemona, Wink, Ranger, Kilgore and Burkburnett, the situation was also very serious, and the Rangers were called in to quell agitated locals and terminate all illegal activities. This trouble continued until well in the 1950s, but the Rangers prevented it from growing into an even more dramatic problem. At Borger, a total of ten officers were sent on April 7, 1927, including Captain Hamer. The balance of the Rangers' activities upon their arrival as reported was:

A thorough-going clean-up was put underway. The liquor traffic was broken up, many stills being seized and destroyed, and several thousand gallons of whiskey being captured and poured out. Two hundred and three gambling slot machines were seized and destroyed, and in a period of twenty-four hours, no less than twelve hundred prostitutes left the town of Borger.

== Modernization and present day ==
The Great Depression forced both the federal and state governments to cut down on personnel and funding of their organizations, and the Rangers were no exception. The number of commissioned officers was reduced to 45, and the only means of transportation afforded to Rangers were free railroad passes, or using their personal horses. The situation worsened for the agency when its members entangled themselves in politics in 1932 by publicly supporting Governor Ross Sterling in his re-election campaign, over his opponent Miriam Amanda "Ma" Ferguson. Ferguson was elected, and immediately after taking office in January 1933, she proceeded to discharge all serving Rangers. The force also saw its salaries and funds slashed by the Texas Legislature, and their numbers reduced further to 32 men. The result was that Texas became a safe hideout for the many Depression-era gangsters escaping from the law, such as Bonnie and Clyde, George "Machine Gun" Kelly, Pretty Boy Floyd and Raymond Hamilton. The hasty appointment of many unqualified Rangers to stop the increasing criminality proved ineffective.

The general disorganization of law enforcement in the state convinced the members of the Legislature that a thorough revision of the public security system was in order, and with that purpose it hired the services of a consulting firm from Chicago. The resulting report yielded many worrying conclusions, but the basic underlying facts were simple: the criminality levels in Texas were extremely high, and the state's means to fight them were underfunded, undermanned, loose, disorganized and obsolete. The consultants' recommendation, besides increasing funding, was to introduce a whole reorganization of state security agencies; especially, to merge the Rangers with the Texas Highway Patrol under a new agency called the Texas Department of Public Safety (DPS). After deliberating, the Legislature agreed with the suggestion. The resolution that created the new state law enforcement agency was passed in 1935, and with an initial budget of $450,000, the DPS became operational on August 10.

With minor rearrangements over the years, the 1935 reforms have ruled the Texas Rangers' organization until present day. Hiring new members, which had been largely a political decision, was achieved through a series of examinations and merit evaluations. Promotion relied on seniority and performance in the line of duty. More sophisticated means of crime fighting were put at their disposal, like automobiles, advanced weaponry and forensics. By the late 1930s, the Rangers had one of the best crime labs in the United States at the Headquarters Division in Austin. The appointment of Colonel Homer Garrison in September 1938 as director of the DPS proved decisive as well. Under his leadership, many respected captains such as Manuel T. Gonzaullas worked extensively to restore the good name of the force that had been compromised in the previous decades, keeping it in line with its traditions within a modern and civilized society and regaining its high status. The number of commissioned officers grew and the Rangers developed a clear detective function, while the Highway Patrol took charge of direct law enforcement duties.

The quality of the force in terms of training, funding, modernization and number strength has continued to improve. In the last few decades, the Rangers have intervened in several thousand cases with a high level of effectiveness, including many high-profile ones such as the pursuit and capture of serial killer Ángel Maturino Reséndiz. The agency is also fully integrated with modern Texan ethnic groups, counting numerous officers of Hispanic and African American origin among its members. Today, the historical importance and symbolism of the Texas Rangers is such that they are protected by statute from being disbanded.

== Notable Texas Rangers ==
John Barclay Armstrong

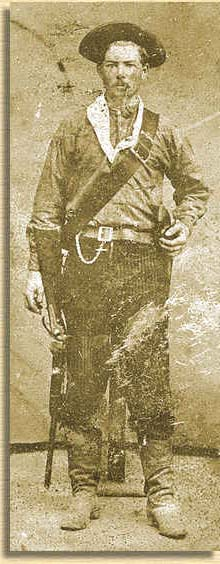
William Callicot

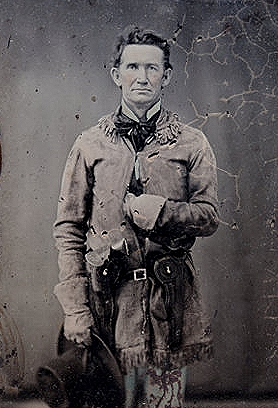
John Salmon "Rip" Ford

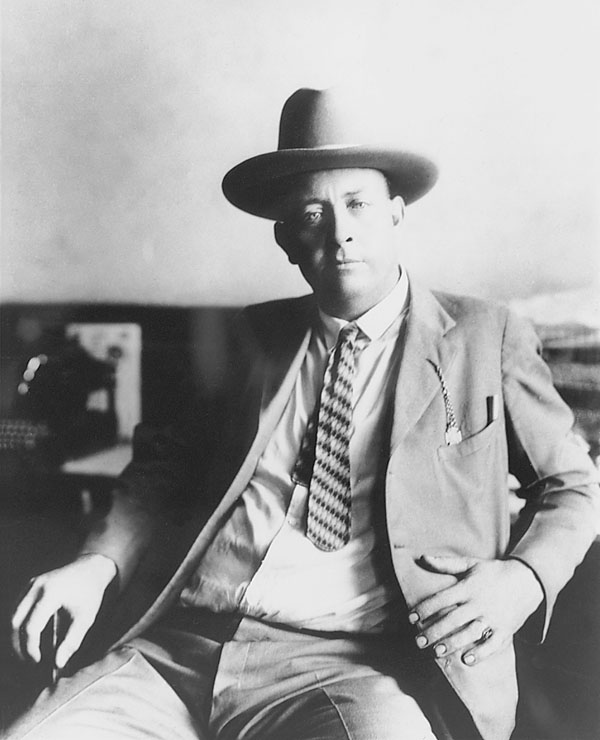
Frank Hamer

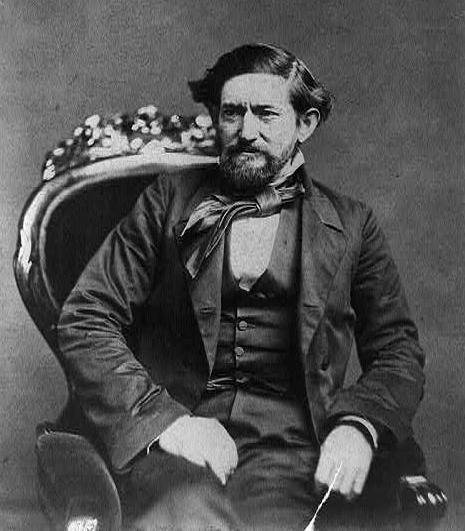
John Coffee "Jack" Hays

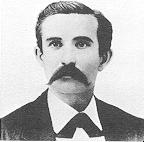
John B. Jones

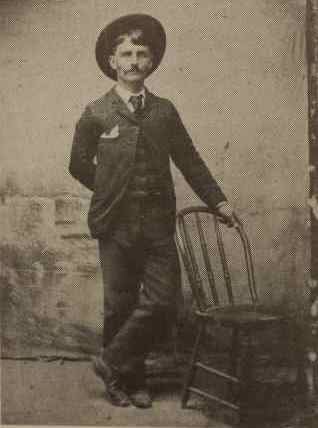
Robert Kinghorn

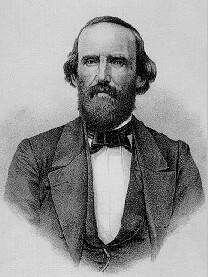
Benjamin McCulloch

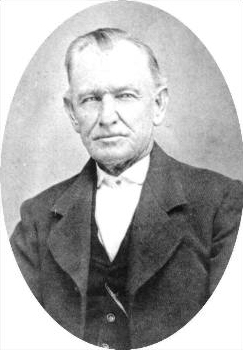
Henry Eustace McCulloch

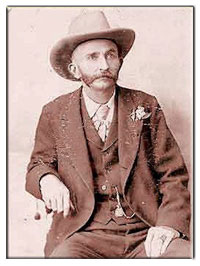
Bill McDonald

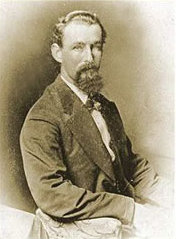
Leander H. McNelly

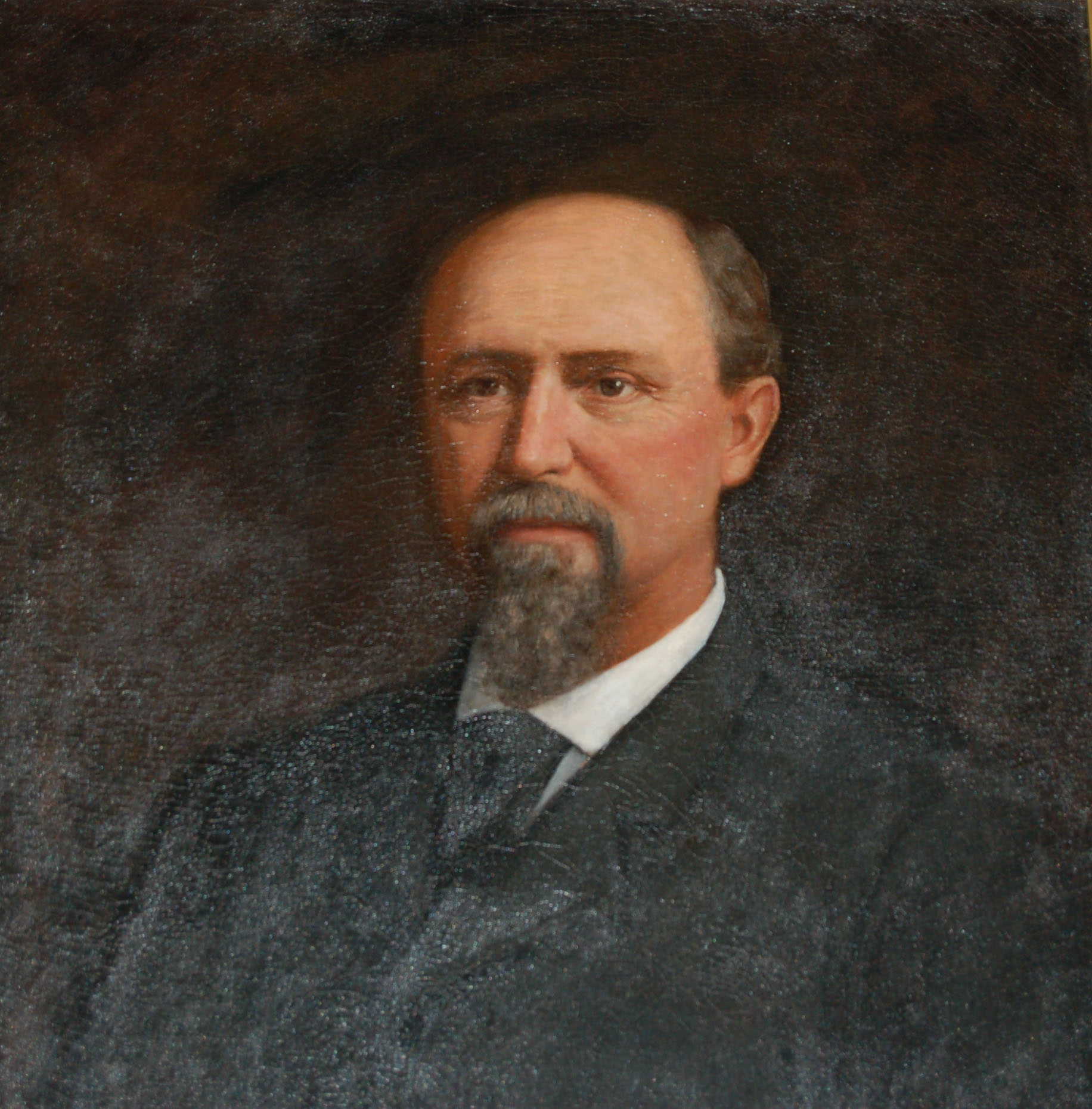
Lawrence Sullivan "Sul" Ross

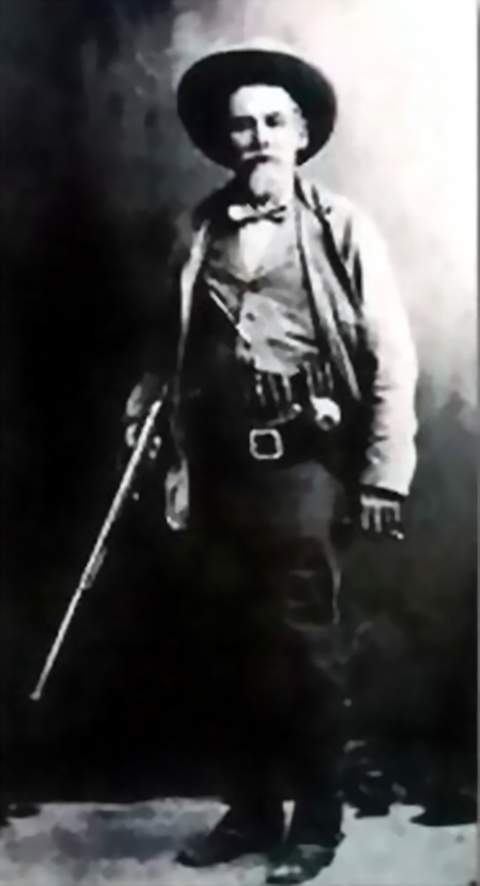
John Horton "Texas John" Slaughter

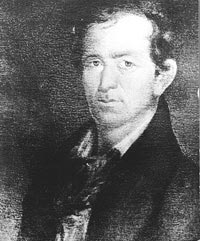
Erastus "Deaf" Smith

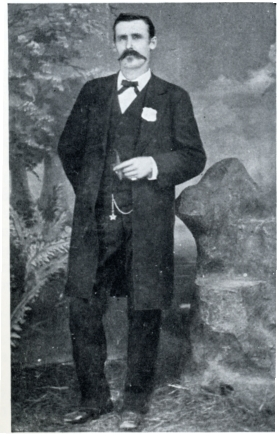
Dallas Stoudenmire

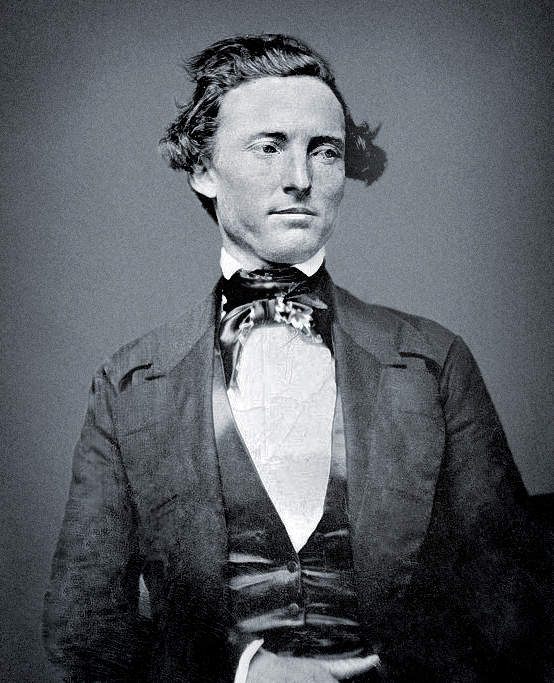
Samuel Hamilton Walker

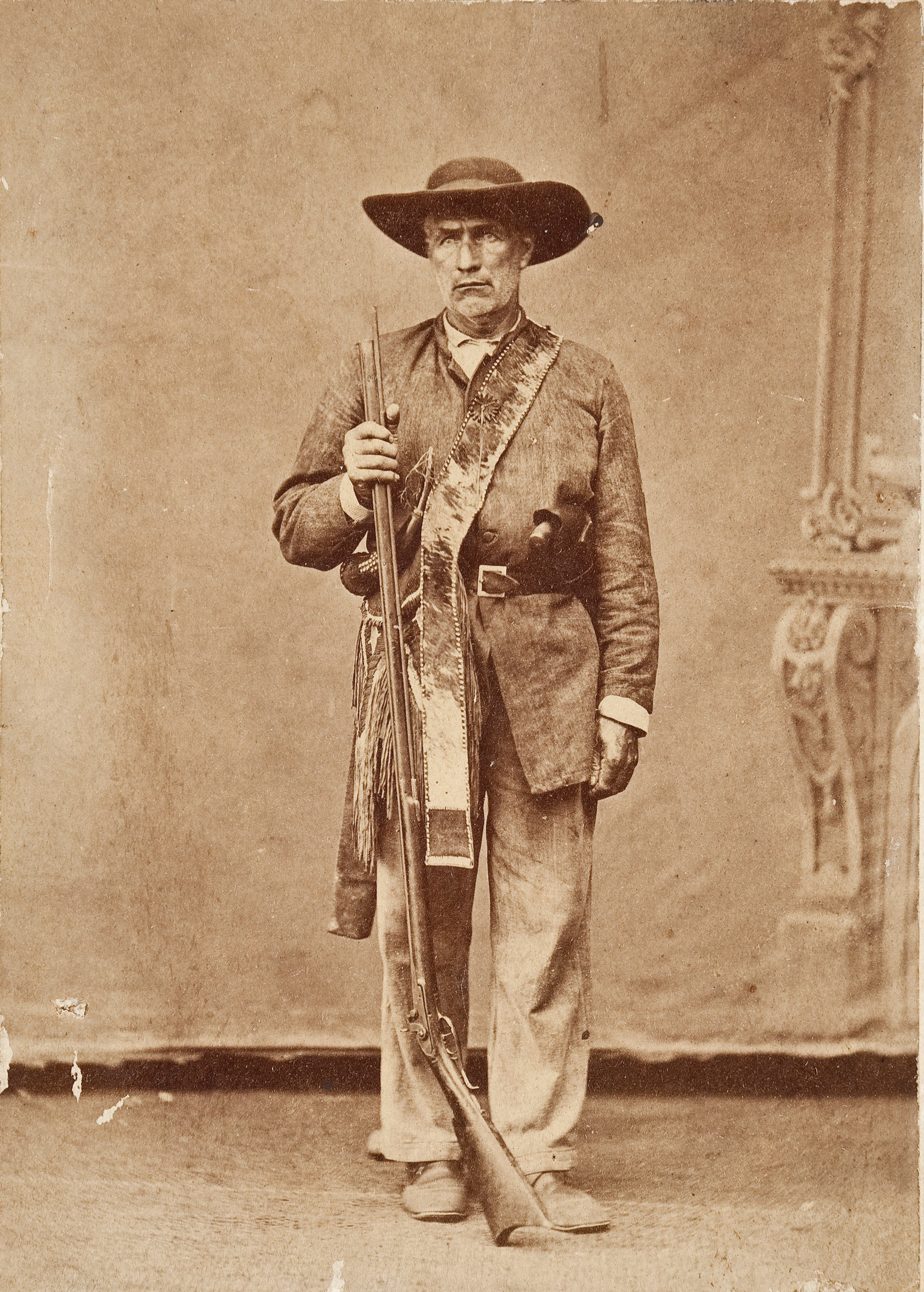
William A. A. "Bigfoot" Wallace

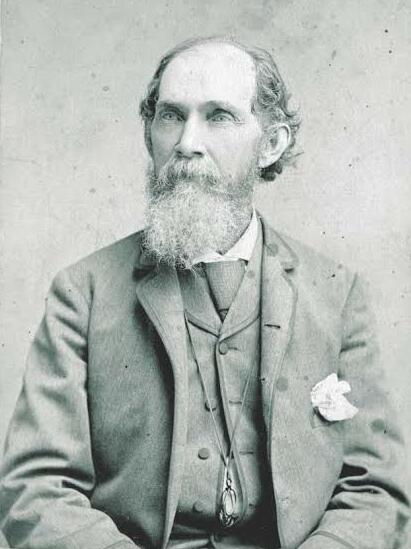
George Wythe Baylor

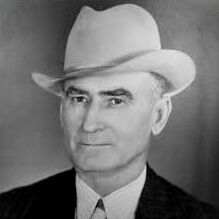
Benjamin Maney Gault (1886–1947)

== See also ==
- History of Texas
- La Matanza (1910–1920)
- Texas Ranger Division
