= Billy MacDonald =

Billy MacDonald may refer to:

- Billy MacDonald (footballer, born 1877) (1877–1966), Scottish footballer
- Billy Macdonald (footballer, born 1976), Scottish footballer
- Billy McDonald (footballer, born 1892) (1892–1948), English footballer

== See also ==
- William Macdonald (disambiguation)
