= Bill McDonald =

Bill McDonald may refer to:

- Bill McDonald (actor) in Ollie Hopnoodle's Haven of Bliss and A History of Violence
- Bill McDonald (American journalist), American journalist and editor for The New York Times
- Bill McDonald (Australian journalist) (born 1967), Australian journalist and news presenter
- Bill McDonald (basketball) (1916–1994), American professional basketball player
- William Jesse McDonald (1852–1918), often called "Bill McDonald", Texas Ranger and bodyguard for U.S. Presidents Theodore Roosevelt and Woodrow Wilson

== See also ==
- William Macdonald (disambiguation)
- Bill MacDonald (disambiguation)
- Bill Macdonald, sportscaster
- Bill Macdonald (baseball) (1929–1991), American professional baseball player
