= Bill MacDonald =

Bill MacDonald or Macdonald may refer to:

- Bill Macdonald (fl. 1980s–2010s), American sportscaster
- Bill MacDonald, actor featured in Paradise Falls, Mercy, The Corruptor, Ruby and the Well, etc.
- Bill Macdonald (baseball) (1929–1991), American baseball player
- Bill MacDonald (footballer) (1906–1973), Australian footballer
- Bill MacDonald (Canadian politician), member of the Nova Scotia House of Assembly, Canada
- Bill MacDonald (Ontario politician), Ontario Liberal Party politician, Ontario, Canada
- Bill MacDonald (wrestler) (c. 1920/21–1964), Scottish wrestling champion

== See also ==
- Bill McDonald (disambiguation)
- William MacDonald (disambiguation)
