= Stanley Osborne Welch =

American politician and judge (1846–1906)

Personal details
- Born: June 6, 1846 New Orleans, Louisiana, US
- Died: November 6, 1906 (aged 60) Rio Grande City, Texas, US
- Party: Democratic
- Children: 6
- Occupation: Politician, judge

Military service
- Allegiance: Confederate States of America
- Branch/service: Confederate States Army
- Battles/wars: American Civil War

Stanley Osborne Welch (June 6, 1846 – November 6, 1906) was an American politician and judge. A Democrat, he was assassinated.

== Early life and career ==
Welch was born on June 6, 1846, in New Orleans. During the American Civil War, he served in the Confederate States Army. He later moved to San Antonio, working as a teller at the San Antonio National Bank. He lived in Austin during the Governorship of Edmund J. Davis. He then returned to San Antonio, becoming editor of the San Antonio Express-News. On July 4, 1876, he lost his arm during an artillery salute. He then moved to Corpus Christi, establishing a law partnership with John McCampbell. A strong orator, he was known as the "silver-tongued orator of Southwest Texas".

Welch was a Democrat. He was elected district attorney of Nueces County, afterwards becoming city attorney of Corpus Christi. In 1898, he was elected judge of the South Texas Trans-Nueces Region judicial district, being re-elected twice. On April 25, 1904, he oversaw the murder trial of Gregorio Cortez, who murdered Sheriff W. T. Morris. In a municipal election, he was accused of endorsing Democrats over Republicans.

== Personal life and death ==
In 1884, Welch married Azalie F. Brewster, with whom he had a child. In 1889, he married Georgia Welch, with whom he had five children. He was a member of the Knights of Pythias. On November 6, 1906, aged 60 he was assassinated at Rio Grande City, and was buried at the New Bay Cemetery, in Corpus Christi. In November, officer William Jesse McDonald and others were investigating his murder, for which they were ambushed. In 1908, Alberto Cabrera, a resident of Starr County, was convicted of the murder.
