= Frontier Battalion =

Military unit

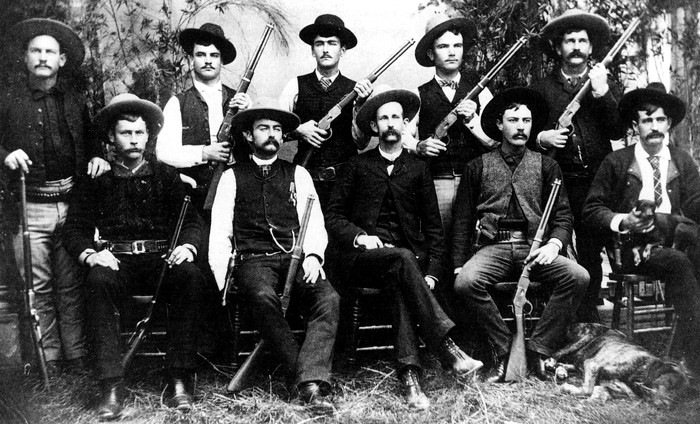
- Rangers of the Frontier Battalion, c. 1885.
- Active: 1874–1901
- Disbanded: July 8, 1901
- Country: United States
- Allegiance: Texas
- Type: Rangers
- Size: Battalion
- Engagements: Texas-Indian Wars; Mason County War; Horrell-Higgins Feud; San Elizario Salt War; Battle of Tres Jacales; Fence Cutting Wars; Texas range wars

Commanders
- Notable commanders: John B. Jones

The Frontier Battalion was the first permanent Texas Ranger force in history. It was established in 1874 after governor Richard Coke recommended that the legislature organize a force to protect the lawless Texas frontier. The battalion comprised six companies of rangers of seventy-five men each, and was led by Major John B. Jones.

== Establishment ==
By the end of the civil war order on the Texas frontier was near nonexistent, the Comanches and Kiowas had rolled back the line of settlement a hundred miles in some places and drove off most of the pioneer population in many counties, Mexican bandits pillaged along the Rio Grande, and gangs of roaming criminals contributed to a crime spree that the state had no means to respond to. By 1866 a new line of federal forts had been established, but raids and lawlessness remained a major issue for the next decade despite the efforts of the authorities.

In 1874 the legislature authorized two groups designed to combat this emergency. The first was the Special Force under Captain Leander H. McNelly who were sent to south Texas to curb lawlessness. The second was the Frontier Battalion, whose job was solely focused on combating Indians and Criminals on the frontier.

== Early history ==
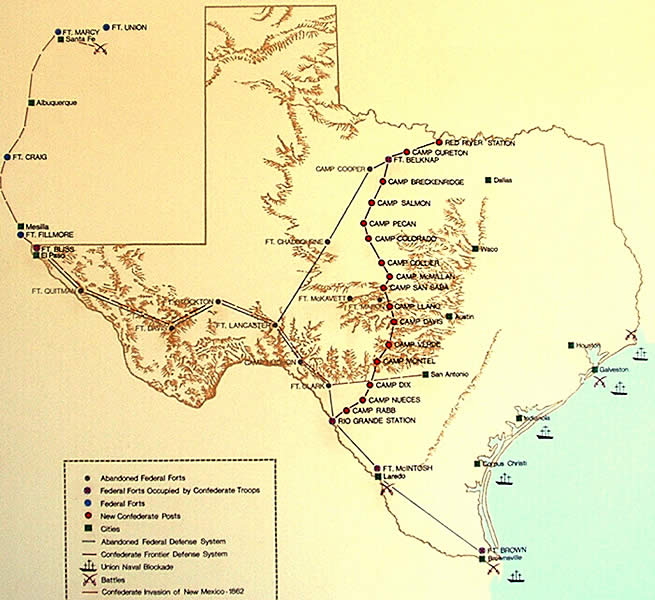
The approximate line of settlement in 1874 when the battalion was established.

On May 2, 1874, John B. Jones was commissioned major of the battalion and by July 10, 1874, all six companies (of seventy-five Rangers each) had been mustered into service, and additional forts established along the line of settlement connected by a series of couriers who would ride between forts relaying information and picking up signals of incoming Indian attacks.

After only a year and half of service and after twenty-one fights with Indians, the attacks on frontier towns became rarer to the point the battalion became primarily focused on combating crime, mostly that of lawbreakers who had risen up during the social collapse and frequent crime sprees that followed the Civil War. Another common source of crime was the frequent range wars that sprung up due to the encroachment of farmland into cattle ranching territory. Men of the battalion during this time made arrests, helped escort prisoners, guarded jails, and attended courts in order to ensure justice was served; because of their efforts hundreds of lawless men (including Sam Bass) were arrested and thousands more fled.

== Decline ==
In 1881 the Battalion's longtime major, John B. Jones, died in Austin. Following his death the principal captains of the battalion also resigned their posts. In addition; the fact that they had been so successful in their duties from the 1874-1882 period meant that most high-profile crime in the state had disappeared, which meant the battalion was no longer necessary. For the next two decades the Rangers occasionally intercepted Mexican and Indian bandits along the Rio Grande, contended with cattle thieves, and at times protected Black Texans from White lynch mobs.

By 1900 such relative inactivity emboldened critics to call for the disbandment of the entire ranger system. Though the rangers themselves were not scrapped, the battalion met its end in 1900 when a court ruling allowed only commissioned officers to execute criminals or make arrests. In 1901, the legislature cut the force to four companies, each headed by a captain who couldn't recruit more than twenty men; which effectively ended the battalion.
