= Las Cuevas War =

Brief 1875 Mexican-American armed conflict

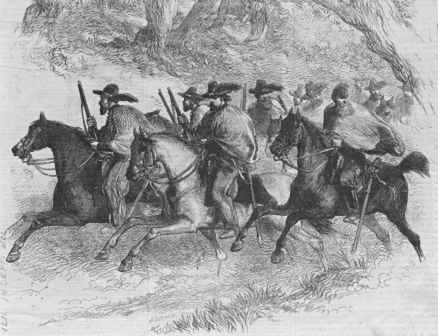
- Texas Rangers
Date	November 20–21, 1875
Location	Tamaulipas, Mexico; Texas, United States
Result	American victory; Cattle returned to Texas

Belligerents
United States	Mexican bandits

Commanders and leaders
Leander McNelly	Juan Flores Salinas †

Strength
Unknown number of Texas Rangers and U.S. Army	~400 irregular militia

Casualties and losses
Unknown	~80 killed

The Las Cuevas War was a brief armed conflict fought mainly between a force of Texas Rangers, commanded by Captain Leander McNelly, and an irregular force of Mexican bandits. It took place in November 1875, in and around Las Cuevas, Tamaulipas. The Texans crossed the Rio Grande into Mexican territory with the purpose of returning stolen cattle to the American side of the river but they were drawn into a battle with local militia forces. When the fighting was over the Mexicans returned the cattle to the Texans.

== Battle ==
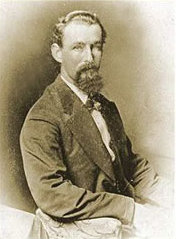
Captain Leander McNelly in 1875.

McNelly and his rangers entered Mexico November 20. Under cover of brush and scrub oak, they made their way on foot to the stronghold of Juan Flores Salinas, local leader of the rural guard, at the Rincon de Cucharras outpost of the Las Cuevas ranch. The ensuing shoot-out pitted rangers against an estimated four hundred of Salinas' men. Totally outnumbered and fearing the mounted Mexicans would surround his men, McNelly ordered his men to pull back to the river to make a stand. At the river, about half the United States Army 24th Infantry and the 8th Cavalry, under Lieutenant Colonel James F. Randlett, had lined up on the Texas side. In the melee that followed, with the aid of the army firing a Gatling gun on the Mexicans, Juan Salinas, Alcalde of Camargo, and eighty of his "banditos" died on the riverbank. The fighting wasn't over. It was a Mexican standoff with the militia retreating to regroup after their leader's death, and McNelly refusing to back down from his demands on the return of the stolen cattle. Later that afternoon, Major A. J. Alexander from Fort Ringgold arrived with a message from Colonel Potter at Fort Brown, located on the Rio Grande at Brownsville:

"Advise Captain McNelly to return at once to this side of the river. Inform him that you are directed not to support him in any way while he remains on Mexican territory. If McNelly is attacked by Mexican forces on Mexican soil, do not render him any assistance. Let me know if McNelly acts on this advice." McNelly carefully read the telegram and then issued four terse words. "The answer is no."

At sundown, another message arrived:

Major Alexander, commanding: Secretary of War [William W.] Belknap orders you to demand McNelly return at once to Texas. Do not support him in any manner. Inform the Secretary if McNelly acts on these orders and returns to Texas. Signed, Colonel Potter.

In less than a minute, Captain McNelly penned his now famous reply:

Near Las Cuevas, Mexico, Nov. 20 1875. I shall remain in Mexico with my rangers and cross back at my discretion. Give my compliments to the Secretary of War and tell him and his United States soldiers to go to hell. Signed, Lee H. McNelly, commanding.

After a rested night's sleep, Captain McNelly moved his men directly opposite Camargo on the Texas side of the river. It was now Sunday, and the stolen cattle had been moved and penned in a corral, but still on the Mexican side of the border and under guard by plenty of armed horsemen riding herd. Diego Garcia, a Camargo official next in charge to the dead alcade, promised to move the cattle across by 3:00 pm. McNelly, however, was suspicious and pulled his men to Rio Grande City to relax while he made his plans. At 3:00 pm, McNelly returned to the ferry landing, took sixteen rangers in addition to himself, and crossed the river in a rowboat in another invasion of Mexico. He also took along five horses. The "Death Squad," as they have come to be known, were composed of Captain McNelly, Lieutenant Thomas Robinson, Lieutenant Jesse Lee Hall, alias Frank Bones, Sergeant George A. Hall, Sergeant John Barclay Armstrong, Sergeant R. P. Orrell, Corporal William L. Rudd, and Rangers Lincoln Rogers Dunnison, Randolph D. Scipio, Robert H. Pitts, William Crump Callicott, Thomas McGovern, Horace G. Mabin, Thomas Sullivan acting as interpreter, George Durham, and Jesus Sandoval, also an interpreter. James R. Wofford is listed in one account as also being along. It is known for certain that the five mounted men were Robinson, Sandoval, Hall, Armstrong, and Orrell.

The squad marched up the riverbank to the customs house and demanded the cattle. When the Mexican captain stated they didn't do business on Sunday, the Texans promptly took him prisoner. McNelly then hauled the prisoner to the Texas side and told the captured Mexican leader to get the cattle started within the hour or he would die. Instead of 250 head returning to Texas, more than 400 were crossed back. Nearly every brand in the Nueces Strip was in the herd, from the King Ranch's "Running W" up near Corpus Christi to Hale and Parker's "Half-moon" brand over near Brownsville.

After the war, at the spot where Juan Salinas died, Mexico erected a stone marker reading:

To citizen
JUAN FLORES SALINAS
Who fighting
Died for his country
November 19
1875
