= John Barclay Armstrong =

Texas ranger (1850–1913)

- Born: January 1, 1850; McMinnville, Tennessee,
- Died: May 1, 1913 (aged 63); Armstrong, Texas
- Occupations: Texas Ranger, United States Marshal.
- Known for: his role in the pursuit and capture of John Wesley Hardin.

John Barclay Armstrong (January 1, 1850 – May 1, 1913) was a Texas Ranger lieutenant and a United States Marshal. He is usually remembered for his role in the pursuit and capture of the famous gunfighter John Wesley Hardin.

== Early life ==
Armstrong was born in McMinnville, Tennessee, son of Dr. John B. Armstrong and Maria Susannah Ready on January 1, 1850. Among notable relatives were his maternal grandfather Charles Ready, a U.S. Representative from Tennessee, and his cousin Confederate States Army Brigadier General John Hunt Morgan.

== Career ==
After living in Arkansas and Missouri for a short time, Armstrong moved to Austin, Texas in 1871, where he married and joined the Travis Rifles.

In May 1875, after a brief stint as a lawman, he joined the Special Force under Captain Leander H. McNelly, a newly created quasi-military branch of the Texas Rangers that was to operate in southern Texas. His role as McNelly's second-in-command and right-hand man earned him the promotion to sergeant and the nickname "McNelly's Bulldog" after the battle of Plano Alto in the Las Cuevas War for his marksmanship.

With the death of McNelly and the absorption of the Special Force by the Texas Rangers' Frontier Battalion in 1876, Armstrong was promoted to Lieutenant.

On August 24, 1877, Rangers and local authorities confronted John Wesley Hardin on a train in Pensacola, Florida. He attempted to draw a .44 Colt cap-and-ball pistol but it got caught up in his suspenders. The officers knocked Hardin unconscious. They arrested two of his companions, and Ranger Armstrong killed a third, a man named Mann, who had a pistol in his hand. Hardin claimed that he was captured while smoking his pipe and that Duncan found Hardin's pistol under his shirt only after his arrest.

In July 1878, he was involved in the pursuit and killing of bank robber Sam Bass at Round Rock.

Armstrong resigned from his position at the Rangers in 1881, and was appointed as a U.S. Marshal shortly afterwards. In 1882 established himself in Willacy County, Texas, where he founded a 50,000 acre ranch. The ranch was later reorganized into Kenedy County, Texas.

== Death ==
Armstrong died at his home in Armstrong, Texas, on May 1, 1913.

== Films ==
The film Texas Rangers (2001) portrays the exploits of Armstrong, who is played by actor Robert Patrick.
