= Kenneth MacDonald (English actor) =

English actor (1950–2001)

- Born: 20 November 1950; Manchester, England
- Died: 6 August 2001 (aged 50); Hawaii, U.S.
- Occupation: Actor
- Years active: 1966–2001
- Spouse: Sheila MacDonald
- Children: 2
- Parent: Bill MacDonald

Kenneth MacDonald (20 November 1950 – 6 August 2001) was an English actor who was best known for the parts of Gunner Nobby Clark in It Ain't Half Hot Mum and Mike Fisher in Only Fools and Horses.

== Early life ==
MacDonald was born in Manchester, the son of Scottish heavyweight wrestling champion Bill MacDonald, who died of kidney failure at the age of 43 when Kenneth was 13.

He attended Xaverian College preparatory school in Fallowfield, Manchester, St Anthony's preparatory school in Stony Stratford, Buckinghamshire, and went on to St Bernardine's Franciscan College in Buckingham, where he took part in school productions, notably The Business of Good Government, in which he played Herod, and Arsenic and Old Lace. Ken left school at eighteen to help support his mother Emily. He took a job at a Kellogg's cornflakes factory. During night shifts he would perform Hamlet and other Shakespeare plays that he had learned at school, earning the nickname "Hamlet".

== Career ==
MacDonald's first television role was as Red Whiskers in the Television film Billy Budd in 1966. MacDonald would not act professionally for another six years before playing Benny in an episode of Softly, Softly in 1972.He moved to London in 1972 and joined the National Youth Theatre. He appeared in a 1977 episode of Dad's Army.

MacDonald featured regularly in the BBC sitcom It Ain't Half Hot Mum, running from 3 January 1974 to 3 September 1981. It was set in the jungles of Burma and India during the Second World War and MacDonald played the character Gunner "Nobby" Clark, a member of a Royal Artillery Concert Party.

In 1975, he made a guest appearance in series 2, episode 1, of Last of the Summer Wine.

When he landed the part of pub landlord Mike Fisher in the Only Fools and Horses episode "Who's a Pretty Boy?" in 1983, it was initially believed to be a one-episode role. However, the character became a series regular, appearing until Christmas 1996. Also in 1996 he played Inspector Jennings in Heartbeat series 6 episode 16.

MacDonald also appeared in the Granada Television Rentals television adverts of the late 1970s and made a cameo appearance in one episode of Goodnight Sweetheart, playing Mr Jones alongside his Only Fools and Horses co-star Nicholas Lyndhurst. He also appeared in an episode of The Thin Blue Line as a club owner. In 1996 he played DI McCluskey in Crocodile Shoes II alongside Jimmy Nail. In 1992, MacDonald had a brief appearance on the Channel 4 soap Brookside as George Webb, a racist owner of a petrol station.

His last role to air before his death was as a Minder in a 2001 episode of Time Gentlemen Please.

=== Posthumous releases ===
Seven days after his death, MacDonald's guest appearance on BBC television drama Merseybeat was aired, with the episode dedicated to his memory. His last film role, as Pete in the film Dream, was first released to theatres on 26 August. His character Mike in Only Fools and Horses was not killed off; when the programme was revived for three episodes from 2001, after MacDonald's death, Mike was imprisoned for trying to embezzle money from the brewery. The last of his roles to be aired was as Stephen Pearce in an episode of The Last Detective aired in 2003.

== Personal life ==
MacDonald met his wife Sheila while he was appearing in panto in Crewe in 1976. She was the costume designer at the time. They had two children, Charlotte and William, who were fourteen and fifteen at the time of his death.

== Death ==
MacDonald died suddenly on 6 August 2001 at the age of 50 after suffering from a heart attack while on holiday with his family in Hawaii to celebrate the birthdays of his wife and daughter. He was buried in a private family-only funeral on 16 August 2001 in Section Z, Grave 140 at Teddington Cemetery, Teddington, in the London Borough of Richmond upon Thames.

Only Fools and Horses star David Jason said of MacDonald's death: "It is like losing a member of the family, because he was one of the warmest, kindest people that I have had the good fortune to meet."

== Filmography ==
=== Film ===
Year	Title	Role	Notes
1980	Breaking Glass	Security Man	
1984	Laughterhouse	Peter Armitage	
1997	My Night with Reg	Benny	
2001	Dream	Pete; Posthumous release	

=== Television ===
Year	Title	Role	Notes
1966	Billy Budd	Red Whiskers	TV movie
1972	Softly, Softly: Task Force	Benny	Episode: "Execution"
1973	Coronation Street	Mr. Worsley	2 episodes
1973	Z-Cars	Len Fordham	Episode: "Routine"
1974	Oh No It's Selwyn Froggitt	Buzz	Episode: "Oh No- It's Selwyn Froggit"
1974	Upstairs, Downstairs	Soldier	Episode: "If You Were the Only Girl in the World"
1974–1981	It Ain't Half Hot Mum	Gunner 'Nobby' Clark	56 episodes
1975	Last of the Summer Wine	Mechanic	Episode: "Forked Lightning"
1975–1981	Play for Today	School Teacher / John	2 episodes
1977	Dad's Army	The Army Sergeant	Episode: "Number Engaged"
1977–1979	The Dick Emery Show		3 episodes
1978	Come Back Mrs. Noah	Space Hen	Voice; Episode: "In Orbit"
1979	The Famous Five	Policeman	2 episodes
1980–1981	BBC2 Playhouse	Albie Warren / Bar Steward	2 episodes
1983	The All Electric Amusement Arcade	Cllr. Hogan	Episode: "Episode #1.4"
1983	Farmers Arms	Alvin	TV movie
1983	Cannon and Ball	Ship Crew Member	Episode: "Episode #5.3"
1983–1996	Only Fools and Horses	Mike Fisher	30 episodes
1984	Tenko	Corporal	Episode: "Episode #3.7"
1985	Shine on Harvey Moon	Spiv 1	Episode: "Love Is Blind"
1985	Silas Marner	Bryce	TV movie
1987	One by One	Sergeant Barnes	Episode: "Remember the Humble Guinea-Pig"
1987–1990	Boon	Arthur Dixon / Moses Wilson	2 episodes
1988	Brush Strokes	Reg	Episode: "Episode #3.4"
1990	Chain	Hickman	Episode: "Lennox"
1991	About Face	Customs Supervisor	Episode: "Monkey Business"
1992	Press Gang	Marvin Bixby	Episode: "Love and War"
1992	Surgical Spirit	Clifford	Episode: "The Fence"
1992	Brookside	George Webb	24 episodes
1994	Capital Lives	Governor	Episode: "Joan"
1994	Zig & Zag: Entertainment Cops	Mike Fisher	TV Movie
1996	And the Beat Goes On	Lance Corporal Peck	Episode: "Episode #1.7"
1996	No Bananas	Foreman	Episode: "Dunkirk"
1996	Crocodile Shoes II	D.I. McClusky	4 episodes
1996	Heartbeat	Inspector Jennings	Episode: "Old Friends"
1996	The Thin Blue Line	Nightclub Manager	Episode: "The Green Eyed Monster"
1997	The Bill	Graham Francis	Episode: "A Policeman's Lot"
1997	Performance	Benny	Episode: "My Night with Reg"
1997	Touching Evil	Cyril	4 episodes
1998	The Vanishing Man	Police Officer	Episode: "Out on a Limb"
1998	A Rather English Marriage	Barman	TV movie
1999	Goodnight Sweetheart	Mr. Jones	Episode: "Something Fishie"
1999	David Copperfield	Littimer	Episode: "Episode #1.2"
2000	The Mrs Bradley Mysteries	Alf Wolstenholm	Episode: "Laurels Are Poison"
2000	The Peter Principle	Ian Kopas	Episode: "Greyhound Day"
2000	Cor, Blimey!	Eddie	TV Movie
2000	Heartburn Hotel	O'Hare	Episode: "Siege"; credited as Kenneth Macdonald
2000	The Sins	Oy	7 episodes
2001	Time Gentlemen Please	Ms. Jackson's Minder	Episode: "All the World's a Stag"; last role shown while still alive
2001	Merseybeat	Rob Eliot	Episode: "Dead Time"; Posthumous release
	Peak Practice	Neil Jones	Episode: "Unhappy Will / Claire's Revenge"; Posthumous release
2003	The Last Detective	Stephen Pearce	Episode: "Pilot"; Posthumous release
