= Armstrong, Kenedy County, Texas =

Unincorporated community in Texas, US

Armstrong, Texas
- Unincorporated community
- Location within Texas Location within the United States
- Coordinates: 26°55′30″N 97°47′25″W
- Country: United States
- State: Texas
- County: Kenedy

Population (2000)
  - Total: 20
- Time zone: CST
  - Summer (DST): CDT
- ZIP code: 78338
- Area code: 361
- GNIS feature ID: 1377953

Armstrong is an unincorporated community in Kenedy County, Texas, United States.

== History ==
Situated on U.S. Route 77, it was established in 1914, when the Missouri Pacific Railroad was extended to it. The community was named for John Barclay Armstrong, who established Armstrong Ranch nearby, in 1893. A post office called Katherine was established in 1913, before being renamed in 1915. As of 2000, it had a population of 20. The post office closed in 2011.

== Climate ==
Armstrong has a humid subtropical climate (Köppen: Cfa). The all time record high of 111 °F (44 °C) was recorded on June 22, 2023, while the all time record low of 18 °F (-8 °C) was recorded on February 15th, 2021, January 26th and 27th, 2025.

Climate data for Armstrong, Texas (1991-2020 normals, extremes 2002-present)
| Month | Jan | Feb | Mar | Apr | May | Jun | Jul | Aug | Sep | Oct | Nov | Dec | Year |
|---|---|---|---|---|---|---|---|---|---|---|---|---|---|
| Record high °F (°C) | 93 (34) | 98 (37) | 102 (39) | 108 (42) | 108 (42) | 111 (44) | 107 (42) | 108 (42) | 105 (41) | 101 (38) | 96 (36) | 91 (33) | 111 (44) |
| Mean maximum °F (°C) | 85.9 (29.9) | 90.4 (32.4) | 94.4 (34.7) | 98.1 (36.7) | 100.0 (37.8) | 102.1 (38.9) | 101.9 (38.8) | 103.2 (39.6) | 99.6 (37.6) | 96.4 (35.8) | 91.3 (32.9) | 86.2 (30.1) | 104.9 (40.5) |
| Mean daily maximum °F (°C) | 69.7 (20.9) | 74.7 (23.7) | 79.5 (26.4) | 86.4 (30.2) | 90.8 (32.7) | 95.8 (35.4) | 96.4 (35.8) | 97.5 (36.4) | 93.8 (34.3) | 88.0 (31.1) | 79.2 (26.2) | 72.9 (22.7) | 85.4 (29.7) |
| Daily mean °F (°C) | 57.3 (14.1) | 62.3 (16.8) | 67.3 (19.6) | 73.8 (23.2) | 79.8 (26.6) | 84.1 (28.9) | 84.7 (29.3) | 85.3 (29.6) | 81.8 (27.7) | 75.2 (24.0) | 66.3 (19.1) | 60.3 (15.7) | 73.2 (22.9) |
| Mean daily minimum °F (°C) | 44.9 (7.2) | 50.0 (10.0) | 55.1 (12.8) | 61.1 (16.2) | 68.8 (20.4) | 72.3 (22.4) | 73.1 (22.8) | 73.1 (22.8) | 69.9 (21.1) | 62.3 (16.8) | 53.5 (11.9) | 47.7 (8.7) | 61.0 (16.1) |
| Mean minimum °F (°C) | 28.3 (−2.1) | 31.5 (−0.3) | 34.8 (1.6) | 42.5 (5.8) | 52.8 (11.6) | 65.6 (18.7) | 67.4 (19.7) | 67.5 (19.7) | 61.0 (16.1) | 43.0 (6.1) | 34.3 (1.3) | 28.3 (−2.1) | 25.5 (−3.6) |
| Record low °F (°C) | 18 (−8) | 18 (−8) | 25 (−4) | 34 (1) | 44 (7) | 58 (14) | 57 (14) | 62 (17) | 46 (8) | 31 (−1) | 24 (−4) | 23 (−5) | 18 (−8) |
| Average precipitation inches (mm) | 1.06 (27) | 1.34 (34) | 1.30 (33) | 1.47 (37) | 2.85 (72) | 3.23 (82) | 2.53 (64) | 2.53 (64) | 5.16 (131) | 3.33 (85) | 1.96 (50) | 1.29 (33) | 28.05 (712) |
| Average snowfall inches (cm) | 0.0 (0.0) | 0.0 (0.0) | 0.0 (0.0) | 0.0 (0.0) | 0.0 (0.0) | 0.0 (0.0) | 0.0 (0.0) | 0.0 (0.0) | 0.0 (0.0) | 0.0 (0.0) | 0.0 (0.0) | 0.0 (0.0) | 0 (0) |
Source: NOAA

== See also ==
- Kingsville, Texas micropolitan area
