= SS Santa Fe (1943) =

History
- Name: L. H. McNelly (1943–46); Zeeman (1946–50); Trompenburg (1950–59); Santa Fe (1959–67)
- Namesake: Leander H. McNelly
- Owner: War Shipping Administration (1943–46); Dutch Government (1946–47); Koninklijke Rotterdamsche-Lloyd (1947–50); Stoomboot Maatschappij Hillegersberg (1950–59); Santa Fe Naviera (1959–61); Compagnia Naviera Santa Fe Ltda. (1961–67)
- Operator: Parry Navigation Co (1943–46); Koninklijke Rotterdamsche-Lloyd (1946–50); Vinke & Co (1950–59); Amerind Shipping Corp. (1959–61); Compagnia Naviera Santa Fe Ltda (1961–67)
- Port of registry: Houston, United States (1943–46); Den Haag, Netherlands (1946–47); Rotterdam, Netherlands 1947–59); Monrovia, Liberia (1959–61); Valparaíso, Chile (1961–67)
- Builder: Todd Houston Shipbuilding Corp.
- Launched: 1943
- Identification: Code Letters KTST (1943–46); Code Letters PIXH (1946–47); Code Letters PIBG (1947–59); Code Letters CBSE (1961–67)

General characteristics
- Class & type: Liberty ship
- Tonnage: 7,244 GRT, 4,396 NRT (1943–59); 8,338 GRT, 5,760 NRT, 12,322 DWT (1959–67)
- Length: 422 feet 8 inches (128.83 m)
- Beam: 57 feet 0 inches (17.37 m)
- Depth: 34 feet 8 inches (10.57 m)
- Installed power: Triple expansion steam engine, 339nhp
- Propulsion: Single screw propeller
- Armament: Anti-torpedo nets (1943–45)

Santa Fe was a Chilean Liberty ship which was built in 1943 as L. H. McNelly. She was allocated to the Netherlands in 1946 and sold to Koninklijke Rotterdamsche-Lloyd in 1947. She was sold in 1950 and renamed Trompenburg. She was sold to Liberia in 1959, renamed Santa Fe and rebuilt. She was reflagged in 1961 to Chile. Santa Fe was reported missing in the Strait of Magellan in 1967.

== Description ==
As built, the ship was 422 feet 8 inches (128.83 m) long, with a beam of 57 feet 0 inches (17.37 m). She had a depth of 34 feet 8 inches (10.57 m)

She was powered by a triple expansion steam engine, which had cylinders of 24 1/2 inches (62 cm), 37 inches (94 cm) and 70 inches (180 cm) diameter by 48 inches (120 cm) stroke. The engine was built by the File & Stowell Co., Milwaukee, Wisconsin. It was rated at 339 nhp and drove a single screw propeller.

Defensive armament consisted of anti-torpedo nets.

== History ==
L. H. McNelly was built in 1943 by the Houston Shipbuilding Corp., Houston, Texas, for the American War Shipping Administration. She was operated under the management of the Parry Navigation Co. Her port of registry was Houston and the Code Letters KTST were allocated, as was the United States Official Number 244538.

L. H. McNelly departed from Galveston, Texas on 6 November 1943 as a member of Convoy HK 153, which arrived at Key West, Florida on 10 November. She then sailed to New York City, She then joined Convoy HX 268, which departed from New York on 26 November and arrived at Liverpool, Lancashire, United Kingdom on 11 December. She was carrying a cargo of sulphur and cotton. L. H. McNelly departed from Liverpool on 8 January 1944 as a member of Convoy ON 219. The convoy arrived at New York on 27 January. She left the convoy and put in to Halifax, Nova Scotia, Dominion of Canada, She joined Convoy HF 98, which departed from Halifax on 27 January and arrived at Saint John, New Brunswick two days later. She was bound for New York. L. H. McNelly sailed to the Hampton Roads, from where she joined Convoy UGS 34, which departed on 23 February and arrived at Port Said, Egypt, on 20 March. She then sailed to Colombo, Ceylon. L. H. McNelly departed from Colombo on 10 April with Convoy JC 44, which arrived at Calcutta, India on 17 April. She departed from Calcutta on 30 April as a member of Convoy CJ 26, which arrived at Colombo on 9 May. She then sailed to Port Said to join Convoy GUS 42, which departed on 3 June and arrived at the Hampton Roads on 29 June. She sailed on to New York. L. H. McNelly departed from New York on 25 July with Convoy HX 301, which arrived at Liverpool on 8 August. She was carrying general cargo, steel and vehicles. She left the convoy and put in to Oban, Argyllshire, United Kingdom on 8 August. She subsequently sailed to Southend, Essex, from where she departed on 23 August as a member of Convohy ETM 65, which arrived at the Seine Bay the next day. She put in to the Solent and then Southampton, Hampshire. L. H. McNelly departed from Southampton on 8 September, joining Convoy EPM 58, which had departed from Portland, Dorset and was bound for the Seine Bay. She then sailed to Liverpool, from where she departed with Convoy ON 256 on 18 September. She arrived at New York on 12 October. She departed from the Hampton Roads on 1 October as a member of Convoy UGS 59, which arrived at Port Said on 27 October. Her destination was the Persian Gulf.

In 1946, L. H. McNelly was allocated to the Netherlands. She was renamed Zeeman. She was operated under the management of Koninklijke Rotterdamsche Lloyd. Her port of registry was Den Haag and the Code Letters PIXH were allocated. In 1947, she was sold to Koninklijke Rotterdamsche Lloyd. Zeeman was sold to the Stoomboot Maatschappij Hillegersberg in 1950 and was renamed Trompenberg. Her port of registry was changed to Rotterdam and the Code Letters PIBG were allocated. She was operated under the management of Vinke & Co., Amsterdam.

In 1959, Trompenberg was sold to the Santa Fe Naviera. She was renamed Santa Fe and reflagged to Liberia. A rebuild resulted in her being assessed at 8,338 GRT, 5,760 NRT, 12,322 DWT. She was operated under the management of the Amerind Shipping Corp., New York City.

In 1961, Santa Fe was sold to the Compagnia Naviera Santa Fe, Santiago and reflagged to Chile. Her port of registry was Valparaíso and the Code Letters CBSE were allocated. She was reported missing in the Strait of Magellan (44°40′S 75°00′W) on 13 August 1967.
