= King Fisher =

American gunslinger

John King Fisher
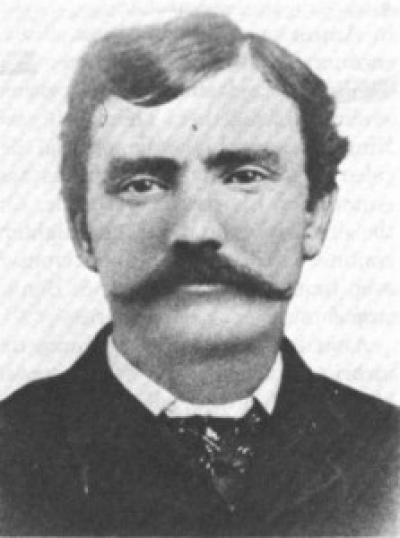
- Born: October 1853; Collin County, Texas, U.S.
- Died: March 11, 1884 (aged 30); San Antonio, Texas, U.S.
- Cause of death: Gunshot wounds
- Resting place: Pioneer Cemetery in Uvalde, Texas
- Occupations: Rancher, Gunslinger
- Spouse: Sarah Vivion Fisher (married 1876-1884, his death)
- Children: Four daughters

John King Fisher (October 1853 – March 11, 1884) was a gunslinger and vigilante from the U.S. state of Texas during the heyday of the American Old West.

== Early life and education ==
Fisher was born during October 1853 in Collin County, north of Dallas, Texas, to Jobe Fisher and the former Lucinda Warren. His brothers were Jasper and James Fisher. Fisher's mother died when he was two years old, and his father married a woman named Minerva. After the Civil War ended, the family moved to Williamson County, near Austin, where his brother James was then residing.

Jobe Fisher was a cattleman who owned and operated two freight wagons. After the death of his stepmother Minerva, the Fishers moved to Goliad, west of Victoria, Texas, where they were joined by his paternal grandmother, who helped her son raise his children. King Fisher was restless, handsome, popular with women and prone to running with a tough crowd. His father sent him to live with his brother James circa 1869. Some two years later, Fisher was arrested for horse theft and sentenced to two years in prison. However, because of his youth, he was released after only a short time that same year.

=== Cowboy and outlaw ===
After his release from prison, Fisher began working as a cowboy, breaking horses. Because of the incessant raids, lootings, and rapes of Texas ranch and farm families by bandits, he soon found himself taking part in posse activities. As a result of his successes in this arena, he fancied himself as a gunman. Fisher began to dress rather flamboyantly and carried ivory handled pistols. He became quite proficient with a gun and began running with a band of outlaws which carried out frequent raids into Mexico.

However, after only a short time, a dispute arose over how the spoils of their loot would be divided. One of the men drew his pistol, and Fisher immediately pulled his guns and managed to kill three of the bandits in the ensuing shootout. He then took over as leader of the gang, and over the course of the next several months killed seven more Mexican bandits. In 1872, he bought a ranch on the Rio Grande near Eagle Pass, in Maverick County on the Mexican border. He used this ranch as his gang's base of operations and even was so brazen as to place a sign that read "This is King Fisher's road. Take the other one."

During this time, King Fisher rarely committed acts of violence or theft against other Texas settlers, instead opting to raid and rustle cattle across the Mexican border. This was a time of massive raids, pillaging, looting, raping, and murder by United States and Mexican bandits. In response to feelings of alleged lack of reprisal or defense by authorities, the Texans formed more groups of bandits. This activity only fueled disputes and ill will from the Mexican side and generated substantial problems for Texas Ranger battalions, who were trying to quell Mexican bandit raids into Texas. The Texas Rangers, under Leander H. McNelly, opposed the Mexican rebel leader Juan Cortina. The Rangers also raided the Fisher Ranch and arrested Fisher. However, he was released after a "gentleman's agreement"' was reached that his cattle rustling into Mexico would end. Pressure from the Texas Rangers caused Fisher to retire from this trade, and he began legitimate ranching.

=== Gunfighter and lawman ===
By the late 1870s, Fisher had a reputation as being fast with a gun. In 1878, an argument between Fisher and four Mexican vaqueros erupted. Fisher is alleged to have clubbed the nearest one to him with a branding iron, then as a second drew a pistol Fisher drew his own pistol and shot and killed the man. He then spun around and shot the other two, who evidently had not produced weapons and merely sat on the fence during the altercation.

Fisher was arrested several times for altercations in public by local lawmen and had been charged at least once with "intent to kill". The charges were dropped after no witnesses came forward. He married the former Sarah Vivian on April 6, 1876, and the couple had four daughters.

With his new family, he began a more settled life by working in the cattle business. Between 1881 and 1883, he served as a deputy sheriff and later acting sheriff of Uvalde County, Texas. During this service, he trailed two stagecoach robbery suspects, the brothers Tom and Jim Hannehan, to their ranch near Leakey in Real County, Texas. The Hannehans resisted, and Fisher shot and killed Tom. Jim then surrendered and was taken into custody along with the stolen loot from the robbery. For years after Fisher's death, Tom Hannehan's mother would travel to Fisher's grave on the anniversary of Tom Hannehan's death. She would build a fire on top of the grave and then dance around it. According to reporter Carey McWilliams, when asked about how many notches he had on his gun (how many people he had killed), he replied, "thirty-seven, not counting Mexicans."

== Ambush and murder ==
In 1884, while in San Antonio, Texas, on business, Fisher came into contact with his old friend, gunfighter and gambler Ben Thompson. Thompson was unpopular in San Antonio, since he had earlier killed a popular theater owner there named Jack Harris. A feud over that killing had been brewing since between Thompson and friends of Harris. Fisher and Thompson attended a play on March 11 at the Turner Hall Opera House, and later, about 10:30 p.m., they went to the Vaudeville Variety Theater. A local lawman named Jacob Coy sat with them. Thompson wanted to see Joe Foster, a theater owner and friend of Harris's, and one of those fueling the ongoing feud. Thompson had already spoken to Billy Simms, another theater owner, and Foster's new partner.

Fisher and Thompson were directed upstairs to meet with Foster. Coy and Simms soon joined them in the theater box. Foster refused to speak to Thompson. Fisher allegedly noticed that something was not right. Simms and Coy stepped aside, and as they did Fisher and Thompson leapt to their feet just as a volley of gunfire erupted from another theater box, a hail of bullets hitting both Thompson and Fisher. Thompson fell onto his side, and either Coy or Foster ran up to him and shot him in the head with a pistol. Thompson was unable to return fire and died almost immediately. Fisher was shot thirteen times, and did fire one round in retaliation, possibly wounding Coy, but that is not confirmed. Coy may have been shot by one of the attackers and was left crippled for life.

Foster, in attempting to draw his pistol at the first of the fight, shot himself in the leg, which was later amputated. He died shortly thereafter. The description of the events of that night is contradictory. There was a public outcry for a grand jury indictment of those involved. However, no action was ever taken. The San Antonio police and the prosecutor showed little interest in the case. Fisher was buried on his ranch. His body was later moved to the Pioneer Cemetery in Uvalde, Texas.

== In popular culture ==
- Fisher is portrayed by Jack Lambert (American actor) in the 1959 episode "Incident in Leadville" of the television series Bat Masterson starring Gene Barry.
- Fisher is portrayed by Robert Yuro in "King of the Uvalde Road," a 1970 episode of the syndicated television series Death Valley Days, with Dale Robertson as host and co-star.
- Alfred Molina plays Fisher in the 2001 film Texas Rangers.
- In William W. Johnstone's Flintlock: A Time For Vultures, King Fisher appears as a mechanical man who after his apparent death is saved by an engineer who gives him clockwork parts.

== Bibliography ==
Fisher, O.Clark and Dykes, Jeff C. King Fisher: His Life and Times. Norman, OK: University of Oklahoma Press, 1966.

Police appointments
Preceded by J .B. Boatright	Sheriff of Uvalde County, Texas (acting); October 1, 1883–March 11, 1884	Succeeded by Henry Baylor
