= Texas Rangers (film) =

2001 film directed by Steve Miner

- Theatrical release poster
- Directed by: Steve Miner
- Screenplay by: Scott Busby; Martin Copeland; John Milius
- Based on: Taming the Nueces Strip: The Story of McNelly's Ranger by George Durham
- Produced by: Frank Price; Alan Griesman; Bob Weinstein; Harvey Weinstein
- Starring: James Van Der Beek; Dylan McDermott; Usher Raymond; Ashton Kutcher; Robert Patrick; Rachael Leigh Cook; Leonor Varela; Randy Travis; Jon Abrahams; Matt Keeslar; Vincent Spano; Marco Leonardi; Tom Skerritt; Alfred Molina
- Cinematography: Daryn Okada
- Edited by: Gregg Featherman; Peter Devaney Flanagan
- Music by: Trevor Rabin
- Distributed by: Dimension Films; Miramax Films
- Release date: November 30, 2001 (United States)
- Running time: Original cut 110 minutes Theatrical cut 90 minutes
- Country: United States
- Language: English
- Budget: $38 million
- Box office: $763,740

Texas Rangers is a 2001 American action Western film directed by Steve Miner and starring James Van Der Beek, Ashton Kutcher, Alfred Molina, and Dylan McDermott.

It follows a group of Texas Rangers in the post-American Civil War era. The film is very loosely based upon the book Taming the Nueces Strip by George Durham, who based it on his own experiences serving in Captain Leander McNelly's Texas Ranger group as a young man.

Texas Rangers was released by Dimension Films and Miramax Films on November 30, 2001. The film was panned by critics and was a box office bomb, grossing $763,740 against a $38 million budget.

== Plot ==
Ten years after the Civil War, the governor of Texas asks Leander McNelly to recommission a company of Texas Rangers to help uphold the law along the Mexican border. In a border town, Lincoln Rogers Dunnison arrives by carriage to meet his family. Just as they are reunited, John King Fisher and his gang arrive and kill several townspeople, including Lincoln's father, mother and brother, then steal cattle which are to be auctioned. After the attack, Lincoln wanders into an abandoned church and meets George Durham, a cowhand whose outfit was attacked by the same bandits. George joins Lincoln on his way to Brownsville to join the Rangers.

In Brownsville, Lincoln witnesses a man attempting to extort resources from the town to support his posse, which will supposedly pursue Fisher's gang. McNelly arrives with the legitimate Rangers and is forced to kill the man, but invites any others to join his company. Despite his ineptitude with weapons and not being from Texas, Lincoln shows determination to fight for justice and is accepted into the Rangers, along with George and others. McNelly uses Lincoln as his secretary because of his education and reveals that he is dying, apparently of tuberculosis. Out on the trail, Fisher and his gang encounter a traveling circus and kidnap a beautiful Mexican juggler named Perdita.

After training in the field, another Ranger named Sam Walters asks Lincoln to get him an appointment with McNelly because he wants to make better maps of the ill-charted Texas territory. Once in his tent, he reveals himself to be an assassin who wants to kill McNelly. McNelly kills Walters, but Lincoln is shaken and tries to desert, believing himself responsible for endangering McNelly. McNelly convinces Lincoln to stay.

The Rangers get their first taste of combat against a small contingent and take two prisoners. Despite saying that anyone who surrendered would be tried, McNelly hangs the survivors when their treachery is revealed. Lincoln is offended by this apparent lack of justice. Later, when the Rangers catch up with the bulk of Fisher's gang, McNelly decides to attack, despite the protests of his sergeants. The battle goes horribly as Fisher planned an ambush and several Rangers die. McNelly collects his survivors, including Perdita, and heads for the ranch of his old friend, Captain Richard Dukes.

While there, Lincoln and George compete for the affection of Dukes' daughter, Caroline. Sergeant Armstrong learns from Perdita that Fisher is planning to raid Victor Logan's ranch. The Rangers ride out, but when no raid occurs, McNelly realizes that the girl lied, and Fisher must be headed for the Dukes ranch instead. The Rangers discover that Dukes has been captured and Fisher has crossed the Rio Grande into Mexico. Fisher lynches Dukes after deriding McNelly in front of his men, and Lincoln argues for Perdita's innocence as McNelly is on the cusp of executing her in retaliation. McNelly releases the girl. The Rangers plot their attack on the Mexican fortress after McNelly dictates his will to Lincoln, in which he leaves him his possessions and effectively instates him as leader.

The Rangers attack the fort at dawn; the Fisher gang is asleep and hungover and overpowered when Sergeant Bones takes command of a Gatling gun. Lincoln avenges his family by killing Fisher. After the Rangers return to the Dukes ranch, McNelly, on his deathbed, implores Lincoln and George to keep the Rangers on the right side of justice. George stays behind with Caroline to work on the ranch and Lincoln rides off to lead the Rangers.

== Cast ==
- James Van Der Beek as Lincoln Rogers Dunnison
- Rachael Leigh Cook as Caroline Dukes
- Ashton Kutcher as George Durham
- Dylan McDermott as Captain Leander McNelly
- Usher Raymond as Randolph Douglas Scipio
- Tom Skerritt as Captain Richard Dukes
- Alfred Molina as John King Fisher
- Vincent Spano as Ed Simms
- Randy Travis as Sergeant Frank Bones
- Robert Patrick as Sergeant John Armstrong
- Marco Leonardi as Jesus Sandoval
- Matt Keeslar as Sam Walters
- Oded Fehr as Anton Marsele
- Brian Martell as Jean-Pierre Marsele
- Joe Renteria as General Cortinas
- Jon Abrahams as Berry Smith
- Leonor Varela as Perdita
- Joe Spano as Mr. Dunnison
- Breon Gorman as Mrs. Dunnison
- Jordan Brower as Jake Dunnison
- James Coburn as Narrator

== Production ==
The film's source was the book Taming of the Neuces Strip: The Story of McNelly's Rangers by George Durham.

In 1989, Frank Price at Columbia optioned a story idea called Ranger from Scott Busby and Martin Copland based on the book A Texas Ranger by N. A. Jennings. Busby and Copland were hired to do the adaptation. A year later John Milius was on the project. He wrote several drafts and was going to direct for Columbia, then Savoy Pictures.

In 1992 Milius said he hoped to make the film with a young cast for $15–17 million, which is "very reasonable today", he said:

It's very easy to make Westerns. Most of the people making decisions today are idiots who've probably never seen one, city-born people who feel that the here and now is most important. They don't like historical films of any kind, especially Westerns. Sci-fi is acceptable but history is not hip. Part of being modern is that anything from the past is dead. We live in an historical age. An enormous amount of people were interested in TV's The Civil War and Lonesome Dove--which Hollywood writes off as the great unwashed between the coasts. We're the only culture in history that builds a shrine and prostrates before the 14-year-old.

Milius added: "The best Westerns were love poems to this country, made by people in love with the country physically. John Ford photographed the country the way you photograph a woman. He photographed the open spaces, gray clouds, light, red earth, trees, really sensuously. The country was the repository of endless promise. Any good Western is about promise".

Milius says he "got pretty close to making the film but they wouldn’t approve Tommy Lee Jones as the star, so I left it to go do Vikings [a film that ultimately was not made]. Another guy worked on it, the script was rewritten, but they were never able to get it made. They couldn’t attract the cast they wanted. So now these other characters [Bob and Harvey Weinstein] bought it".

The film did not begin production until 1999. It was made by Miramax, who cast some young teen idols in the lead, including James Van Der Beek from Varsity Blues. Milius was replaced as director, and screenwriter Ehren Kruger was hired to do a rewrite on Milius's script.

Milius commented that "it was one of my best scripts, and I wasn't willing to sit there and proceed to dismantle it. Youth today have a sense of rightful entitlement. Their idea of great adventure is diving off bridges with bungee cords. They don't go and do something real-they're all interested in looking good and getting that BMW".

Milius said the Weinsteins "were really arrogant. They called me up and acted as if I should feel privileged to come back and ruin my own work. I told that asshole Bob Weinstein he was lucky to have it the way it was".

While filmed in 1999, the film was not released until 2001. Neither Milius nor Kruger were credited on the final film.

The film is loosely based on the activities of Leander H. McNelly and the Special Force of the Texas Rangers, but it takes considerable liberties with the historical record (McNelly is shown dying of tuberculosis shortly after the climax of the action, when in real life he had retired from the Rangers the year before; John King Fisher was not actually killed by the Rangers, but came to an agreement with them).

== Release ==
=== Box office ===
Texas Rangers was a box office bomb, earning only $763,740 on a budget of $38 million.

=== Reception ===
On the review aggregator website Rotten Tomatoes, 2% of 50 critics' reviews are positive, with an average rating of 3.4/10. The website's consensus reads: "As far as westerns go, Texas Rangers is strictly mediocre stuff." Metacritic, which uses a weighted average, assigned the film a score of 29 out of 100, based on 10 critics, indicating "generally unfavorable" reviews.

John Milius claimed that Miramax "mutilated" his script: "They don't have any sense of responsibility. They'd make a film about anything if they thought it would make some money for them. I think they should give Harvey Weinstein [president of Miramax] to the Taliban. I'd like to see him on the other side. I'd like to hunt him down in a cave".
