= Inter National Bank =

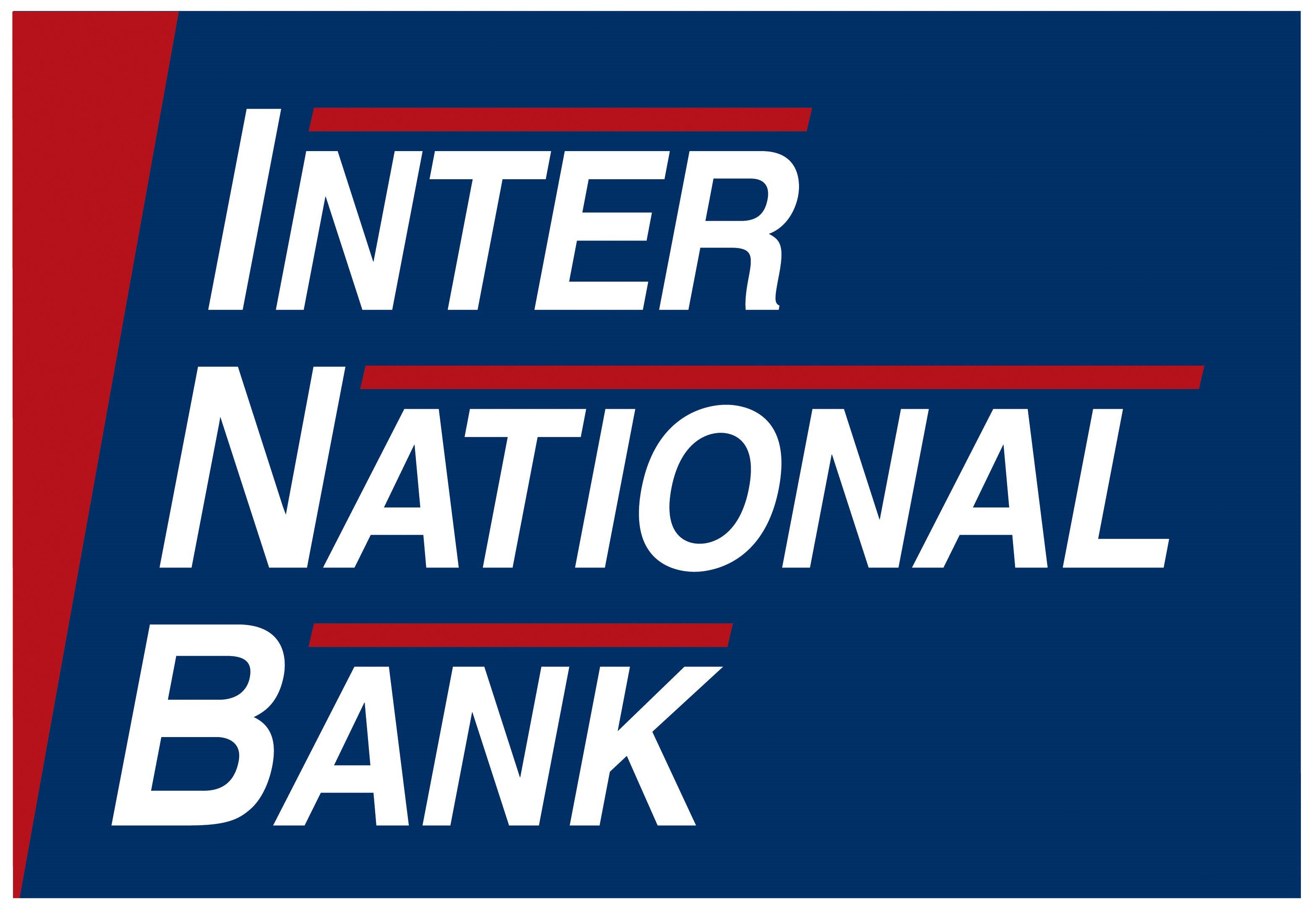

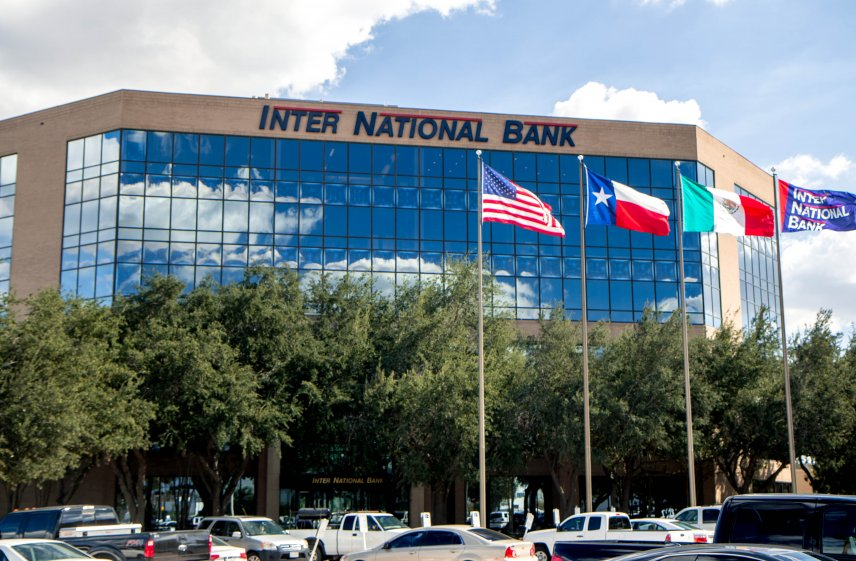
- Inter National Bank Headquarters, McAllen Texas
- Industry: Financial services
- Predecessor: Hidalgo Federal Savings & Loan Association
- Founded: January 24, 1985
- Defunct: November 20, 2018
- Fate: Merged
- Successor: Vantage Bank Texas
- Headquarters: McAllen, Texas, United States
- Number of locations: 20 branches
- Area served: Texas
- Products: Banking services

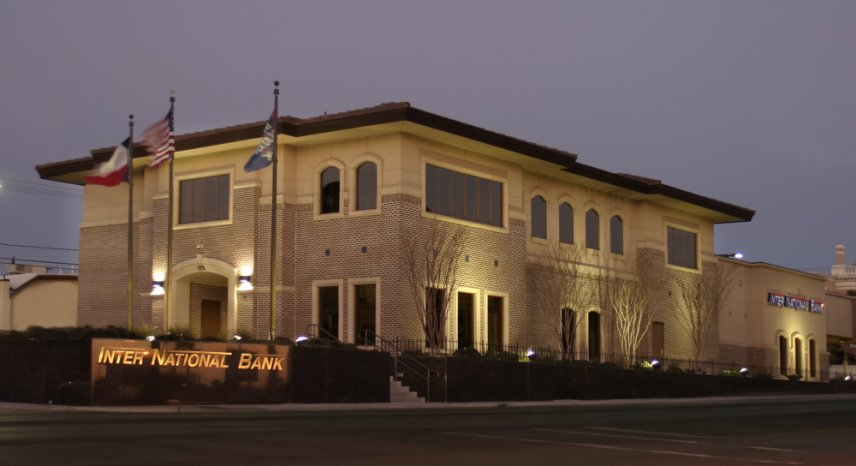
Inter National Bank El Paso Downtown Branch, El Paso, Texas

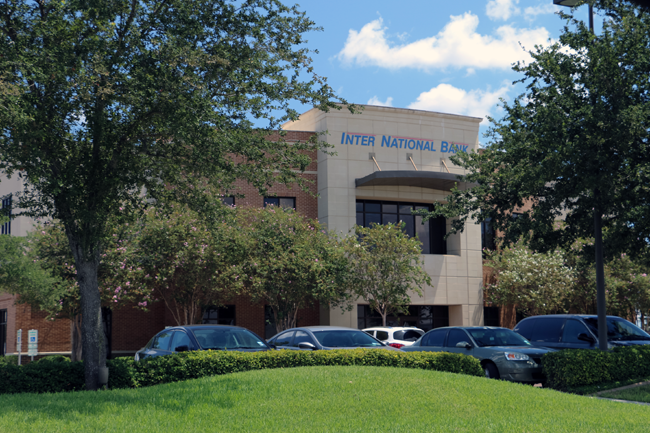
Inter National Bank McColl Rd Branch, McAllen Texas

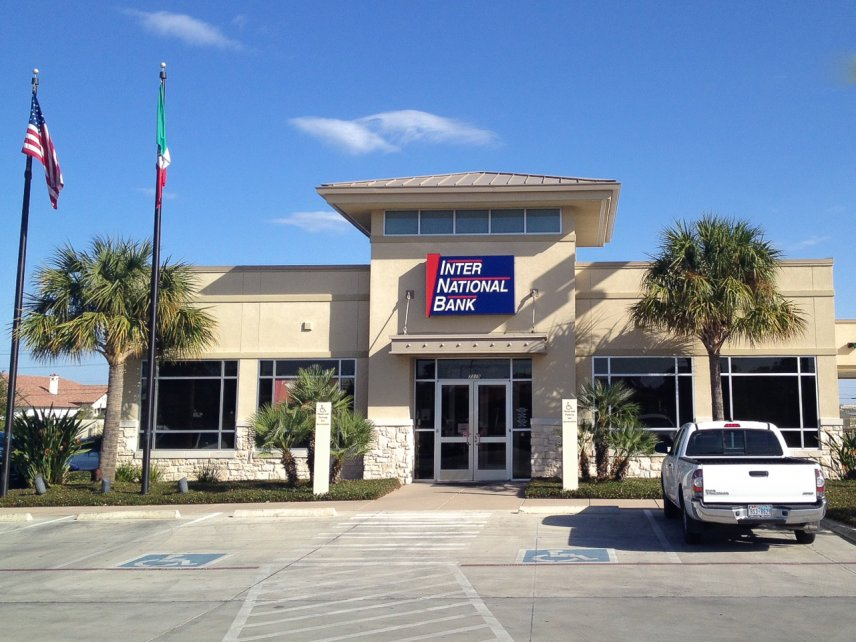
Inter National Bank Laredo Branch, Laredo, Texas

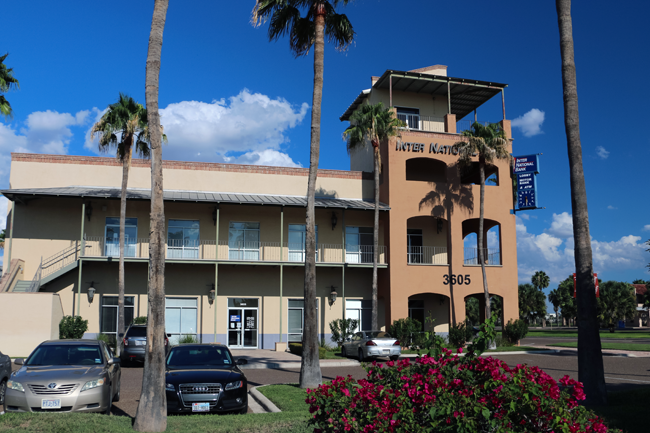
Inter National Bank Sharyland Plantation Branch, Mission, Texas

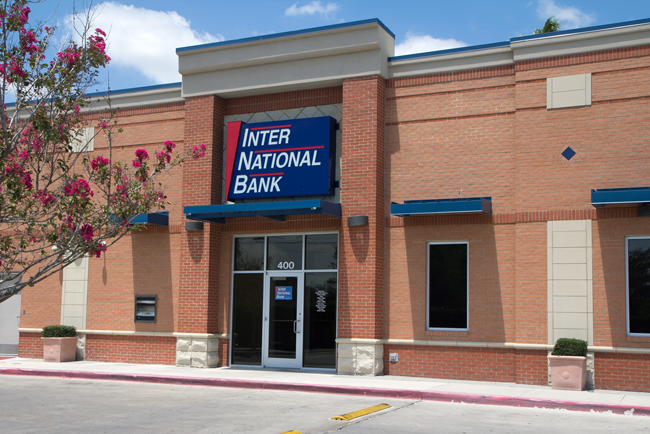
Inter National Bank Weslaco Branch, Weslaco, Texas

Inter National Bank was a U.S. bank headquartered in McAllen, Texas. It had 20 Texas locations and offered a full range of banking products for businesses and consumers in the Rio Grande Valley, El Paso and Laredo. As of 2013, it was included in the list of the top 30 largest banks by asset size headquartered in Texas.

On November 20, 2018, Inter National Bank merged into Vantage Bank Texas. The consolidated bank operates under the Vantage Bank Texas name.

Before its merger, Inter National Bank had a Five Star Safe & Sound rating by Bankrate, its highest rating. Inter National Bank maintained a Bankrate Safe & Sound five star rating from September 2013 to December 2015. Inter National Bank was also rated Five-Star Superior for financial strength by BauerFinancial and was included in the Bauer's Recommended Bank Report.

== History ==
In 1991, Hidalgo Federal Savings & Loan Association in Edinburg, Texas failed and a portion of its assets were acquired by Inter National Bank.

In 2002, the American Bankers Association's ABA Banking Journal named Inter National Bank the top performing non-Subchapter S bank in the nation with assets between $100 million and $1 billion.

In 2005, Inter National Bank acquired Weslaco-based City National Bank.

In 2006, Mexico's Banorte acquired 70% of INB Financial Corp stock for $259 million. INB Financial Corp is the holding company of Inter National Bank. Banorte exercised its option to acquire the remaining 30% of INB Financial Corp stock for $146.6 million in 2009.

On November 3, 2016, it was announced that the Collins Family Trust was acquiring Inter National Bank from Banorte. Terms of the deal were not disclosed. James W. Collins, trustee of the Collins Family Trust, is one of the original founders of the bank and was the majority shareholder prior to the Banorte acquisition.

On March 31, 2017 the Collins Family completed the purchase of Inter National Bank and named James W. Collins, Chairman of the Board.

On November 20, 2018, Inter National Bank merged into Vantage Bank Texas. The consolidation, which operates under the Vantage Bank Texas name, created a community bank with $1.9 billion in total assets. Vantage Bank Texas was founded in 1923 and is a family-owned, community-based financial institution headquartered in San Antonio, Texas.
