= Billy Macdonald (footballer, born 1976) =

Scottish footballer

Personal information
- Full name: William James Macdonald
- Date of birth: 17 September 1976 (age 50)
- Place of birth: Irvine, Scotland
- Height: 5 ft 7 in (1.70 m)
- Position: Midfielder

Youth career
- –1995: West Bromwich Albion

Senior career*
Years	Team	Apps	(Gls)
1995–1998	Partick Thistle	58	(2)
1998	FF Jaro	2	(0)
1998–1999	Dunfermline Athletic	1	(0)
1999	Livingston	6	(0)
1999	Clydebank	4	(0)
1999–2002	Stranraer	75	(4)
2002–2003	East Stirlingshire	7	(0)
2004	Queen of the South	0	(0)

Managerial career
- 2015–2016: Lesmahagow
- * Club domestic league appearances and goals as of 13:35, 21 February 2018 (UTC)

William James Macdonald (born 17 September 1976) is a Scottish former professional footballer who played in the Scottish Premier Division for Partick Thistle and Dunfermline Athletic.

== Career ==
Having been an apprentice pro at West Bromwich Albion under Ossie Ardiles and Keith Burkinshaw, Macdonald returned to Scotland and made his first league appearances for Partick Thistle in the Scottish Premier Division. Macdonald made headlines after a match against Rangers where he received a red card for a late altercation with Paul Gascoigne although he received the sponsors man of the match award for the same game. Thistle were relegated via a play-off at the end of the 1995–96 season but Macdonald remained at Firhill for two further years. After leaving Thistle, Macdonald had a brief spell in Finland with FF Jaro before making one Premier Division appearance for Dunfermline Athletic then having short spells at several clubs in the Scottish Football League.

Macdonald spent three seasons at Stranraer and was appointed club captain under manager Billy McLaren. He joined Queen of the South in September 2004 but never made a league appearance and was eventually forced to retire due to a cruciate injury.

After coaching locally, Macdonald was appointed manager of hometown team Lesmahagow in November 2015 but left this role in April the following year. He has since been part of manager Andy Frame's coaching staff at Thorniewood United and Cumbernauld United.
