= Vantage Bank Texas =

Vantage Bank
- Company type: Family-owned and locally operated
- Industry: Banking
- Founded: 1923; 103 years ago
- Headquarters: San Antonio, Texas
- Key people: Jeff Sinnott CEO
- Total assets: $4.5 Billion (2024)
- Website: https://www.vantage.bank/

Vantage Bank Texas, formerly San Antonio National Bank is a financial institution headquartered in San Antonio, Texas. It serves businesses and consumers in the Rio Grande Valley, San Antonio, Laredo, El Paso, Hondo, Refugio, and Houston.

== History ==
On February 12, 2012, San Antonio National Bank changed its name to Vantage Bank Texas .

On November 27, 2018, Inter National Bank and Vantage Bank Texas merged. The consolidation, which was to operate under Vantage Bank Texas, created a community bank with $1.9 billion in total assets.
