= Bill MacDonald (wrestler) =

Scottish wrestler

William MacDonald (c.1920 or 1921 – 1964) was a British heavyweight wrestling champion from Scotland. He was the father of actor Kenneth MacDonald (1950-2001). Kenneth was most famous for playing the role of Mike Fisher in the British sitcom Only Fools and Horses (1981-1996).
