= Willie McDonald (footballer, born 1883) =

Scottish footballer

Personal information
- Date of birth: 1883
- Place of birth: Scotland
- Position: Wing half

Senior career*
Years	Team	Apps	(Gls)
19??–1904	Nithsdale Wanderers		
1904–1906	Kilmarnock	45	(2)
- → Lanemark (loan)
1906–1908	Brighton & Hove Albion	68	(6)
1908–1909	Leeds City	14	(0)
1909	Nithsdale Wanderers		
1909–1915	Lanemark		
- * Club domestic league appearances and goals

William McDonald (1883 – after 1914) was a Scottish professional footballer who played as a wing half in the Scottish League for Kilmarnock and in the English Football League for Leeds City. He was a member of the Brighton & Hove Albion team that won the 1909–10 Southern League title and the 1910 FA Charity Shield.
