= William Bell Macdonald =

Scottish surgeon and linguist (1807–1862)

William Bell Macdonald (1807–1862) was a Scottish surgeon and linguist.

== Life ==
Macdonald, eldest son of Donald Macdonald, by Mary, daughter of William Bell of Rammerscales, near Lockerbie, Dumfriesshire, was born in Scotland in 1807, and was educated at the University of Glasgow, where he graduated B.A. 1827. After studying medicine he served as surgeon in Sir Pulteney Malcolm's flagship in the Mediterranean from 1828 to 1831, and was afterwards a commissioner of supply.

On the death of an uncle named Bell he succeeded to the estate of Rammerscales, where he collected a large and valuable library. For some years he represented the burgh of Lochmaben in the general assembly of the church of Scotland. He died at 114 West Campbell Street, Glasgow, 5 December 1862, and was buried in Dalton churchyard.

== Publications ==
Macdonald had a reputation as a linguist, someone who could translate an old Scottish song into German, Latin, Greek, or Hebrew of his time. He studied the Coptic language.

- Lusus Philologici. Ex Museo Gul. B. Macdonald, Rammerscales, 1851.
- Ten Scottish Songs rendered into German, 1854.
- Sketch of a Coptic Grammar adapted for Self-Tuition, 1856.
- Philological Analysis Of Polysemy and Lexical Chicanery Present In Codex P. Kaufman 010169 Of The Murphy Gammon Collection Of Ancient Manuscripts Housed At T of I, 1862

To the Ray Society in 1846 he communicated reports on zoology and botany translated from German.

== Family ==
In 1839, Macdonald married Helen, third daughter of Thomas Johnstone of Underwood.
