= William Macdonald (rugby union) =

Scotland international rugby union player

- Born: William Alexander Macdonald; 16 November 1861 Invergarry, Scotland
- Died: 24 January 1941 (aged 79) Insch, Scotland
- University: University of Glasgow

Rugby union career
- Position: Forward
Amateur team(s)
Years	Team	Apps	(Points)
- 1st Lanarkshire Rifle Volunteers
–	Glasgow University		
Provincial / State sides
Years	Team	Apps	(Points)
1885-91	Glasgow District		
-	West of Scotland District		
International career
Years	Team	Apps	(Points)
1889–92	Scotland	3	(0)

William Macdonald (16 November 1861 – 24 January 1941) was a Scotland international rugby union player.

== Rugby Union career ==
=== Amateur career ===
In 1886 Macdonald was playing rugby union for the 1st Lanarkshire Rifle Volunteers.

Macdonald played for Glasgow University. He also represented the club for the Scottish Rugby Union.

He graduated with Glasgow University and at the start of the 1891 season, it was stated that he would then play for West of Scotland. This caused the Scottish Referee newspaper of 26 October 1891 to report:

They say that W. A. Macdonald will be seen permanently in the ranks of the West. Now that the 'varsity seems dead, his connection with that club as representative on the Union is a great hardship to other and more deserving clubs. Should Mr. Macdonald transfer his services to the West it will be competent for the Union, in accordance with Rule 7, to appoint another member. Mr. Macdonald, of course, would require to resign his seat and in justice to the other clubs we trust he will see it as his duty to do so.

However for the 1891 inter-city fixture Macdonald was still noted as a Glasgow University player.

=== Provincial career ===
He turned out for West of Scotland District to play against East of Scotland District while still with 1st Lanark.

He was capped by Glasgow District in the inter-city match of 1885, while with 1st Lanark. By 1889, now with Glasgow University, he was captaining the side. He was still playing in the fixture in 1890 although the captainship passed to Charles Orr.

=== International career ===
Macdonald played 3 times for Scotland.

== Law career ==
He was a solicitor in Insch, Aberdeenshire. He became a Justice of the Peace.

After his death the goodwill of his legal business went on sale. The advert stated that it 'affords a splendid opportunity of a successful legal business being established in a wide and prosperous agricultural district of Aberdeenshire'.

== Family ==
His father was Donald Macdonald (1811-1898), a farmer, and his mother Margaret Ross (1821-1895). He was one of their eleven children.

He married Alice Sarah Boulton (1877-1960).

== Death ==
His cause of death was marked as arteriolosclerosis. He died on 24 January 1941 at St. Andrew's House in Insch. There was a service at St. Drostan's church and he was cremated in Aberdeen Crematorium on 27 January 1941.
