= Billy McDonald (footballer, born 1892) =

English footballer

Personal information
- Full name: William McDonald
- Date of birth: 1892
- Place of birth: Quebec, County Durham, England
- Date of death: 1948 (aged 55–56)
- Height: 5 ft 6 in (1.68 m)
- Position: Winger

Senior career*
Years	Team	Apps	(Gls)
1907–1908	Craghead United		
1908–1911	Shirebrook Moors Athletic		
1911–1914	Hull City	69	(5)
1914–1915	Chesterfield Town		
1919	Durham City		
1919–1923	Fulham	75	(2)
1923–1924	Shirebrook		
1924–1925	Durham City	6	(0)
1925	Shirebrook		
1925	Alfreton Town		
1925	Hardwick Colliery		
1926	Grantham		
Total		150	(7)
- * Club domestic league appearances and goals

William McDonald (1892–1948) was an English footballer who played in the Football League for Durham City, Fulham and Hull City.
