= Bill McDonald (American journalist) =

American journalist

William McDonald is an American journalist and editor for The New York Times who was the newspaper's obituaries editor from 2006 to 2026.

McDonald, a former editor at Newsday on Long Island, joined the New York Times in 1988 and has held numerous positions at the paper. He was the copy chief of the national news desk, assistant national editor, deputy editor of Arts & Leisure and deputy culture editor. He was part of the team that won the Pulitzer Prize for National Reporting in 2000 for the series, How Race Is Lived in America. He was the obituaries editor from February 2006 until retiring in June 2026. He grew up in Stratford, Connecticut, and earned degrees at Fairfield University in Connecticut and Syracuse University in New York. He is married and lives in Manhattan.
