= William James Macdonald =

Scottish mathematics educator

- Born: December 14, 1851
- Died: December 29, 1941 (aged 90)
- Education: University of St Andrews
- Scientific career
- Workplaces: Madras College, Merchiston Castle School, Daniel Stewart’s College

William James Macdonald FRSE was born on 14 December 1851 in Scotland. He is known for being a pioneer of the introduction of modern geometry to the mathematical curriculum in schools and for being one of the founding members of the Edinburgh Mathematical Society.

== Biography ==
Macdonald was born in Huntly, Aberdeenshire, but moved to the coastal town of St Andrews when he was young. There he got an education in Madras College, and became dux of the college in 1868.

After completing his school education, he entered the University of St Andrews, where he studied a variety of subjects including mathematics, English literature, Latin, Greek, chemistry, and philosophy. While there Macdonald won many prizes, including the Miller prize given to the student who did the best work in 1870, 1871, and 1872, the Gray prize in 1872 for an essay on spectrum analysis, and the Arnott prize, also in 1872.

After graduating, Macdonald was appointed assistant to the Mathematics Department in Madras College, but only taught there for a short time before accepting a role as Mathematics Master at Merchiston Castle school in Edinburgh. He soon after accepted a role at Daniel Stewart’s College where he spent the rest of his career.

Between 1898 and 1899, he was the president of the Scottish Secondary Teachers' Association.

He died in Edinburgh on 29 December 1941.

== Accomplishments ==
Macdonald was a pioneer in the introduction of modern geometry to the mathematical curriculum. He wrote Higher Geometry: Containing an Introduction to Modern Geometry and Elementary Geometrical Conics, a text which was widely used in schools and colleges to teach geometry.

He was a founding member of the Edinburgh Mathematical Society, and was honoured by the society when he was elected as president for 1887-88 session.

On the 1st of February 1886, he accepted a fellowship to the Royal Society of Edinburgh after being proposed by William Swan, John Sturgeon Mackay, George Chrystal, and Sir Thomas Muir.

In June 1914, he was offered the degree of LL.D by the Senatus Academicus of the University of St Andrews, but he respectfully declined the honour.
