= William Jesse McDonald =

American police officer (1852–1918)

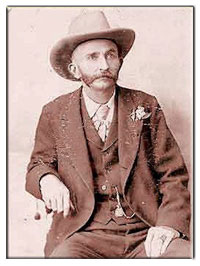
- Born: September 28, 1852; Kemper County, Mississippi, US
- Died: January 15, 1918 (aged 65); Wichita Falls, Texas, US
- Occupation: Police officer
- Honours: Texas Ranger Hall of Fame inductee

William Jesse McDonald (September 28, 1852 – January 15, 1918) was an American police officer. A captain in the Texas Rangers, he later served as a bodyguard to Presidents Theodore Roosevelt and Woodrow Wilson. He is a member of the Texas Ranger Hall of Fame.

== Early life ==
McDonald was born on September 18, 1852, in Kemper County, Mississippi, one of three children born to Enoch McDonald and Eunice (née Durham) McDonald. He received little schooling. He grew up on a cotton farm, with his family owning at least six slaves. During the American Civil War, his father was a major in the 40th Mississippi Infantry Regiment, dying in the Siege of Corinth in 1862.

Around 1866, McDonald and his family moved to a farm near Henderson, Texas which his uncle owned. According to Albert Paine, he once protested a federal lynching investigation. After Peter Green, McDonald's relative, was lynched, several black men were accused, after which they were jailed, forcibly removed from jail by a mob, then lynched. Charley Green, the brother of Peter Green, shot out the courthouse windows, with both men attempting to seize the building. They were arrested and charged with treason, but were acquitted thanks to their lawyer, David B. Culberson.

McDonald graduated from Soule Business College in 1872.

== Career ==
Returning to Henderson, McDonald taught penmanship. In 1873 or 1874, he established a store in what is today Elderville. He then established a dry good store in Mineola c. 1875, meeting Jim Hogg in the process.

McDonald first became a police officer while in Mineola. He was deputy sheriff of Wood County in the early 1880s. Some years later, he was charged with working outside his jurisdiction and injuring a man in an illegal arrest; he was never prosecuted, for Hogg was the district attorney. Due to financial decline in Minolea, he left East Texas. In 1883, he drove cattle to Wichita County, selling them the following year and entering the lumber business in Wichita Falls. In 1886, he again acquired cattle.

McDonald later moved to Hardeman County, becoming its deputy sheriff and a Texas Ranger. He became deputy marshal of the United States District Courts of the Northern District of Texas and the Southern District of Kansas. As deputy marshal, he made the Brooken gang flee Henderson and fought cattle thieves and train robbers in the Oklahoma panhandle and the Cherokee Outlet. In January 1891, Hogg, now Governor, appointed McDonald captain of Company B of the Frontier Battalion of the Rangers, which he served as until 1907.

In December 1893, McDonald entered into a gunfight with John P. Matthews, the sheriff of Childress County, in the city of Quanah. McDonald has accused Matthews of plotting his murder, which Matthews denied. They fought at a train depot after McDonald confronted him; McDonald sustained a bullet to either shoulder and survived, while Matthews later died from his injuries.

As captain, McDonald and his Company solved a number of murders and bank robberies in the Texas panhandle. On February 21, 1896, they oversaw the Bob Fitzsimmons vs. Peter Maher boxing match, which took place in Mexico, to ensure it did not cross into Texas, for boxing was then illegal in the state. In legend, he was said to have stopped the fight singlehandedly.

In 1905, McDonald was a bodyguard of President Theodore Roosevelt during a visit to Texas, with Roosevelt later having him as a guest at the White House. In August 1906, the he and the Company were involved in the Brownsville affair. In November 1906, they were in Starr County investigating the murder of judge Stanley Osborne Welch, when they were ambushed.

In January 1907, Governor Thomas Mitchell Campbell appointed McDonald as a state revenue agent. As an agent, he enforced the Full Rendition Act, which he was criticized for. In 1911 and 1912, he was a serjeant-at-arms for the Texas Legislature. He bodyguarded for President Woodrow Wilson, who appointed him marshal of the Northern District of Texas.

== Personal life, death, and legacy ==
In January 1876, McDonald married Rhoda Isabel Carter, who he met through Hogg; they had no children together. She later died, and in 1913, he married Pearl Wilkirson. He died on January 15, 1918, aged 65, in Wichita Falls, from pneumonia, and was buried at the Quanah Memorial Park.

McDonald's motto was "no man in the wrong can stand up against a fellow that's in the right and keeps on a-comin'.", which is inscrbed on his tombstone. He, alongside James Brooks, John Hughes, John Harris Rogers, are considered the "Four Great Captains". On February 6, 1976, he became an inaugural inductee into the Texas Ranger Hall of Fame. In 1999, a placard commemorating him was installed in Mineola, by the Texas Historical Commission.
