= John B. Jones =

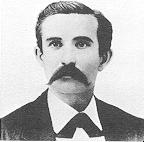
Captain John B. Jones.

John B. Jones (December 22, 1834 – July 19, 1881) was a Confederate army officer, Texas Ranger captain, and Adjutant General of Texas. Born in Fairfield, South Carolina, his family moved to the Republic of Texas in 1838.

== Early life ==
His parents Henry and Nancy (Robertson) Jones were of Welsh descent and moved to the area that became Travis County, Texas when John was four years old. The family later moved to the future Matagorda County and then Navarro County where they were planters and stockmen. Jones was a slaveholder.

At the beginning of the Civil War, Jones enlisted and served in the Eighth Texas Cavalry regiment (better known as "Terry's Texas Rangers") under the command of Benjamin Franklin Terry. He was later promoted to the rank of major.

After the war, he moved briefly to Mexico with the purpose of locating and founding an exile colony for former Confederate supporters, but he returned to Texas after the attempt failed. In 1874, and after a short incursion in politics, he accepted the offer of commanding a newly formed branch of the Texas Rangers, named the "Frontier Battalion." This force had the special task of stopping the numerous Indian raids and enforcing the law within the territory of the State.

In the following years, Jones engaged in battle with the Comanche, the Kiowa and the Apache on several occasions, and the Frontier Battalion under his command was instrumental in ending the Indian incursions and raids over the settlers' homesteads. His force also played a major role in pursuing and capturing many criminals and outlaws, such as noted bank robber Sam Bass in 1878.

Jones was an active Mason, and in 1879 he achieved the position of Worshipful Master of the Masonic Lodge in Austin. He died in Austin on July 19, 1881, while still in command of the Frontier Battalion, which continued to be operational until 1901.

== In Pop Culture ==
- A character in the 1951 film The Texas Rangers. The fictional tale has real-life outlaws Sam Bass, John Wesley Hardin, Dave Rudabaugh, Butch Cassidy and The Sundance Kid forming a gang, then squaring off against two convicts recruited by Jones to bring them to justice.
