= Leander H. McNelly =

Confederate States Army officer

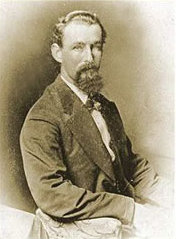
- McNelly in 1875.
- Born: March 12, 1844; Follansbee, Virginia, United States
- Died: September 4, 1877 (aged 33); Burton, Texas, United States
- Burial place: Mount Zion Cemetery
- Spouse: Carey Cheek McNelly
- Children: 2
- Military career
- Allegiance: Confederate States of America
- Branch: Confederate States Army
- Service years: 1861–1865
- Unit: 5th Regiment of Texas Mounted Volunteers
- Commands: Texas Rangers
- Conflicts: American Civil War: Battle of Valverde; Battle of Galveston; Battle of Mansfield (WIA); Las Cuevas War

Leander Harvey McNelly (March 12, 1844 – September 4, 1877) was a Confederate officer and Texas Ranger captain. McNelly is best remembered for leading the "Special Force", a quasi-military branch of the Texas Rangers that operated in south Texas in 1875–76.

== Early years ==
Leander H. McNelly was born March 12, 1844, in Follansbee, Virginia (today West Virginia), to P.J. McNelly and his wife Mary Downey. McNelly suffered from consumption as a child, and in 1860 his family moved to Texas in the hope that the climate would improve his health. In Texas, McNelly helped his family raise sheep and regained his health.

== Civil War ==
On September 13, 1861, McNelly enlisted in the Confederate States Army, joining Company F of the Fifth Regiment of Texas Mounted Volunteers under General Thomas Green. After the Battle of Valverde during the New Mexico campaign, Green named McNelly his aide. Following fighting in the Battle of Galveston, McNelly was sent to Louisiana, where he was given a commission on December 19, 1863. He led 100 guerrilla scouts, and once carried out a spying mission dressed as a woman.

McNelly and his men were tasked with capturing Brashear City, Louisiana (now Morgan City), where 800 Union troops were stationed. After dark, McNelly and his 40 troops marched back and forth across a long bridge that led to the city, shouting as if they were speaking to unseen generals and colonels. At dawn, McNelly and his small force rode into the Union camp under a flag of truce and demanded an unconditional surrender. The Union officers believed that the noise they had heard signified a very large Confederate force and surrendered immediately. McNelly was able to take all 800 Union troops prisoner.

In April 1864, McNelly was wounded at the Battle of Mansfield. He took no sick leave or furlough in the entire four years of fighting, however. In the last months of the war he led mounted scouts working near Hempstead, Texas, to round up deserters, and his unit was one of the last Confederate Army units to disband. Following the war, McNelly moved to Brenham, where he married and had a son and daughter.

== Lawman career ==
On July 1, 1870, Governor Edmund J. Davis organized a Texas State Police force, naming McNelly one of its four captains. The new police force had an inauspicious start, as its first director promptly ran away with $34,000. Many of the officers were accused of killing prisoners and harassing voters. In his most visible job as part of the State Police, McNelly was assigned to Walker County. An African-American man named Sam Jenkins had been murdered after telling a grand jury that he had been flogged. McNelly investigated the crime and arrested four men, one of whom was immediately released. The other three had smuggled weapons, and they opened fire as McNelly was returning them to jail. McNelly was wounded, and in a newspaper interview he later castigated the local sheriff for not finding the weapons. McNelly was also unhappy with Davis, who had promptly declared martial law. The State Police force was abolished on April 22, 1873.

The Democratic Party regained control of Texas in 1873, and in 1874, to combat massive lawlessness, the newly elected governor, Richard Coke, created two branches of the Texas Rangers, a Frontier Battalion under the command of major John B. Jones, and a designated Special Force, commanded by McNelly, financed by cattle ranchers. McNelly's special group had the specific task of bringing order to the Nueces Strip, a hotbed of cattle thievery and banditry, where Juan Cortina, the Mexican military chief for the Rio Grande frontier, was conducting periodic guerrilla operations against the local ranchers.

One of his unit's first assignments was to travel to DeWitt County and resolve the Sutton–Taylor feud. The feud had begun in March 1874 when a member of the Taylor family killed a member of the Sutton family. McNelly and 40 Rangers arrived in Clinton, Texas, on August 1 and remained for four months to ensure that Taylor and the witnesses against him lived through the trial. Following that incident, McNelly was ill, and went home to recuperate on his cotton farm near Burton. There is a contemporary report that six members of McNelly's unit were engaged in a gunfight with unknown parties six miles from Clinton on the Yorktown Road, which resulted in one missing, one wounded, and two horses killed.

== Nueces Strip ==
In April 1875, Coke ordered McNelly to organize a special force and go to Nueces County. In two days, McNelly recruited 41 men. He rejected most native Texans who had applied so that they would not have to face the possibility of shooting at their own relatives or friends. The group became very loyal to him, and called themselves the "Little McNellys".

McNelly's methods had been questioned throughout the years, and although he recovered many cattle stolen from the Texan ranches while aggressively dealing with lawlessness on the Mexican border, he had also gained a reputation of taking part in many illegal executions, and confessions forced from prisoners by extreme torture methods - such as skinning people alive. "There the Rangers would put the rope over the captives neck and torture him by cutting him slowly to expose and pull out his intestines or by skinning him alive." McNelly carried a Bible to rationalize his extermination of those he saw not fit to live. Ironically, it was through his Bible readings, that McNelly regarded most Mexicans as a race permanently warped by a hereditary flaw.

McNelly also made himself famous for disobeying direct orders from his superiors on several occasions, and breaking through the Mexican frontier for self-appointed law enforcement purposes. His actions proved to be effective, however, and he was responsible for putting an end to the troubles with Mexican bandits and cattle rustlers along the Rio Grande that were commonplace during the 1850–75 period.

It was in 1875 that McNelly was faced with how to eliminate several Mexican bandit gangs. The first of these gang leaders was Juan Nepomuceno Cortina, who had been a General in the Mexican army during the Mexican–American War. For years Cortina had raided settlements in the Brownsville, Texas, area, always retreating across the Rio Grande to avoid Texas law enforcement. Cortina was from a wealthy aristocratic Spanish family that owned more than 886,000 acres of land in that area, which had once included the location of the town of Brownsville. Cortina commanded a force in excess of 2,000 armed Mexicans and gunmen. The land Cortina was fighting for was the 1792 San Juan de Carricitos Grant (601,000 acres) and the 1781 Espíritu Santo Grant (285,000 acres) both granted by the kings of Spains to his forefathers. The land today is part of the King Ranch and the Kenedy ranch.

Further north up river, McNelly was faced with a gang led by Juan Flores Salinas. This gang did not have the manpower of the Cortina's gang, but was nonetheless as ruthless. This gang was headquartered at Camargo, Mexico, directly across the border from the US Cavalry outpost of Ringgold Barracks, near Rio Grande City.

From among American outlaws, McNelly's greatest rival was Texas gunman King Fisher and his band of outlaws. Although notable as rustlers, Fisher's band rarely raided US civilian populations, concentrating more on rustling cattle from their Mexican counterparts across the border. This added to tensions among the Mexican population, and gave an excuse for Mexican bandits to raid in the United States.

McNelly now moved south to end the bandit gangs that had run unchecked over that area for several years. Within one year's time, McNelly had completely destroyed both the bandit bands led by Cortina and by Salinas, by repeated actions where McNelly disobeyed orders and took his force across the border into Mexico. King Fisher's gang dispersed; Fisher went into retirement as a rancher, following a Ranger raid on his ranch during which McNelly arrested him. The two came to an agreement that Fisher's over-the-border raids would cease. Fisher later became Sheriff of Uvalde County.

== Palo Alto ==
The first major gunfight between the Rangers and Mexican bandits occurred in June 1875. McNelly's Rangers surprised a group of sixteen Mexican cattle thieves and one American man, driving about 300 head of cattle toward the Rio Grande, and also toward Juan Cortina, and a steamer headed for Cuba. They were Cortina's hand-picked men, who had boasted they could cope with any Rangers or vigilantes. Captain McNelly issued his orders. "Don't shoot to the left or the right. Shoot straight ahead. And don't shoot till you've got your target good in your sights. Don't walk up on a wounded man. Pay no attention to a white flag. That's a mean trick bandits use on green-hands. Don't touch a dead man, except to identify him."

Spying the Rangers, the Mexicans took flight, driving the herd before them at a frenzied pace, until they reached a little island in the middle of a salt marsh. The Mexicans then turned and waited for the Rangers, who were right on their heels, to cross the shallow, muddy lagoon. But McNelly anticipated the ambush and stopped to issue his pep talk, "Boys, across this resaca are some outlaws that claim they're bigger than the law—bigger than Washington law, bigger than Texas law. This won't be a standoff or a dogfall. We'll either win completely, or we'll lose completely."

The battle, which has since been called the "Red Raid," or the "Second Battle of the Palo Alto," was waged nearly all day in a succession of single hand-fights, which left dead Mexicans and horses covering a swath through the prairie about two miles wide and six miles long. All the Mexican drovers were killed, as well as a gringo, Jack Ellis, who had beaten and mistreated a shopkeeper's wife at Nuecestown. Two hundred and sixty-five head of stolen stock were rounded up and eventually returned to their rightful owners in the neighborhood of the King Ranch country. Nine of the fourteen saddles recovered turned out to be Dick Heyes' saddles stolen in the raid on Nuecestown three months earlier.

== Las Cuevas War ==
Leander McNelly's most infamous exploit was his invasion of Las Cuevas, Mexico in order to get back stolen cattle. McNelly and his Rangers entered Mexico on November 20, 1875. Under cover of brush and scrub oak, they made their way on foot to General Juan Flores Salinas' stronghold at the Rincon de Cucharas outpost of the Las Cuevas ranch, which in English means "The Spoon Corner." Later that afternoon, Major A. J. Alexander from Ringgold Barracks arrived with a missive from Colonel Potter at Fort Brown, on the Rio Grande at Brownsville, urging McNelly to retreat. During the gunfight, McNelly was shot through both hands.

After a needed night's sleep, Captain McNelly moved his men directly opposite Camargo on the Texas side of the Rio Grande. Thus, in another invasion of Mexico, twelve or thirteen Rangers, not including McNelly – though accounts differ – crossed the river in a rowboat. McNelly marched up the riverbank to the customs house and demanded the cattle. When the Mexican Captain stalled by politely saying they didn't do business on Sunday, he promptly took the Mexican Captain prisoner, hauling him to the Texas side of the border. He told the Mexican leader to get the cattle started back to the U.S. side within the hour or he would die. The operation was successful, and instead of 250 head returning to Texas, more than 400 were crossed back.

== Death ==
McNelly suffered from tuberculosis, and retired in 1876 due to deteriorating health. He died on September 4 of the following year in Burton, Texas.

== Legacy ==
In World War II, the United States Liberty ship SS L. H. McNelly was named in his honor.

== In popular culture ==
In an episode of the radio show, "Inheritance" Captain McNelly (misspelled as McNally) is played by Lloyd Talbott in an episode dramatizing the formation of the Special Forces unit of the Texas Rangers. The Original Radio Broadcast aired June 13, 1954.

In the episode of the NBC TV series Tales of Wells Fargo entitled "Sam Bass" (1957) the character Captain McNelly is played by Ray Teal.

In the episode of the TV show Kung Fu entitled "Empty Pages of a Dead Book" (1974) actor Robert Foxworth portrays a fictionalized son of Captain McNelly, Clyde McNelly, who tracks down men who at one time were pursued by the elder McNelly.

Don Meredith guest stars as the title character in "Shanklin," an episode of the TV series The Quest. Shanklin, a high-ranking Texas Ranger, is loosely inspired by McNelly, and the incidents depicted in the episode have their counterparts in McNelly's actual career in as a lawman.

The film Texas Rangers (2001) fictionalizes the exploits of McNelly and his Rangers on the Nueces Strip, and is based on the autobiographical account of the campaign, Taming the Nueces Strip by former Texas Ranger George Durham, who served on McNelly's "Special Force." McNelly is played by Dylan McDermott. Ashton Kutcher plays Durham.
