= List of songs about Ohio =

List of songs about the U.S. state Ohio

This is a list of songs written about the U.S. state of Ohio:

Title	Artist/composer	Album	Date	Description
"Back Home"	The Beach Boys	15 Big Ones/Made in California	1976	
"Beautiful Ohio"	Ballard MacDonald		1918	Made the official state song of Ohio in 1969.
"Big Butter Jesus"	Heywood Banks	We Just Landed!	2007	Refers to the King of Kings statue near Monroe, Ohio, which was destroyed by a lightning strike on June 14, 2010.
"Bloodbuzz Ohio"	The National	High Violet	2010	
"Boy in Ohio"	Phil Ochs	Greatest Hits	1970	
"Burn On"	Randy Newman	Sail Away	1971	
"Carmen Ohio"	Fred Cornell		1903	The oldest school song still in use by Ohio State University.
"Carry Me Ohio"	Sun Kil Moon	Ghosts of the Great Highway	2003	The song's narrative is partly based on frontman Mark Kozelek's boyhood in Ohio.
"Cleveland Rocks"	Ian Hunter	You're Never Alone with a Schizophrenic	1979	A cover version was used as the theme song for The Drew Carey Show in the 1990s.
"Cuyahoga"	R.E.M.	Life's Rich Pageant	1986	About the once-heavily polluted Cuyahoga River; the lyrics reference when it caught fire in 1969, which became a watershed incident in the environmental movement.
"Dayton Ohio, 1903"	Randy Newman	Sail Away	1971	
"Dreamy Bruises"	Sylvan Esso	Sylvan Esso	2014	
"Escape from Ohio"	Electric Six	Kill	2009	
"Four Days"	Counting Crows	This Desert Life	1999	
"The Girl from Ohio"	Outlaws	Lady in Waiting	1976	
"Going to Cleveland"	The Mountain Goats	Transmissions to Horace	1993	
"In Ohio"	Joseph Arthur	Our Shadows Will Remain	2004	
"In Ohio on Some Steps"	Limbeck	Hi, Everything's Great.	2003	
"Lisbon, OH"	Bon Iver	Bon Iver, Bon Iver	2011	
"Look At Miss Ohio"	Gillian Welch	Soul Journey	2003	
"Look Out Cleveland"	The Band	The Band	1970	
"Mrs. Hippopotamus"	Relient K	Air For Free		
"My City Was Gone"	The Pretenders	single	1982	The song is an autobiographical lament about the singer returning to her childhood home in Ohio and discovering that rampant development and pollution had destroyed the "pretty countryside" of her youth; the lyrics make specific references to places in and around Akron, Ohio, the hometown of lead singer and writer Chrissie Hynde.
"My Ohio Home"	Gus Kahn and Walter Donaldson		1927	
"Nowhere, Ohio"	Can't Swim	Thanks but No Thanks	2023	
"O-HI-O (O-My-O)"	Al Jolson		1920	
"Ohio"	Leonard Bernstein, et al.		1953	From the Broadway musical Wonderful Town, about two sisters who move to New York City from Columbus, Ohio; in the song, they lament leaving.
"Ohio"	Crosby, Stills, Nash & Young	single	1970	Written by Neil Young in reaction to the 1970 Kent State Shootings, after he saw the photos of the incident in Life Magazine. Charted at #14 on Billboard Hot 100.
"Ohio"	Isabelle Adjani	Pull Marine	1983	Song in French by actress Isabelle Adjani, written by Serge Gainsbourg.
"Ohio"	Modest Mouse	This Is A Long Drive For Someone With Nothing To Think About	1996	
"Ohio"	Chixdiggit!	Born on the first of July	1998	
"Ohio"	Cherry Glazerr	Stuffed & Ready	2019	
"Ohio"	Damien Jurado	Rehearsals for Departure	1999	
"Ohio"	Over the Rhine	Ohio	2003	
"Ohio"	The Black Keys	Brothers (bonus track)	2011	
"Ohio"	Justice (band)	Audio, Video, Disco	2011	
"Ohio"	Kingswood	Microscopic Wars	2013	
"Ohio"	Caamp	Caamp	2016	
"Ohio"	Andrew McMahon in the Wilderness		2018	The single was not written for an album; it was released digitally in May 2018.
"Ohio (Come Back to Texas)"	Bowling for Soup	A Hangover You Don't Deserve	2005	
"Ohio Is for Lovers"	Hawthorne Heights	The Silence in Black and White	2004	
"Ohioisonfire"	Of Mice & Men	The Flood	2011	
"Road Outside Columbus"	O.A.R.	In Between Now and Then	2003	
"Saturday Night in Toledo, Ohio"	John Denver	An Evening with John Denver	1975	
"Somewhere In Ohio"	The Jayhawks	Smile	2000	
"Youngstown"	Bruce Springsteen	The Ghost of Tom Joad	1995	The song tells the tale of the rise and fall of Youngstown, Ohio, over several generations, from the discovery of iron ore nearby in 1803 through the decline of the steel industry in the area in the 1970s.
