= Bowling This Month =

American bowling magazine

- Categories: Ten-pin bowling magazine
- Frequency: Monthly
- Publisher: BTM Digital Media, LLC
- Founded: 1994
- Final issue: October 2013 (print)
- Country: United States
- Based in: Monroe, Ohio
- Language: English
- Website: Bowling This Month

Bowling This Month was a Ten-pin bowling magazine which was started in 1994. Its official statement says that if you're serious about bowling and you want to improve your scoring, you need the most up-to-date technical information available on subjects ranging from advanced technique through lane play to balls and ball motion. Each month Bowling This Month delivered the comprehensive information and instruction to help you bowl better, whether you average 180 or 230. Topics included: comprehensive new equipment reviews, lane play, ball motion and reaction, tips to improve mechanics, mental conditioning, physical conditioning, and an updated ball comparison chart.

The publisher of Bowling This Month was BTM Digital Media, LLC. The headquarters was in Monroe, Ohio. The magazine stopped its print edition in October 2013, being sold and becoming digital-only.
