= Reds Legends of Crosley Field =

Coordinates: 39°5′51″N 84°30′24″W

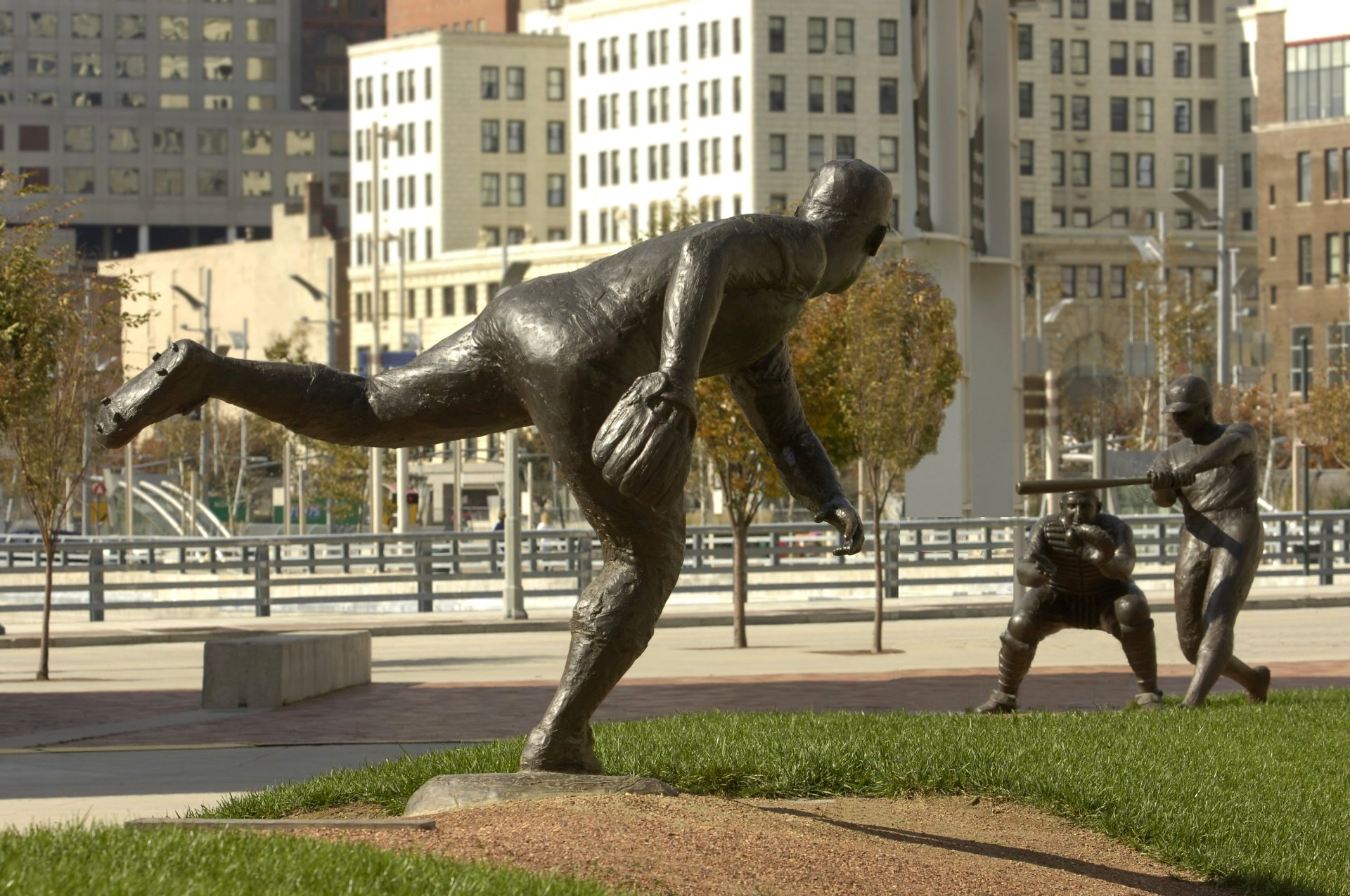
- Artist: Tom Tsuchiya
- Year: 2003-2004
- Type: Bronze
- Location: Great American Ball Park, Cincinnati

Reds Legends of Crosley Field is a group of bronze sculptures by artist Tom Tsuchiya, located at the main entrance of Great American Ball Park in Cincinnati, Ohio. The sculptures represent four Crosley Field era Cincinnati Reds players: Ted Kluszewski, Ernie Lombardi, Joe Nuxhall and Frank Robinson. These players were selected by a fan vote conducted by the Cincinnati Reds.

Kluszewski's statue was unveiled on Opening Day, March 31, 2003, to coincide with the official opening of Great American Ball Park. The statues of Nuxhall and Robinson were dedicated in the summer of that year. Subsequently, Lombardi's statue was unveiled on June 27, 2004.

== Description ==
The statues depict the four players interacting with one another in an imaginary ball game at the "Crosley Terrace", a stylized representation of the infield of Crosley Field. The sculpture group depicts Joe Nuxhall pitching to Frank Robinson, who is swinging the bat at home plate, while Ernie Lombardi crouches behind home plate, ready to catch the ball; and Ted Kluszewski observes the action from the on-deck circle. This unique presentation has been praised by both critics and the public alike.

== Gallery ==
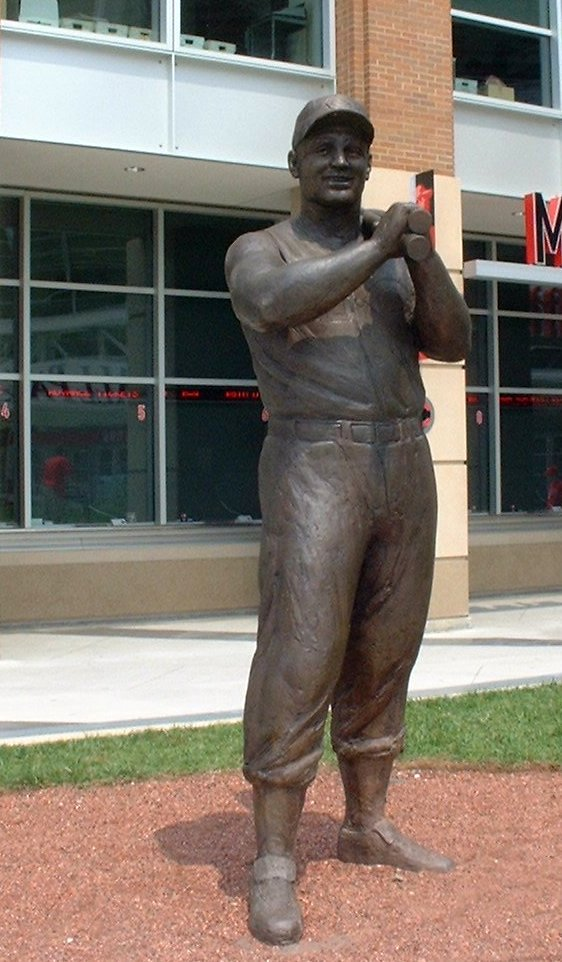
Ted Kluszewski

Legends of Crosley Field
