= Touchdown =

Means of scoring in gridiron football

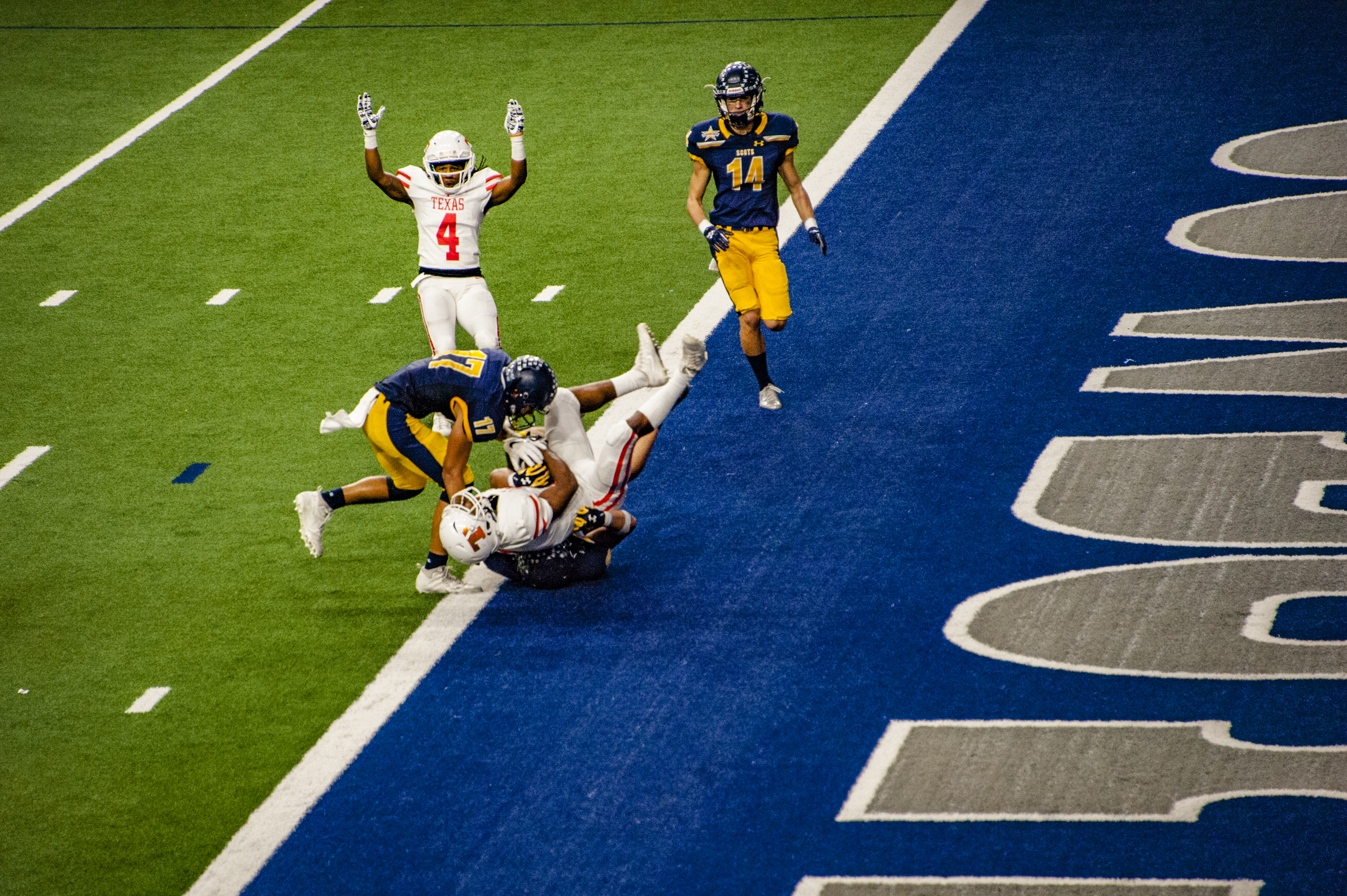
A player from Texas High School crosses the goal line with the ball during a game against Highland Park High School to score a rushing touchdown worth six points.

Devin Singletary of the Buffalo Bills rushes across the goal line with the ball during a game against the Chicago Bears at Soldier Field to score a rushing touchdown worth six points.

A touchdown (abbreviated as TD) is a scoring play in gridiron football. Scoring a touchdown grants the team that scored it 6 points. Whether running, passing, returning a kickoff or punt, or recovering a turnover, a team scores a touchdown by advancing the football into the opponent's end zone. More specifically, a touchdown is when a player is in possession of the ball, any part of the ball is in the end zone they are attacking, and the player is not down.

Because of the speed at which football happens, it is often hard for an official to make the correct call based on their vantage point alone. Most professional football leagues, such as the National Football League (NFL) and the Canadian Football League (CFL), as well as some college leagues, such as the National Collegiate Athletic Association (NCAA), allow certain types of plays, including scoring plays such as touchdowns, to be reviewed. Coaches can also challenge calls, provided they are made during a play eligible to be reviewed; the only exception is during periods of the game where coaches' challenges are restricted, such as the last two minutes of each half. The NFL and CFL review all scoring plays and turnovers regardless of whether the call was questionable, and therefore do not allow coaches to challenge those plays, either. The NCAA allows Division I FBS teams to review plays throughout the regular season and postseason, while Division I FCS teams can only use it during the playoffs, Division II teams only during the quarterfinals, semifinals, and championship game, and Division III teams only during the semifinals and championship game.

In American football and Canadian football, a touchdown is worth six points and is followed by an extra point or two-point conversion attempt.

== Description ==
To score a touchdown, one team must take the football into the opposing team's end zone. In all gridiron codes, the touchdown is scored the instant the ball touches or "breaks" the plane of the front of the goal line (that is, if any part of the ball is in the space on, above, or across the goal line) while in the possession of a player whose team is trying to score in that end zone. This particular requirement of the touchdown differs from other sports in which points are scored by moving a ball or equivalent object into a goal where the whole of the relevant object must cross the whole of the goal line for a score to be awarded. The play is dead and the touchdown scored the moment the ball touches plane in possession of a player, or the moment the ball comes into possession of an offensive player in the end zone (having established possession by controlling the ball and having one or both feet depending on the rules of the league or another part of the body, excluding the hands, touch the ground). The slightest part of the ball touching or being directly over the goal line is sufficient for a touchdown to score. However, only the ball counts, not a player's helmet, foot, or any other part of the body. Touching one of the pylons at either end of the goal line with the ball constitutes "breaking the plane" as well.

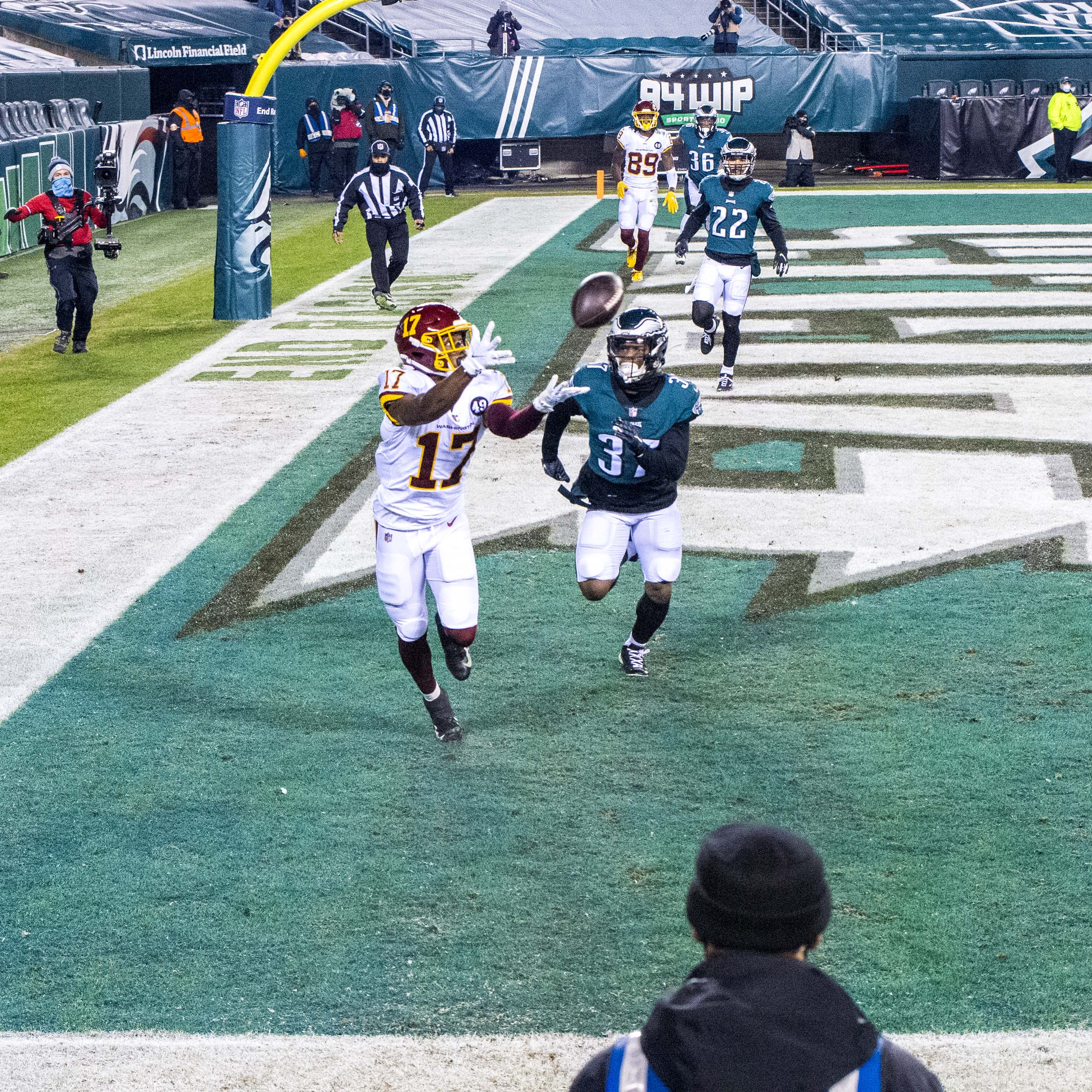
Terry McLaurin (left) of the Washington Commanders catches a pass while standing in the end zone during a 2021 game at Lincoln Financial Field to score a receiving touchdown worth six points.

Touchdowns are usually scored by the offense by running or passing the ball. The former is called a rushing touchdown, and in the latter, the quarterback throws a touchdown pass or passing touchdown to the receiver, who either catches the ball in the field of play and advances it into the end zone, or catches it while already being within the boundaries of the end zone; the result is a touchdown reception or touchdown catch. However, the defense can also score a touchdown if they have recovered a fumble or made an interception and return it to the opposing end zone. Special teams can score a touchdown on a kickoff or punt return, or on a return after a missed or blocked field goal attempt or blocked punt. In short, any play in which a player legally carries any part of the ball over or across the opponent's goal line scores a touchdown, as is any play in which a player legally gains possession of the ball while it is on or across his opponent's goal line and both the player and ball are legally in-bounds - beyond this, the manner in which he gained possession is inconsequential. In the NFL, a touchdown may be awarded by the referee as a penalty for a "palpably unfair act", such as a player coming off the bench during a play and tackling a runner who would otherwise have scored.

A touchdown is worth six points. The scoring team is also awarded the opportunity for an extra point or a two-point conversion. Afterwards, the team that scored the touchdown kicks off to the opposing team, if there is any time left in the half. In most codes, a conversion is not attempted if the touchdown ended the game and the conversion cannot affect the outcome.

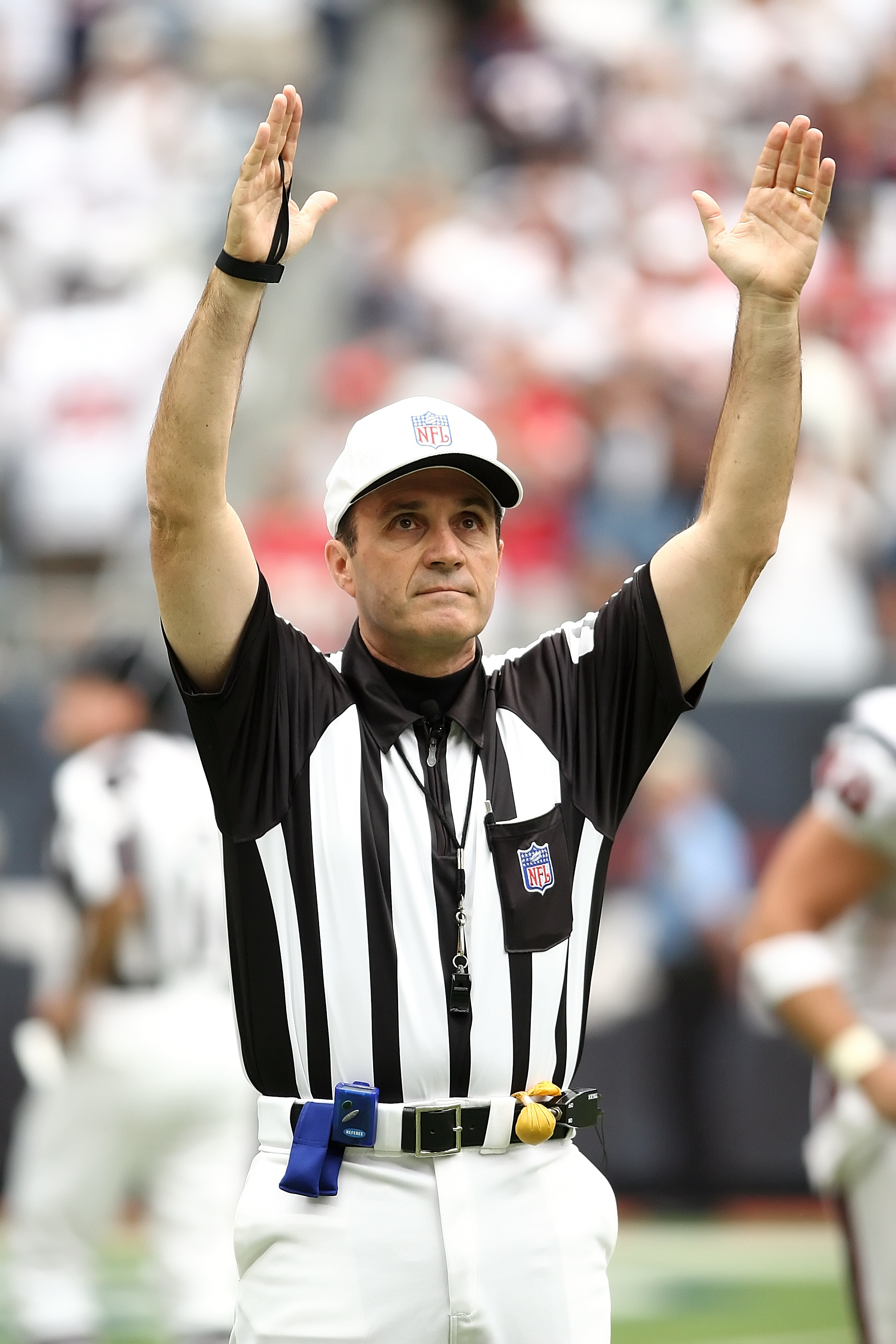
Official Pete Morelli signals a touchdown by raising both arms above his head during an NFL game in 2006.

The officials' hand signal for a touchdown is both arms extended vertically above the head, with palms facing inward—the same signal used for a field goal or conversion.

Unlike a try scored in rugby, and contrary to the event's name, the ball does not need to touch the ground when the player and the ball are inside the end zone. The term touchdown is a holdover from gridiron's early days when the ball was required to be touched to the ground as in rugby, as rugby and gridiron were still extremely similar sports at this point. This rule was changed to the modern-day iteration in 1889.

== History ==
When the first uniform rules for American football were enacted by the newly formed Intercollegiate Football Association following the 1876 Rugby season, a touchdown required touching the ball to the ground past the goal line, and counted for 1/4 of a kicked goal (except in the case of a tie) and allowed the offense the chance to kick for goal by placekick or dropkick from a spot along a line perpendicular to the goal line and passing through the point where the ball was touched down, or through a process known as a "punt-out", where the attacking team would kick the ball from the point where it was touched down to a teammate. If the teammate could fair catch the ball, he could follow with a try for goal from the spot of the catch, or resume play as normal (in an attempt to touch down the ball in a spot more advantageous for kicking). The governing rule at the time read: "A match shall be decided by a majority of touchdowns. A goal shall be equal to four touchdowns; but in case of a tie a goal kicked from a touchdown shall take precedence over four touchdowns."

- In 1881, the rules were modified so that a goal kicked from a touchdown took precedence over a goal kicked from the field in breaking ties.
- In 1882, four touchdowns were determined to take precedence over a goal kicked from the field. Two safeties were equivalent to a touchdown.
- In 1883, points were introduced to football, and a touchdown counted as two points. A goal after a touchdown counted as four points.
- In 1884, a touchdown scored four points and a goal after touchdown two points, a reversal from the previous year.
- In 1889, the provision requiring the ball to actually be touched to the ground was removed. A touchdown was now scored by possessing the ball beyond the goal line.
- In 1898, the touchdown scored five points, and the goal after touchdown added another point - hence the current terminology: "extra point". The year of this change has also been given as 1897.
- In 1900, the definition of touchdown was changed to include situations where the ball becomes dead on or above the goal line.
- In 1912, the value of a touchdown was increased to six points. The end zone was also added. Before the addition of the end zone, forward passes caught beyond the goal line resulted in a loss of possession and a touchback. The increase from five points to six did not come until much later in Canada, and the touchdown remained only five points there until 1956. In addition, the score continued to commonly be called a try in Canada until the second half of the twentieth century.

The ability to score a touchdown on the point-after attempt (two-point conversion) was added to NCAA football in 1958 and also used in the American Football League during its ten-year run from 1960 to 1969. It was subsequently adopted by high school football in 1969, the CFL in 1975, and the NFL in 1994. The short-lived World Football League, a professional American football league that operated in 1974 and 1975, gave touchdowns a seven-point value.

== See also ==
- American football scoring
- Conversion (gridiron football)
- Touchdown celebration
- Touchdown Jesus
- Touchdown pass
- Conversion
