= Touchdown Jesus =

Touchdown Jesus may refer to:

- Word of Life or Touchdown Jesus, a mural visible from Notre Dame Stadium, in Notre Dame, Indiana
- King of Kings (statue) or Touchdown Jesus, a statue that was on the east side of Interstate 75 near Monroe, Ohio
- "Touchdown Jesus", a song from Tim McGraw's Emotional Traffic album
