= Richard J. Miller =

American painter

- Born: June 23, 1923; Springville, Iowa
- Died: June 8, 2008 (aged 84); Cincinnati, Ohio
- Occupation: Sculptor

Richard J. "Dick" Miller (March 10, 1923, in Springville, Iowa – June 27, 2008) was an American sculptor, printmaker, and painter.

== Education ==
Miller was graduated A.B. from Olivet College in Olivet, Michigan, and earned an A.M. degree from Michigan State University. He was the student of sculptor Milton Horn.

== Work ==
Miller participated in national shows by the National Sculpture Society and the Audubon Artists. He was included in the New York Metropolitan Museum of Art exhibition, "American Sculpture 1951". Commissioned works were executed for Cardinal Pacelli School, Xavier University, Adath Israel Synagogue and the Cincinnati Bicentennial Commission in addition to portrait commissions.

== Teaching ==
Miller was notable for embracing the new technologies that became available throughout his career. Utilizing digital 3D modeling software, the artist began designing sculptures via computer and then rendered his sculptures based upon his models.

He taught sculpture at Oberlin College, Oberlin Ohio, and at the Art Academy of Cincinnati in Cincinnati, Ohio, 1949–1952. Artist Tom Tsuchiya was Miller's apprentice at University of Cincinnati. In 1988, he made an 8-foot-tall monument for German-American civil engineer John A. Roebling in Covington, Kentucky.
