= Lux Mundi (statue) =

Statue of jesus in Ohio

Coordinates: 39.453857°N 84.32642°W

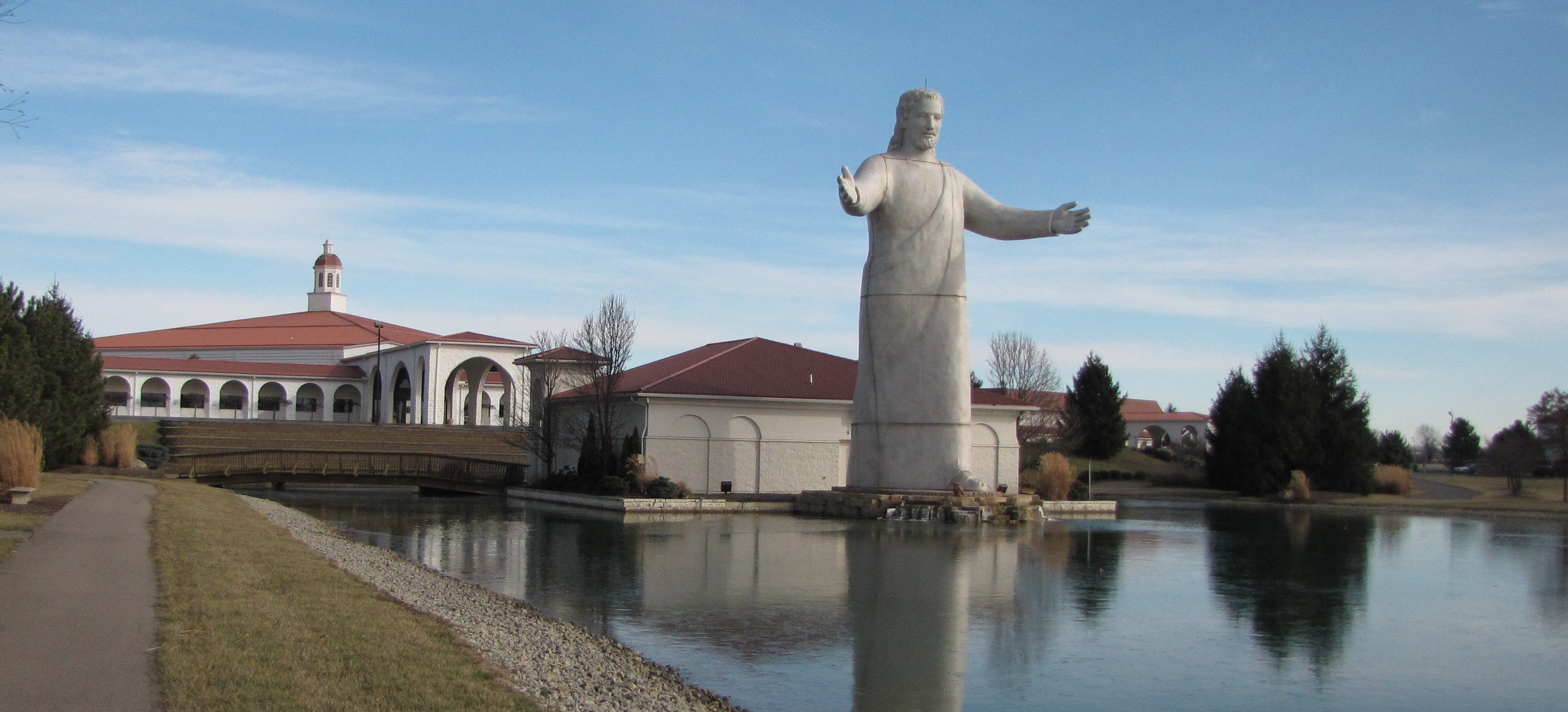
- Artist: Tom Tsuchiya
- Year: September 30, 2012
- Medium: Polymer composite, steel
- Location: Solid Rock Church, Monroe, Ohio United States

Lux Mundi (Latin for "Light of the World") is a 52-foot (15.8 m) tall statue of Jesus at Solid Rock Church, a Christian nondenominational church near Monroe, Ohio, in the United States. Designed by Tom Tsuchiya, Lux Mundi replaced the statue King of Kings which was struck by lightning and destroyed by fire in 2010.

== Design ==
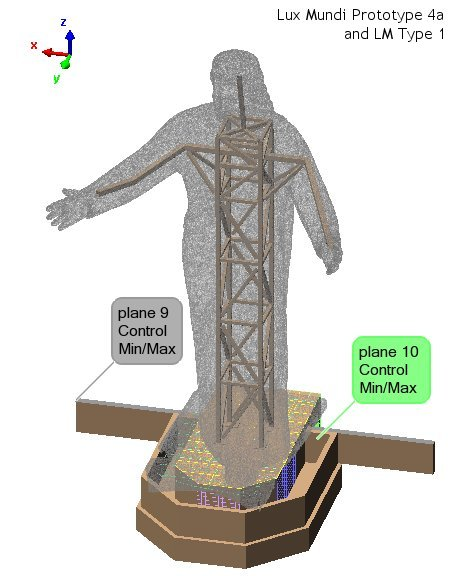
The entire structure was designed using CAD software.

The statue shows Jesus stepping forward with a welcoming gesture, a pose inspired by the Gospels of St. Matthew and St. John. Facing I-75, the statue stands on a foundation decorated by rocks with a cascading water feature.

Because of its pose and inviting quality (and in reference to its predecessor's nickname "Touchdown Jesus"), Lux Mundi has earned the nickname “Hug Me Jesus”.

== Construction ==
The polymer composite and steel sculpture is mainly fabricated by Display Dynamics of Clayton, Ohio. Since the original statue at Solid Rock Church was destroyed by fire, the new statue incorporates fire resistant materials including a lightning suppression system. Following several months of work, the major pieces of the statue were assembled together at the site on September 19, 2012, and it was dedicated eleven days later.

== See also ==
- List of statues of Jesus
- List of tallest statues
- List of the tallest statues in the United States
