= Tom Tsuchiya =

American sculptor

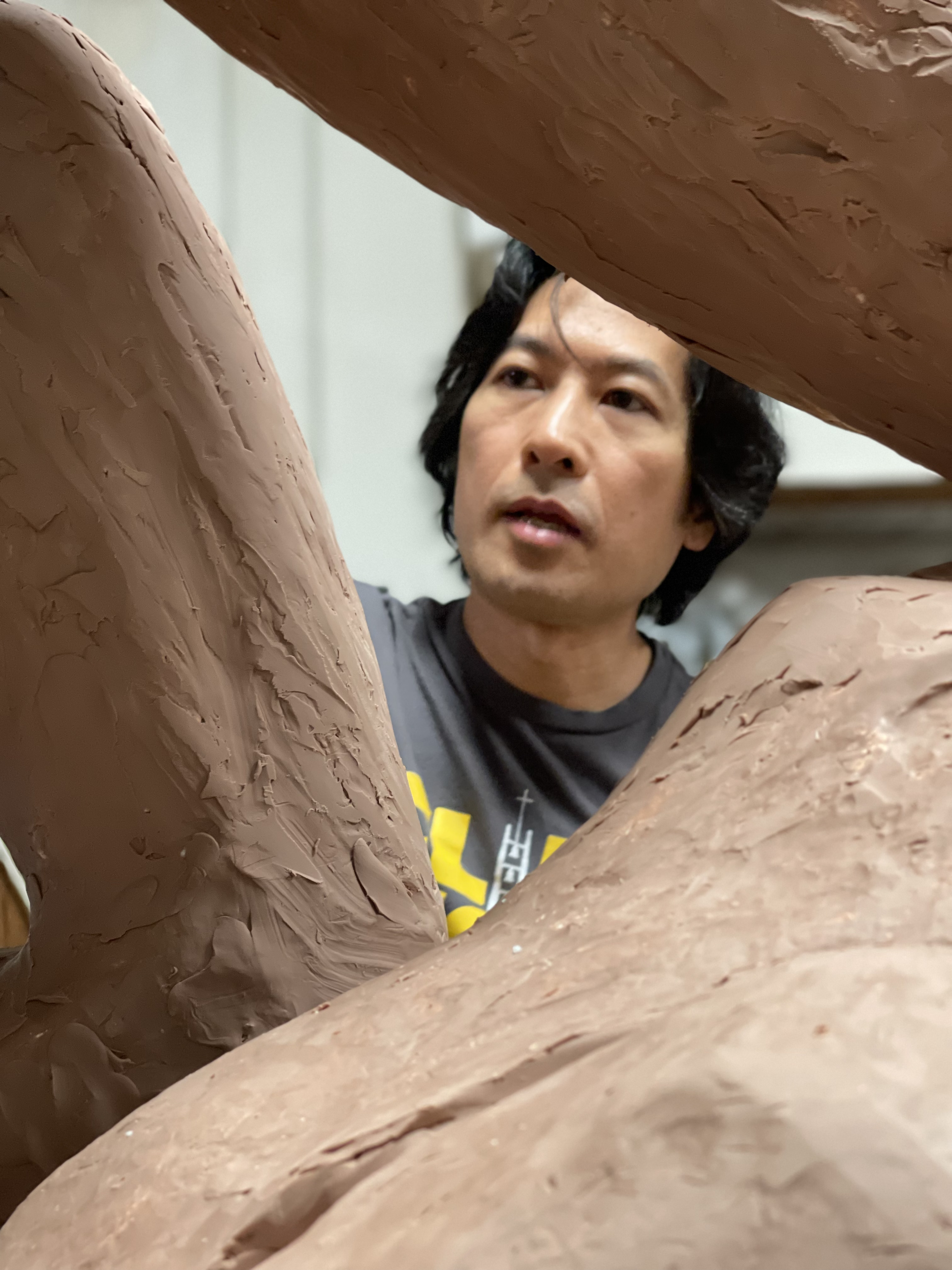
- Born: August 3, 1972
- Education: Apprentice to Richard J. Miller
- Known for: sculpture
- Website: www.tomsculptor.com

Tom Tsuchiya also known as Norikazu (born August 3, 1972) is an American artist who creates public sculpture. He is best known for bronze sculptures for Major League Baseball and the National Football League. In 2016, Tom was commissioned by Josh Rooney, the Director of Sports & Entertainment at Matthews International to produce the National Baseball Hall of Fame and Museum plaque bas-reliefs for Ken Griffey Jr. and Mike Piazza.

== Works ==
=== Reds Legends of Crosley Field ===
Tsuchiya created four life-size bronze sculptures of Cincinnati Reds players at Great American Ball Park in Cincinnati, Ohio, U.S.. These sculptures, depicting Crosley Field era players involved in an imaginary ballgame, represent Joe Nuxhall pitching to Frank Robinson, Ernie Lombardi catching and Ted Kluszewski on deck. All four sculptures were completed by 2004.

=== Madden Most Valuable Protectors Award ===
In 2009, Tsuchiya was commissioned to design and sculpt the Madden Most Valuable Protectors Award to honor the NFL's best offensive line. He created this bronze trophy as a departure from the traditional award design, integrating figures of the players into the trophy's base. On February 3, 2010, the offensive line of New Orleans Saints became the inaugural winner of the trophy.

=== Lux Mundi ===
In September 2012, Tsuchiya completed Lux Mundi, a 15.8 meter (52 feet) tall statue of Jesus for Solid Rock Church in Monroe, Ohio. This work replaces the statue of Jesus that was destroyed by a lightning strike in June, 2010.

=== Atlas Recycled ===
In March 2010, Tsuchiya created Atlas Recycled, a sustainable art sculpture that doubles as a recycling container for aluminum cans and plastic bottles. The 2.1 meter (7 feet) tall sculpture depicts the mythical Greek Titan Atlas bearing the earth on his shoulders. In addition to being a recycling aid, Atlas itself is made mainly from reused materials. Pieces of 14 used atlases and road maps cover the entire surface of the sculpture. Most of the polymer and steel that form the structure were reused from the creation of some of the artist's previous sculptures. To celebrate Earth Day, Atlas has been exhibited in Cincinnati's Fountain Square, New York City's Grand Central Terminal and Washington D.C.'s National Mall.

=== National Baseball Hall of Fame ===
In December 2015, artist Mindy Ellis who produced a total of 76 bas-relief likeness for the National Baseball Hall of Fame induction plaques retired her commission after 20 years of service. In February 2016 Tom Tsuchiya was commissioned by Josh Rooney, the Director of Sports and Entertainment at Matthews International to produce the bas-relief likeness for Ken Griffey Jr. and Mike Piazza, and has been serving since.

=== Pete Rose statue ===
In 2017, Tsuchiya created a statue of prominent Reds outfielder Pete Rose. The larger-than-life bronze sculpture shows him in his trademark headfirst slide into base. To create this gravity-defying piece, Tsuchiya worked with GE Aviation engineers Tom Wallace and Brent Tholke on the more practical aspects. The sculpture was revealed in June 2017 and joins fellow Reds greats Frank Robinson, Johnny Bench, Joe Morgan and Tony Perez on Crosley Terrace at the Great American Ball Park.

=== Other works ===
Other notable works by Tsuchiya include the sculpture to honor slain baseball coach Cleveland Parker III. This sculpture features a relief portrait of Parker, a poem and a spiraling arrangement of representations of home plate, 1st, 2nd, and 3rd bases. At night, this sculpture announces its presence by emitting pulsating light created by digitally controlled LEDs located inside the sculpture's body. Tsuchiya collaborated with American poet Nikki Giovanni on this memorial who wrote a poem celebrating Cleveland Parker's life that is inscribed on the north side of the sculpture. Cleveland Parker was a Cincinnati youth baseball coach who was fatally struck by a stray bullet on July 12, 2005.

In September 17, 2011, the Cincinnati Reds unveiled Tsuchiya's statue of the great Reds catcher, Johnny Bench. Tsuchiya's fifth statue for Great American Ball Park is located near the entrance of the Cincinnati Reds Hall of Fame and Museum. The statue represents Bench in the act of throwing out a base runner. Johnny Bench stated that the unveiling of his statue was "his greatest moment."

Tsuchiya also made a statue of Joe Morgan that was dedicated in summer 2013.

In 2024, Tsuchiya unveiled a 5-foot translucent fiberglass sculpture entitled "Embrace No Evil". The sculpture features an LED core and music built from live Cincinnati Zoo gibbon recordings. It was installed on Court Street as the first permanent BLINK installation.

== Gallery ==
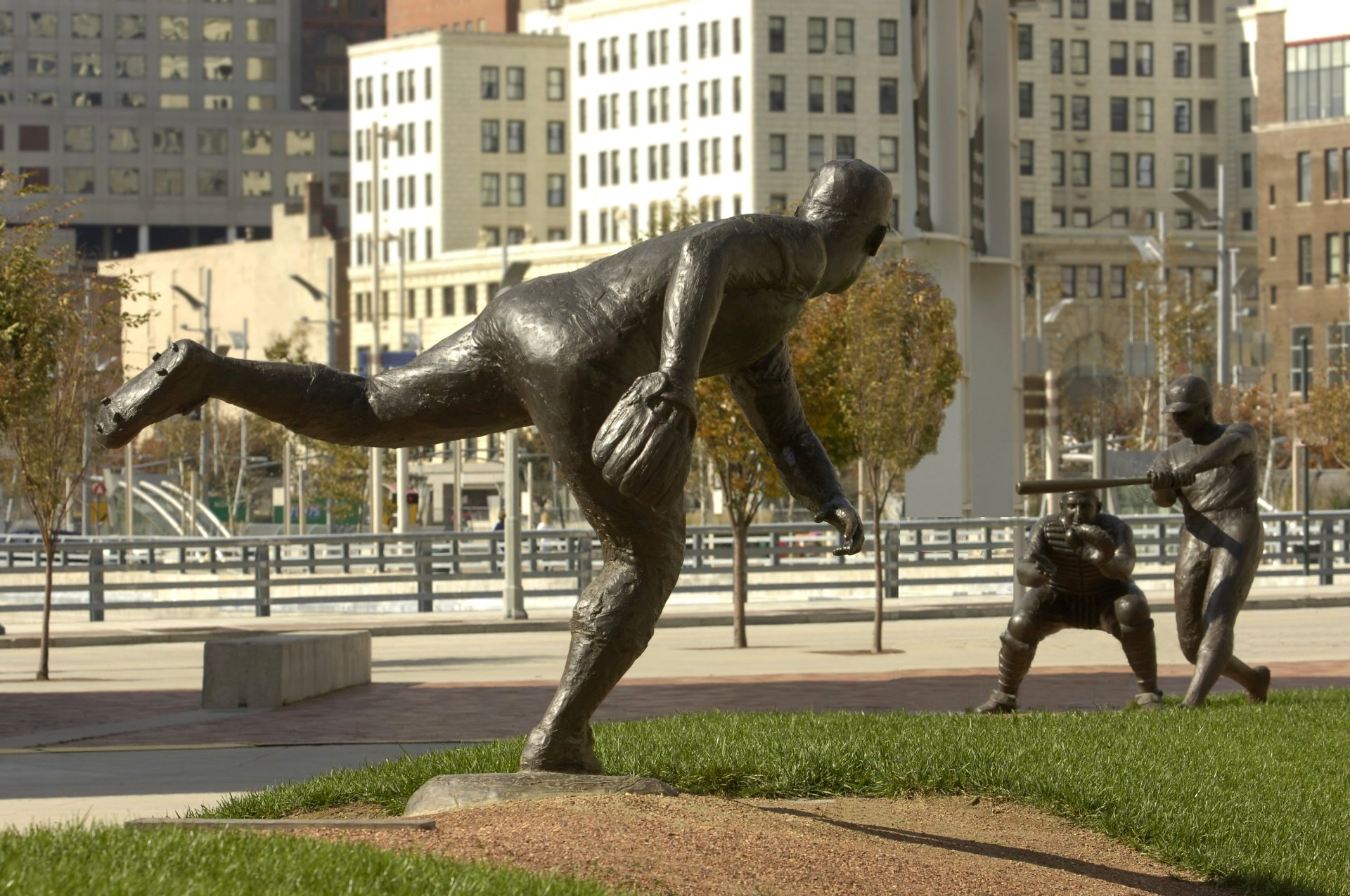
Reds Legends of Crosley Field

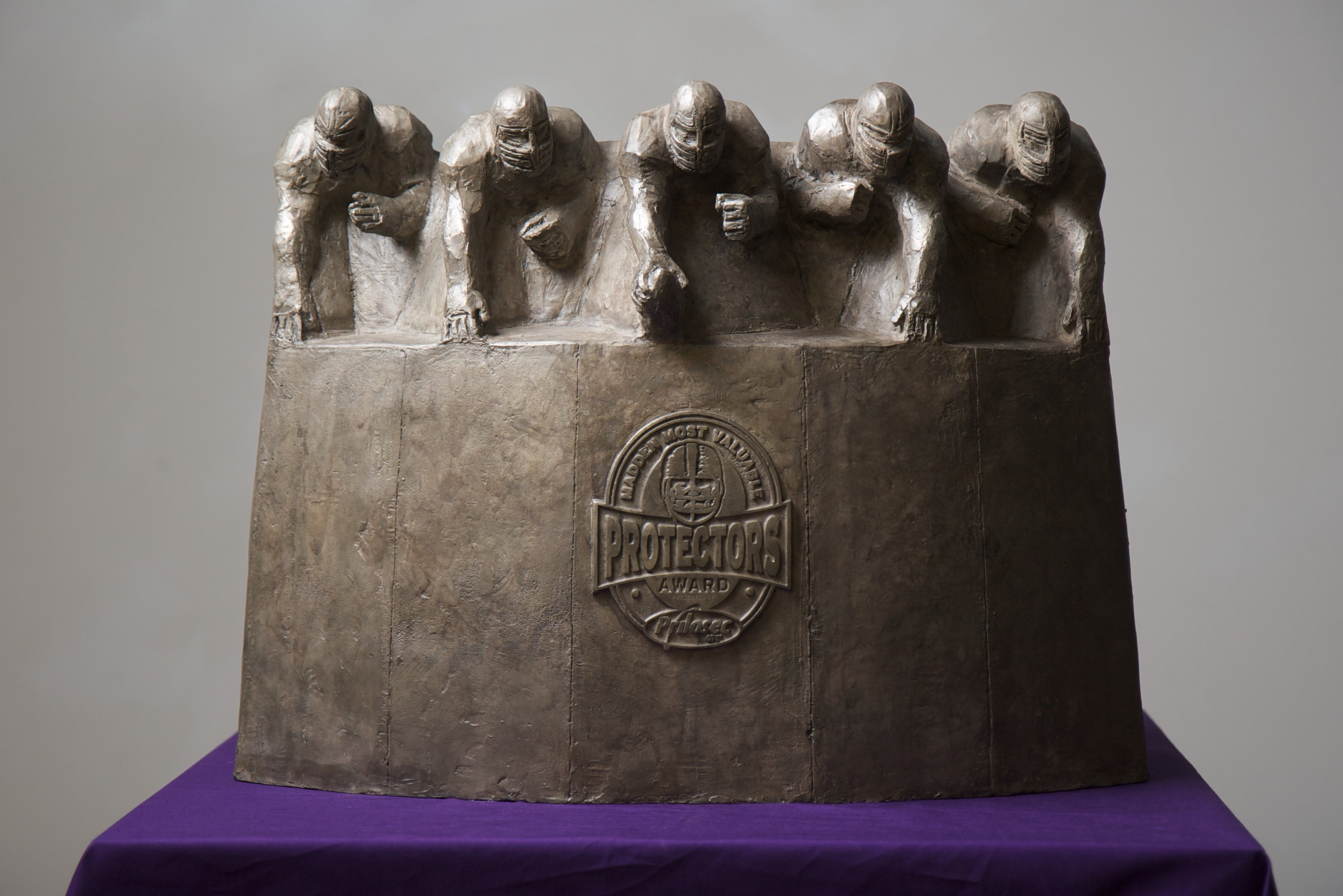
Madden Most Valuable Protectors Award

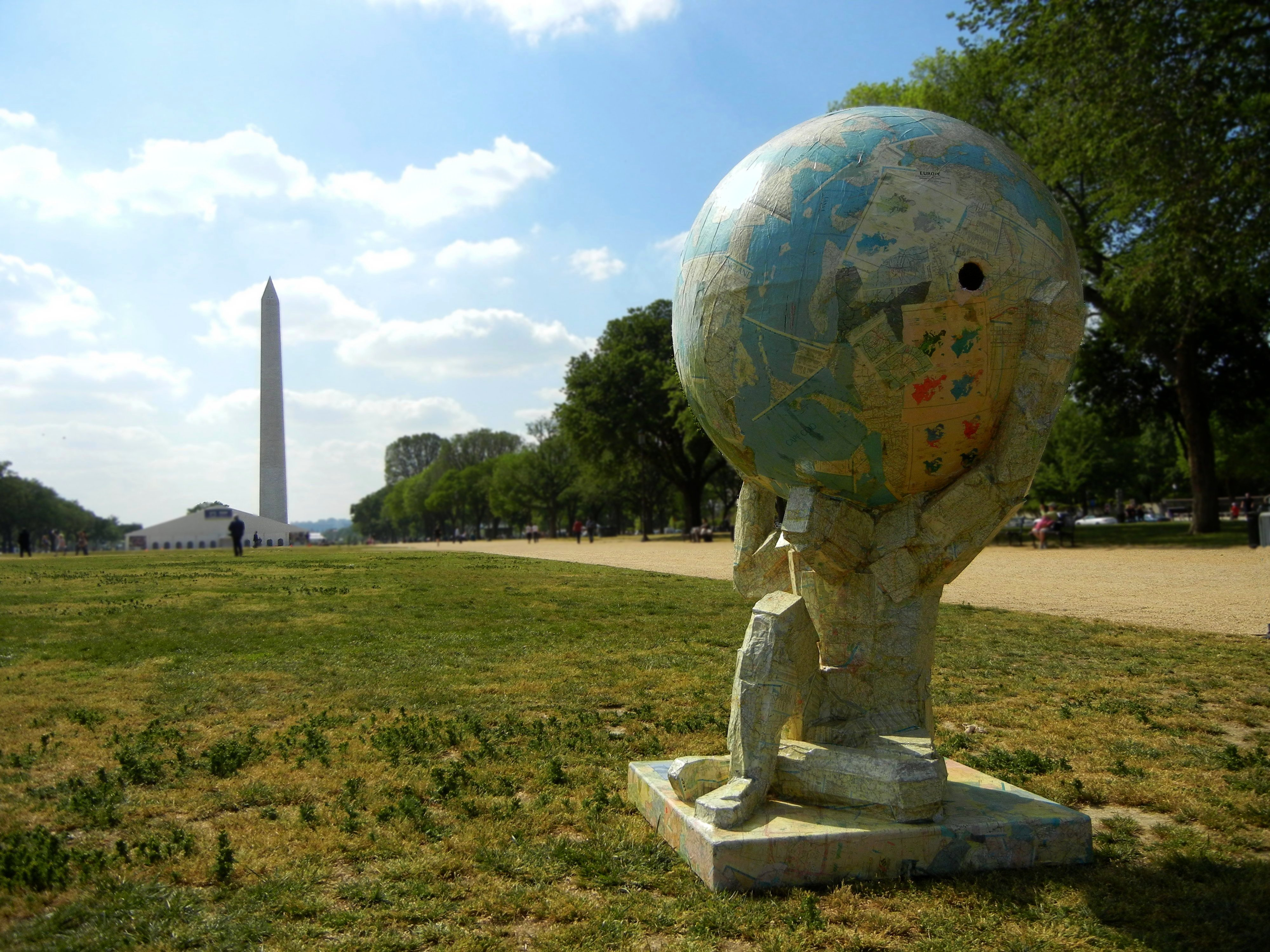
Atlas Recycled

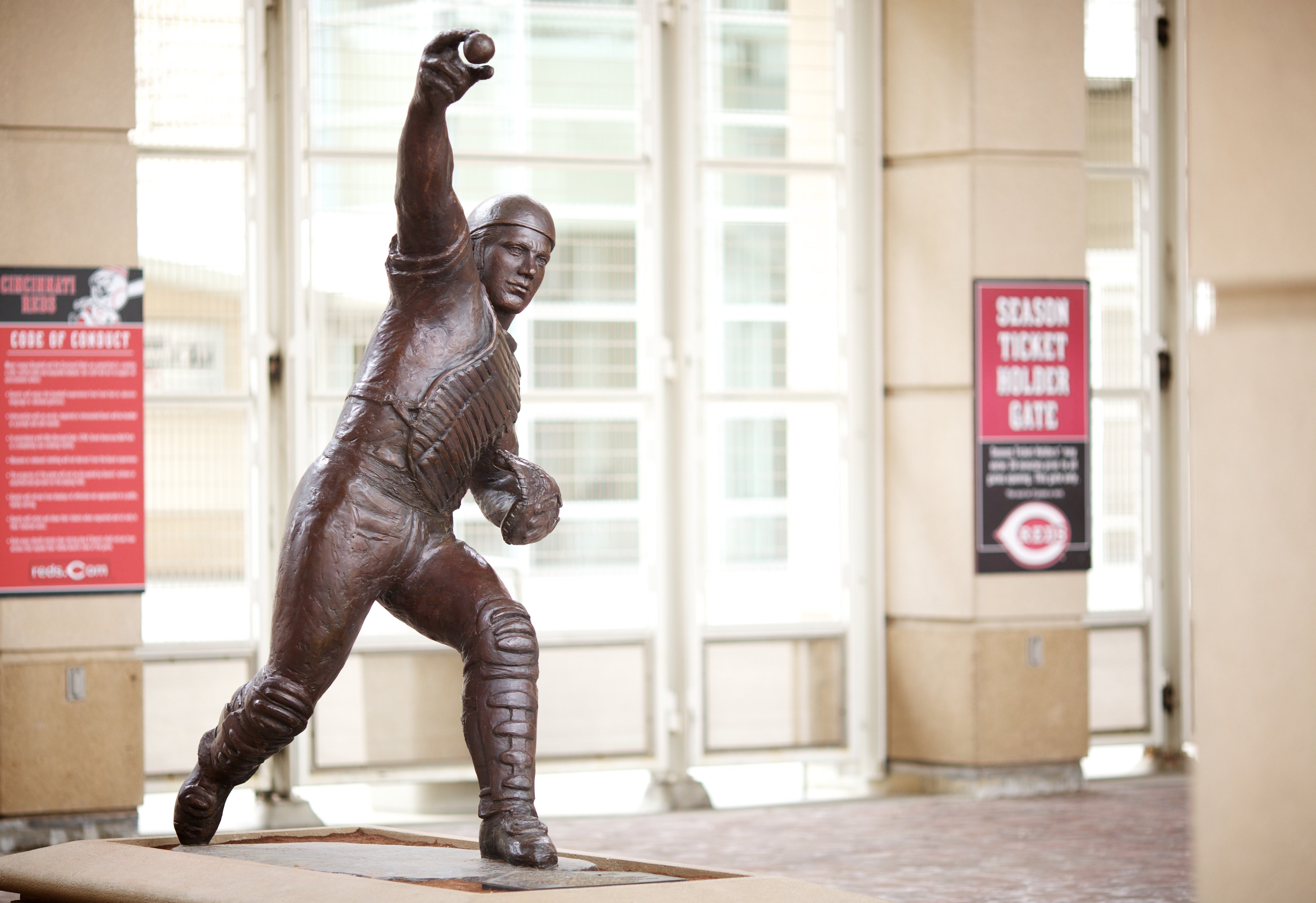
Johnny Bench: Baseball's Greatest Catcher

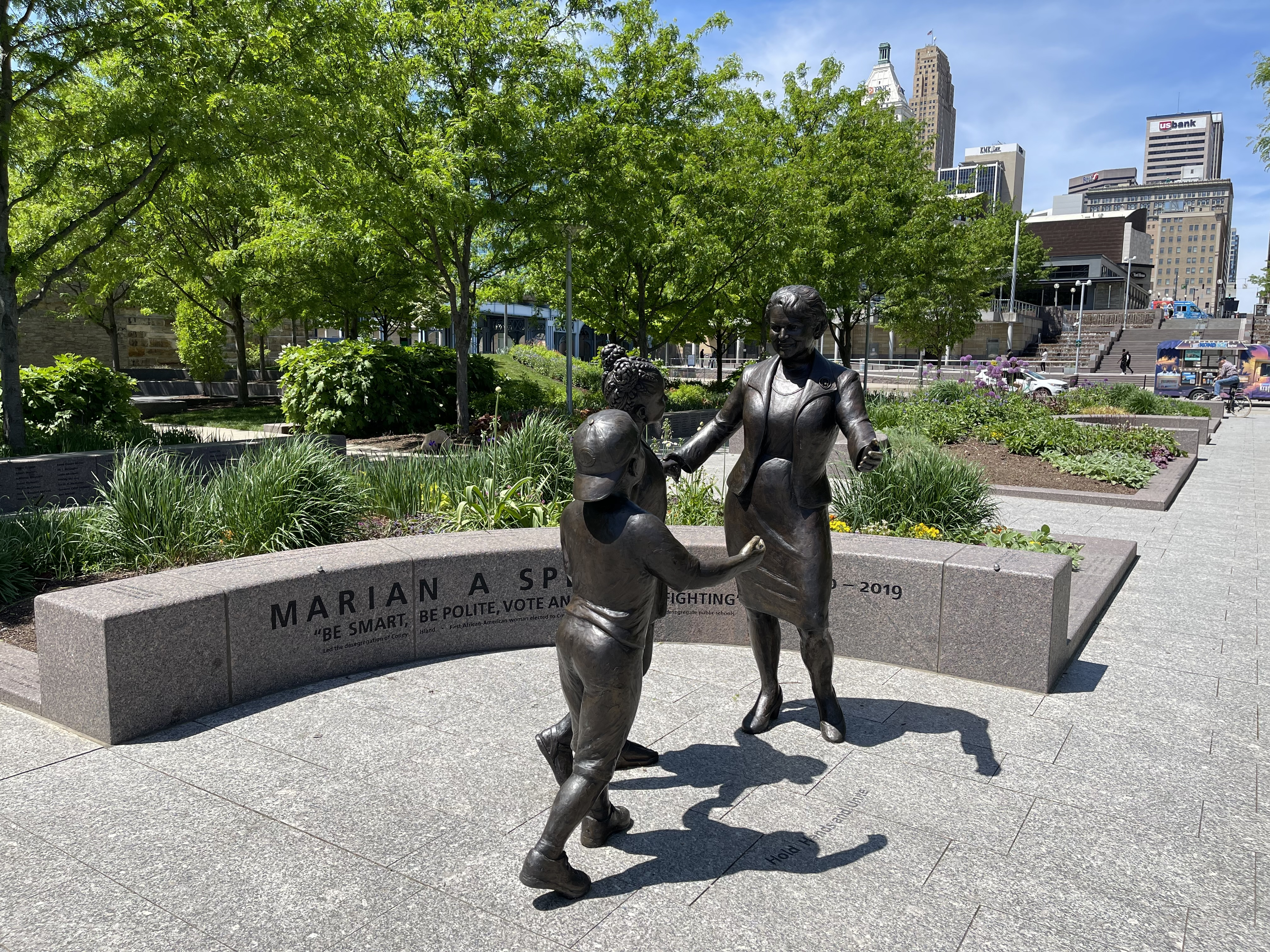
Marian Spencer Statue

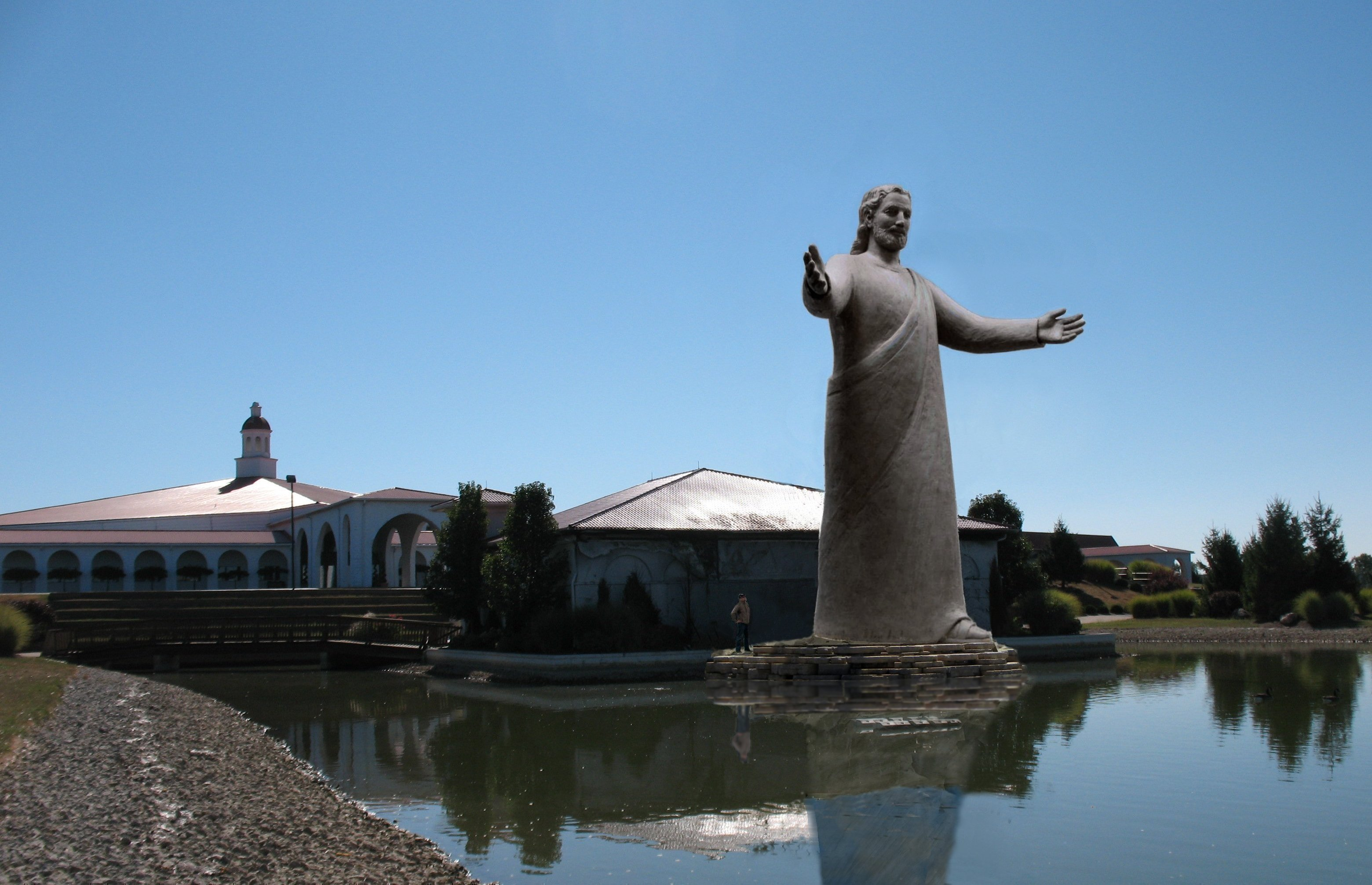
Lux Mundi, the sculpture of Jesus at Solid Rock Church

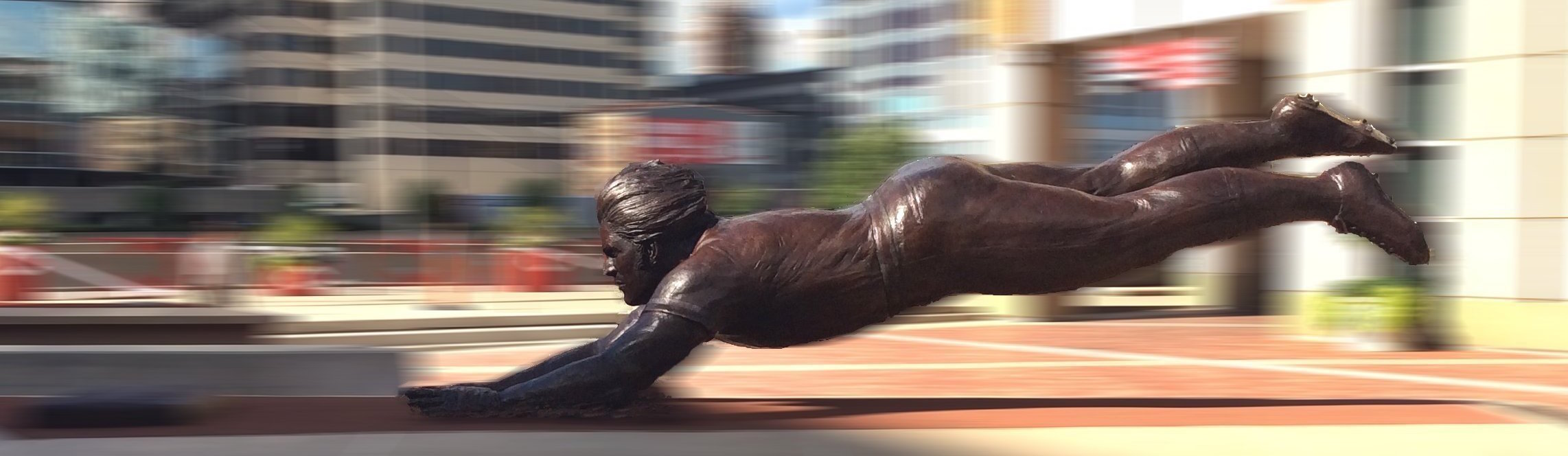
Pete Rose Statue

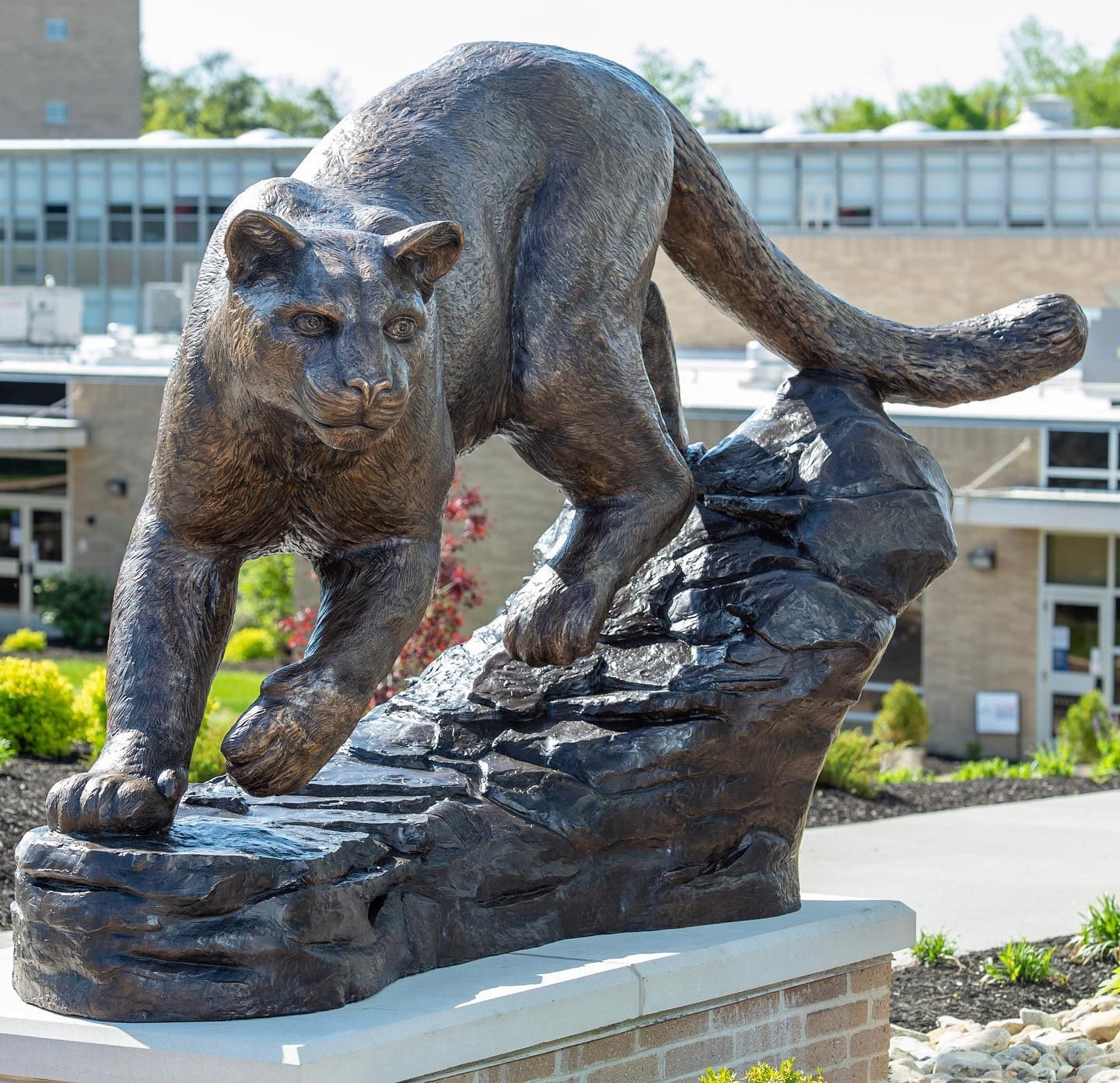
Catamount at Mount St Joseph
