= Great American Ball Park =

Baseball park in Cincinnati, Ohio

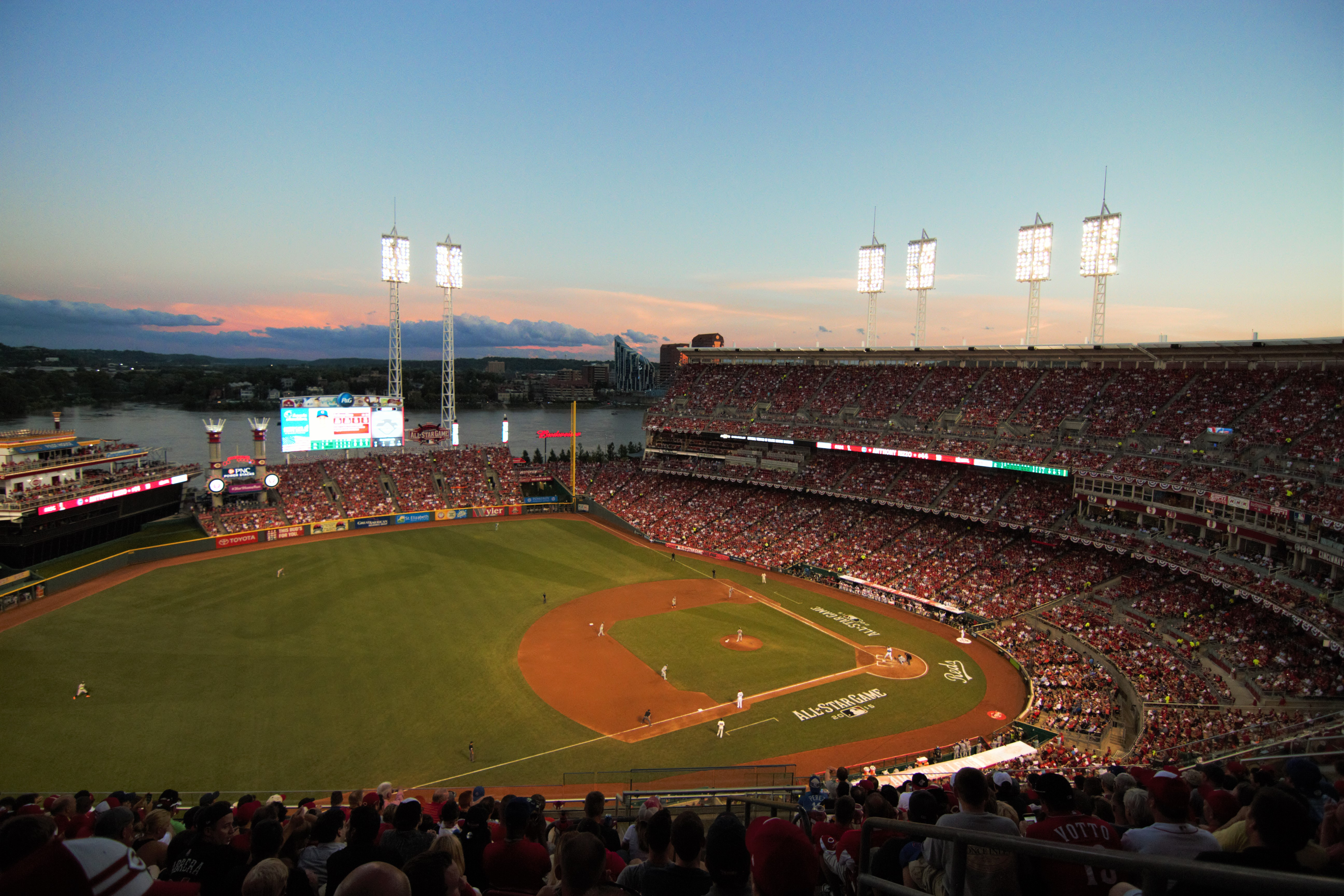
- Great American Ball Park in 2015

- Location in Ohio Location in the United States
- Address: 100 Joe Nuxhall Way
- Location: Cincinnati, Ohio, U.S.
- Coordinates: 39°5′51″N 84°30′24″W
- Owner: Hamilton County
- Operator: Cincinnati Reds
- Capacity: 43,500 (2021–present); 42,319 (2008–2020); 42,271 (2003–2007)
- Surface: Kentucky Bluegrass
- Record attendance: 44,599 (2010 NLDS, Game 3)
- Field size: Left Field – 328 ft (100 m); Left-Center – 379 ft (116 m); Center Field – 404 ft (123 m); Right-Center – 370 ft (110 m); Right Field – 325 ft (99 m); Backstop – 55 ft (17 m)
- Public transit: Connector at The Banks; Metro, TANK; Red Bike
- Parking: 850 spaces

Construction
- Groundbreaking: August 1, 2000
- Opened: March 31, 2003
- Cost: US$290 million ($508 million in 2025 dollars)
- Architect: HOK Sport/GBBN Architects
- Project manager: Parsons Brinckerhoff, Inc.
- Structural engineers: Geiger & THP Ltd.
- Services engineers: M-E Engineers, Inc.
- General contractor: Hunt Construction Group, Inc.
- Main contractors: RLE Construction, Inc.

Tenant
- Cincinnati Reds (MLB) (2003–present)

Website
- mlb.com/reds/ballpark

Great American Ball Park is a baseball stadium in Cincinnati, Ohio, United States. It is the ballpark of Major League Baseball's Cincinnati Reds, and opened on March 31, 2003, replacing Cinergy Field (formerly Riverfront Stadium), the Reds' former ballpark from 1970 to 2002. Great American Insurance bought the naming rights to the new stadium at US$75 million for 30 years.

== History ==
=== Planning and funding ===
In 1996, Hamilton County voters passed a ½% sales tax increase to fund the construction of new venues for both the Reds and the Cincinnati Bengals of the National Football League (NFL). According to the lease agreement, the Reds owed $2.5 million in rent annually for years 1–9 to Hamilton County, and owe $1 annually for years 10–35 of the contract. The Reds and the Bengals had previously shared occupancy of Riverfront Stadium, but by the mid-1990s, they complained that the multi-purpose stadium lacked amenities necessary for small-market professional sports teams to compete and each lobbied for venues of their own. Nearby Paycor Stadium broke ground in 1998 and was opened on August 19, 2000.

=== Design and construction ===
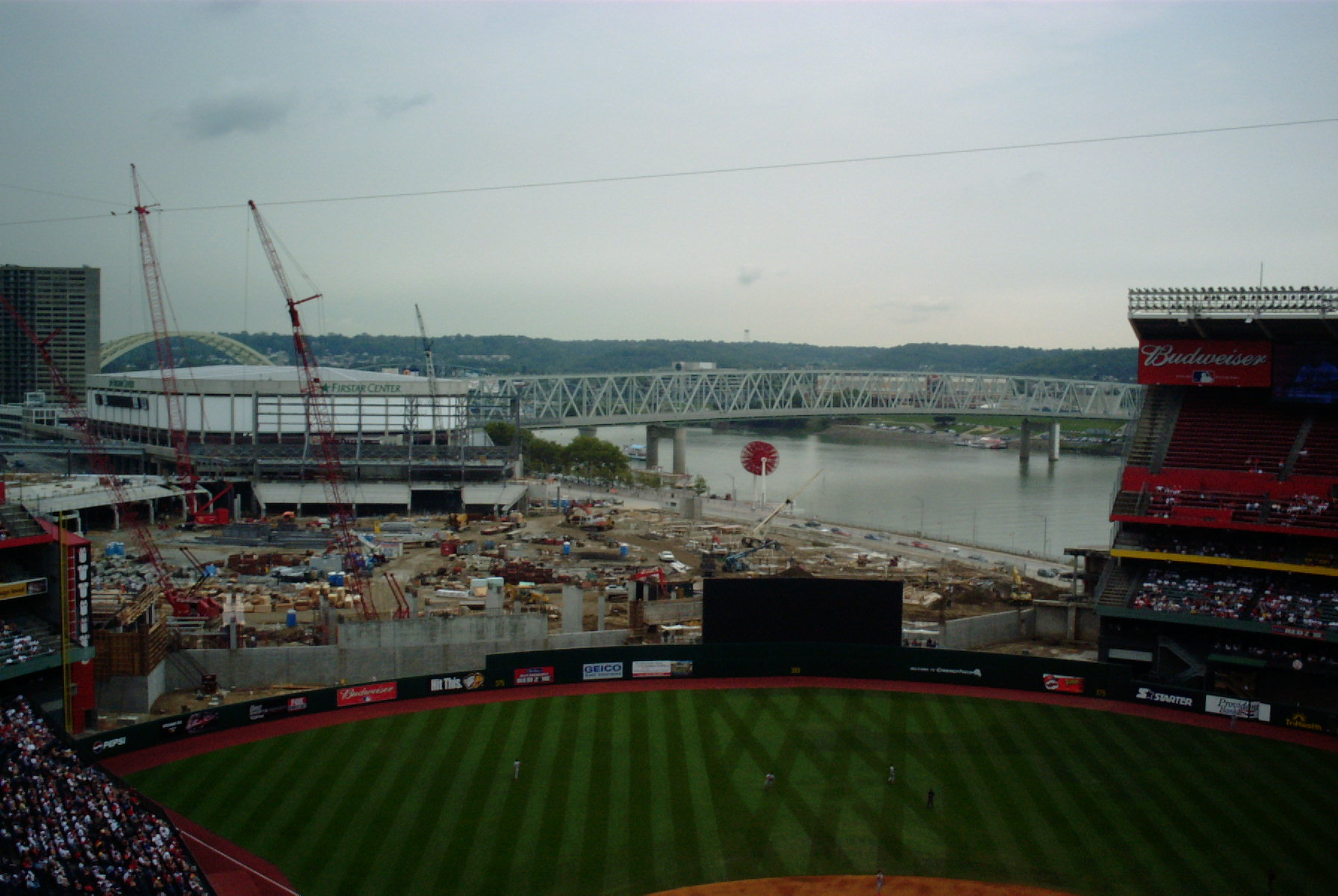
August 2001: Construction of Great American Ballpark in its early stages

Great American Ball Park was built by the architectural firms HOK Sport (now Populous) and GBBN at a cost of approximately US$290 million. It is located on the plot of land between the former site of Riverfront Stadium (currently, The Banks mixed-use development) and Heritage Bank Center (previously, U.S. Bank Arena, previously Riverfront Coliseum). The limited construction space necessitated the partial demolition of Cinergy Field. It was fully demolished on December 29, 2002.

=== 2015 All-Star Game ===
The ballpark hosted the 2015 Major League Baseball All-Star Game. The Reds put in $5 million for improvements, which included two new bars and upgraded concession stands.

== Features ==
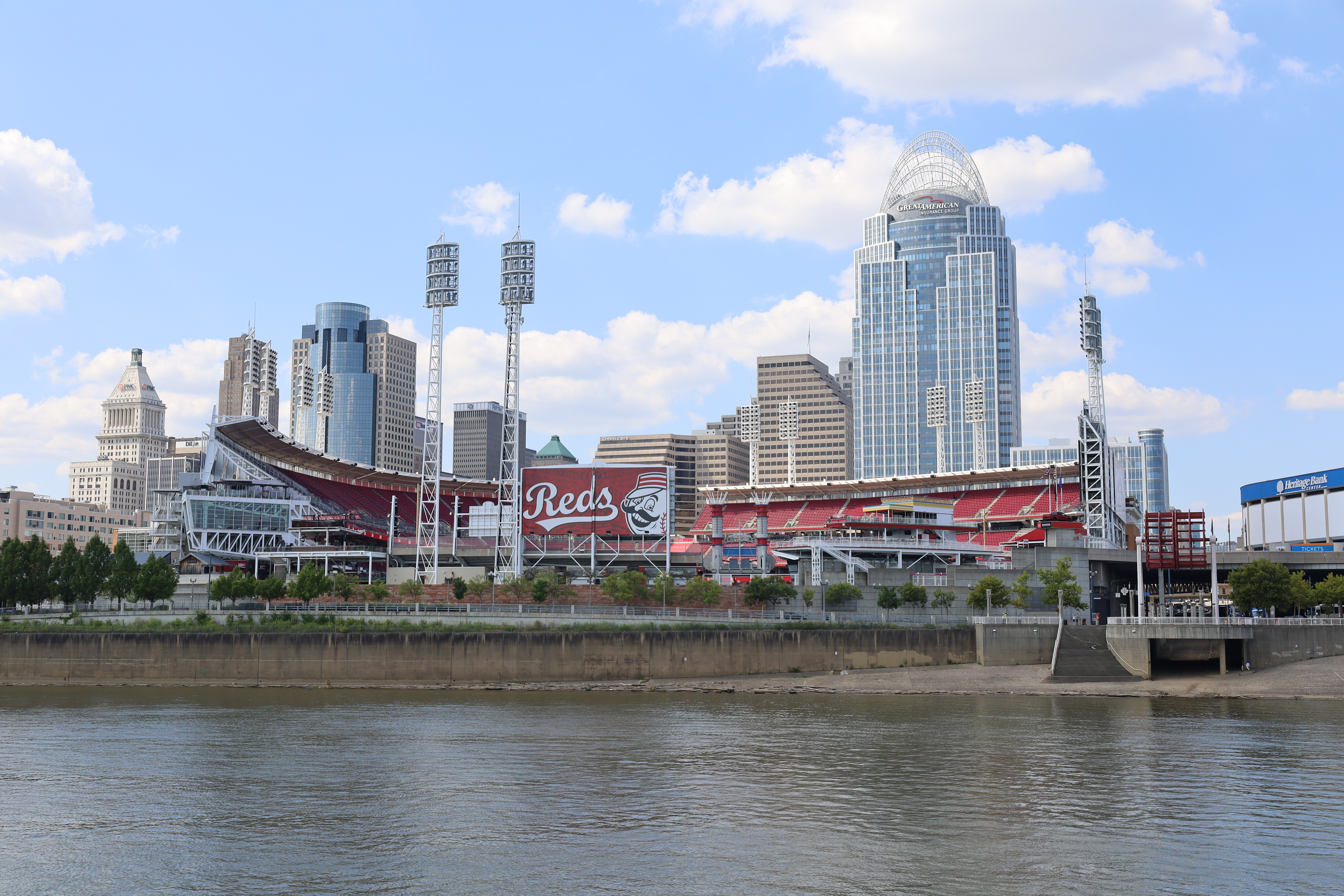
The ballpark viewed from the river in 2022

The original address of Great American Ball Park was 100 Main Street. However, after the death of former pitcher and longtime broadcaster Joe Nuxhall in 2007, the address was changed to 100 Joe Nuxhall Way. A sign bearing Nuxhall's traditional signoff phrase "rounding third and heading for home" is located on the third base side exterior of the park. The Cincinnati Reds Hall of Fame and Museum is adjacent to Great American Ball Park. In honor of Crosley Field, the Cincinnati Reds' home park from 1912 to June 1970, a monument reminiscent of the park's infamous left field terrace was built on the main entrance plaza on Joe Nuxhall Way; statues of Crosley-era stars Nuxhall, catcher Ernie Lombardi, first baseman Ted Kluszewski, and outfielder Frank Robinson are depicted playing an imaginary baseball game. The distance to center field is the exact same distance as the distance to center field at the Reds' former home, Riverfront Stadium.

=== The Gap ===
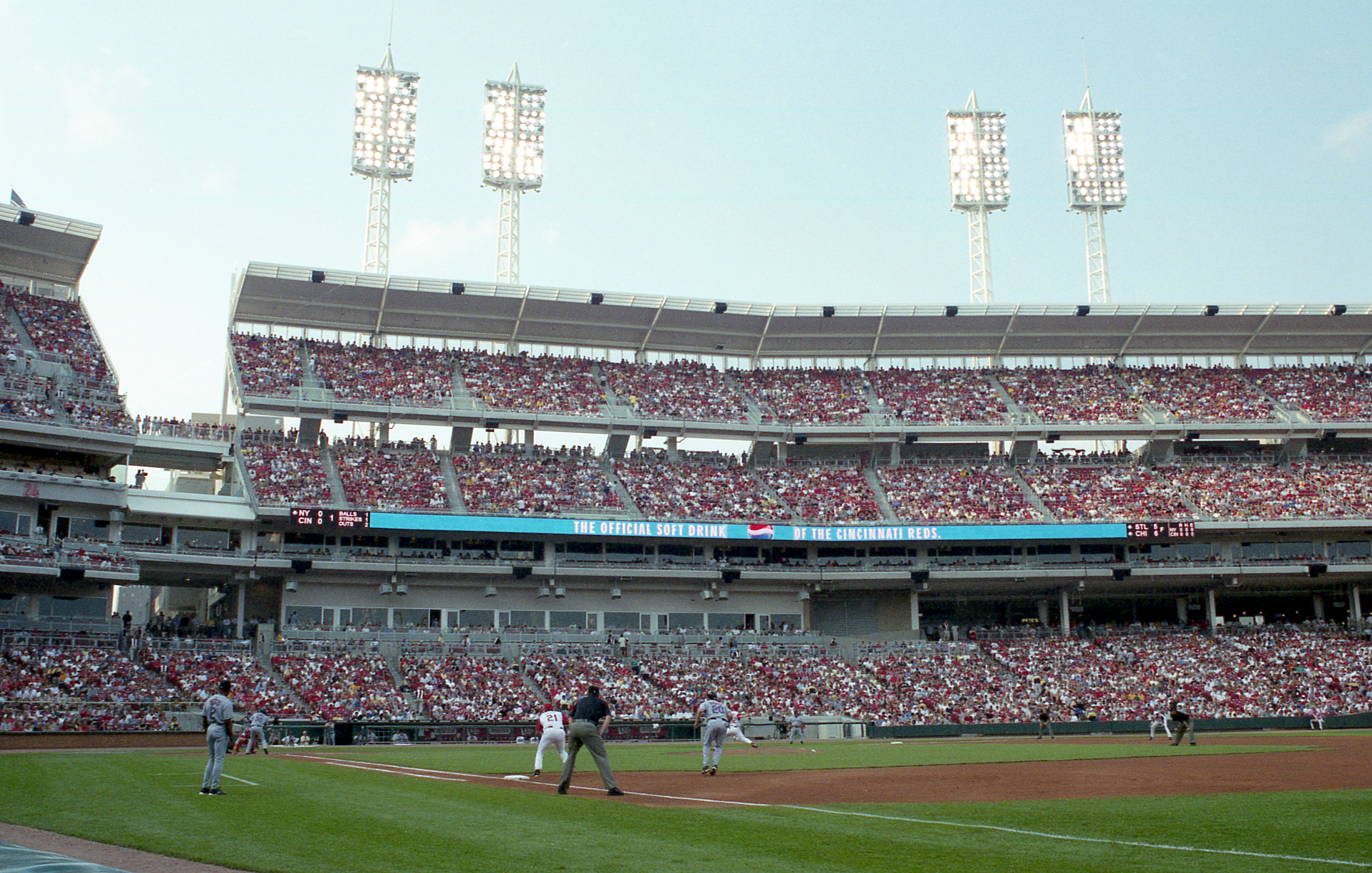
A view of Great American Ball Park, including The Gap

A 35-foot-(10.7-m)-wide break in the stands between home plate and third base called "The Gap" or "Gapper's Alley" is bridged by the concourse on each level (see photo). Aligned with Sycamore Street, it provides views into the stadium from downtown and out to the skyline from within the park.

=== Power Stacks ===
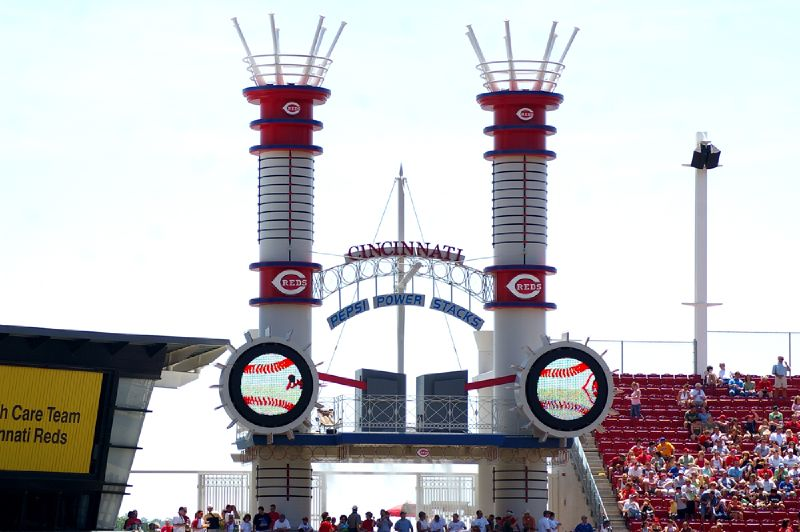
The centerfield "smokestacks"

In right center field, two smokestacks, reminiscent of the steamboats that were common on the Ohio River in the 19th and early 20th centuries, flash lights, emit flames and launch fireworks to incite or respond to the home team's efforts. When the Reds strike out a batter, fire blows out of the stacks beginning with the 2012 season (previously, steam was spewed out following a strikeout). Fireworks are launched from the stacks after every Reds home run and win. The seven baseball bats featured on both smokestacks symbolize the #14 of Pete Rose. On May 15, 2015, a part of the top of the right smokestack caught on fire during the 6th inning of a Reds game, caused by a loose propane valve, causing smoke to be blown across the field, several sections of seats to be evacuated, and the Cincinnati Fire Department being called to put it out. No one was injured.

=== The Spirit of Baseball ===
A 50-foot-by-20-foot (15 x 6 m) Indiana limestone bas relief carving near the main entrance features a young baseball player looking up to the heroic figures of a batter, pitcher and fielder, all set against the background of many of Cincinnati's landmarks, including the riverfront and Union Terminal. Local designers and artist created the piece between 2001 and 2003 with concept, design and project oversight / management by Berberich Design. The illustrative artist was Mark Riedy, the sculptors of the scale model used for fabrication were Todd Myers and Paul Brooke with fabrication by Mees Distributors.

=== Mosaics ===
Just inside the main gates off the Crosley Terrace are two mosaic panels measuring 16 feet (4.9 m) wide by 10 feet (3.0 m) high. The mosaics depict two key eras in Reds history: "The First Nine", the 1869 Red Stockings who were the first professional baseball team in history with a record of 57–0 in their first season and "The Great Eight", the famous Big Red Machine that won back-to-back World Series in 1975 and 1976. The mosaics were created between 2001 and 2003 with concept, design and project oversight / management by Berberich Design. The illustrative artist was Mark Riedy. These mosaic panels are made of opaque glass tiles and were produced in Ravenna, Italy by SICIS.

=== Scoreboard ===
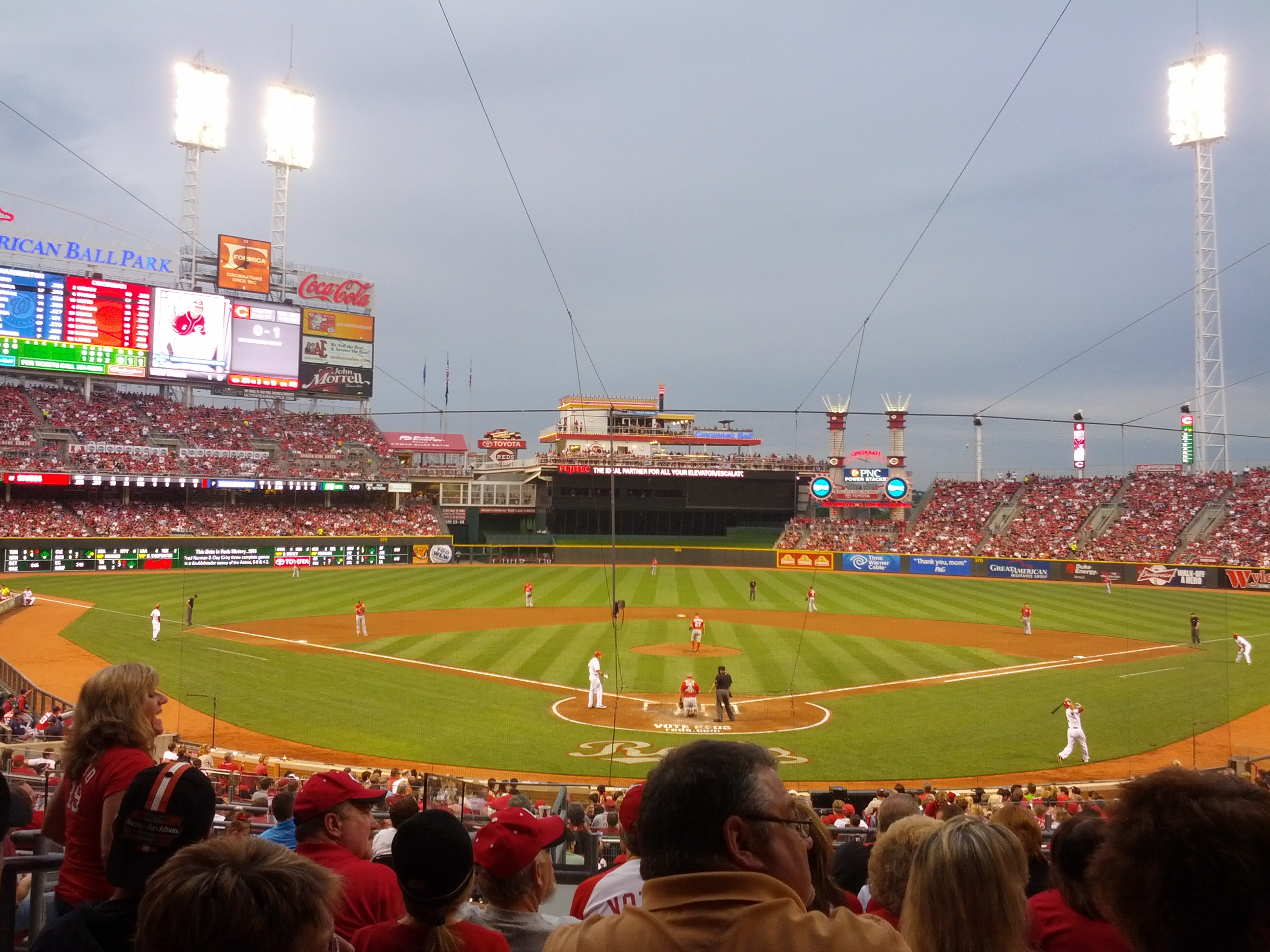
View from behind home plate

At 215 feet (66 m) wide by 40 feet (12 m) high, the scoreboard is the ninth largest in Major League Baseball. This scoreboard was originally built by the Trans-Lux company in 2003, and featured a monochrome scoreboard in addition to a smaller color videoboard, as well as five banners for sponsors. After the Trans-Lux company collapsed in 2008, the Reds paid $4 million to install a new, LED scoreboard and HD video screen from Daktronics in time for the 2009 season. The scoreboard was replaced with a full-color videoboard as part of these renovations and was capable of showing HD video. The sponsor banners were moved to the sides of the scoreboard, and an additional one was added. The scoreboard clock was originally a replica of the Longines clock at Crosley Field, but has since been modified. The scoreboard was replaced in 2020 with a larger videoboard as part of a general overhaul of the videoboards in Great American Ball Park. The sponsorship banners on the right side were replaced with additional video space. All of the videoboards throughout the facility are capable of showing high dynamic range (HDR) content, thus making it the first MLB facility with a fully integrated HDR video system.

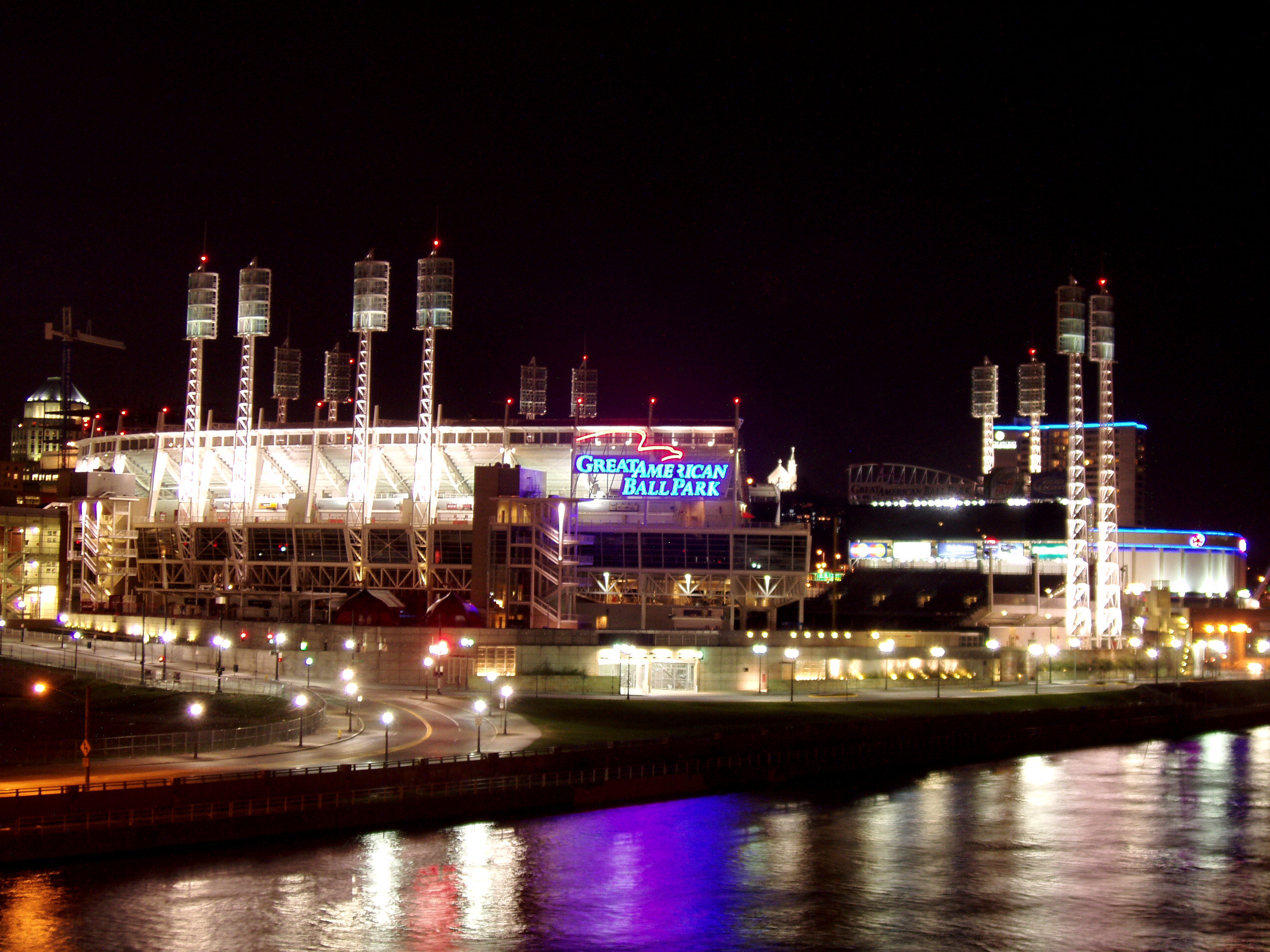
Great American Ball Park at night

=== Home Run Deck ===
If a Reds player hits the "Hit Me" sign located between the Power Stacks located in right field, a randomly selected fan will win the red Toyota Tundra pickup truck located on top of an elevator shaft approximately 500 feet (150 m) from home plate beyond the center field fence, which is valued at approximately US$31,000.

=== Crosley Terrace ===
Crosley Terrace statues

As a nod to Crosley Field, the Reds' home from 1912 to 1970, a monument was created in front of the main entrance to highlight the park's famous left-field terrace. Bronze statues of Crosley-era stars Joe Nuxhall, Ernie Lombardi, Ted Kluszewski, and Frank Robinson (created by sculptor Tom Tsuchiya) are depicted playing in an imaginary ballgame. The grass area of the terrace has the same slope as the outfield terrace at Crosley Field.

=== 4192 mural ===
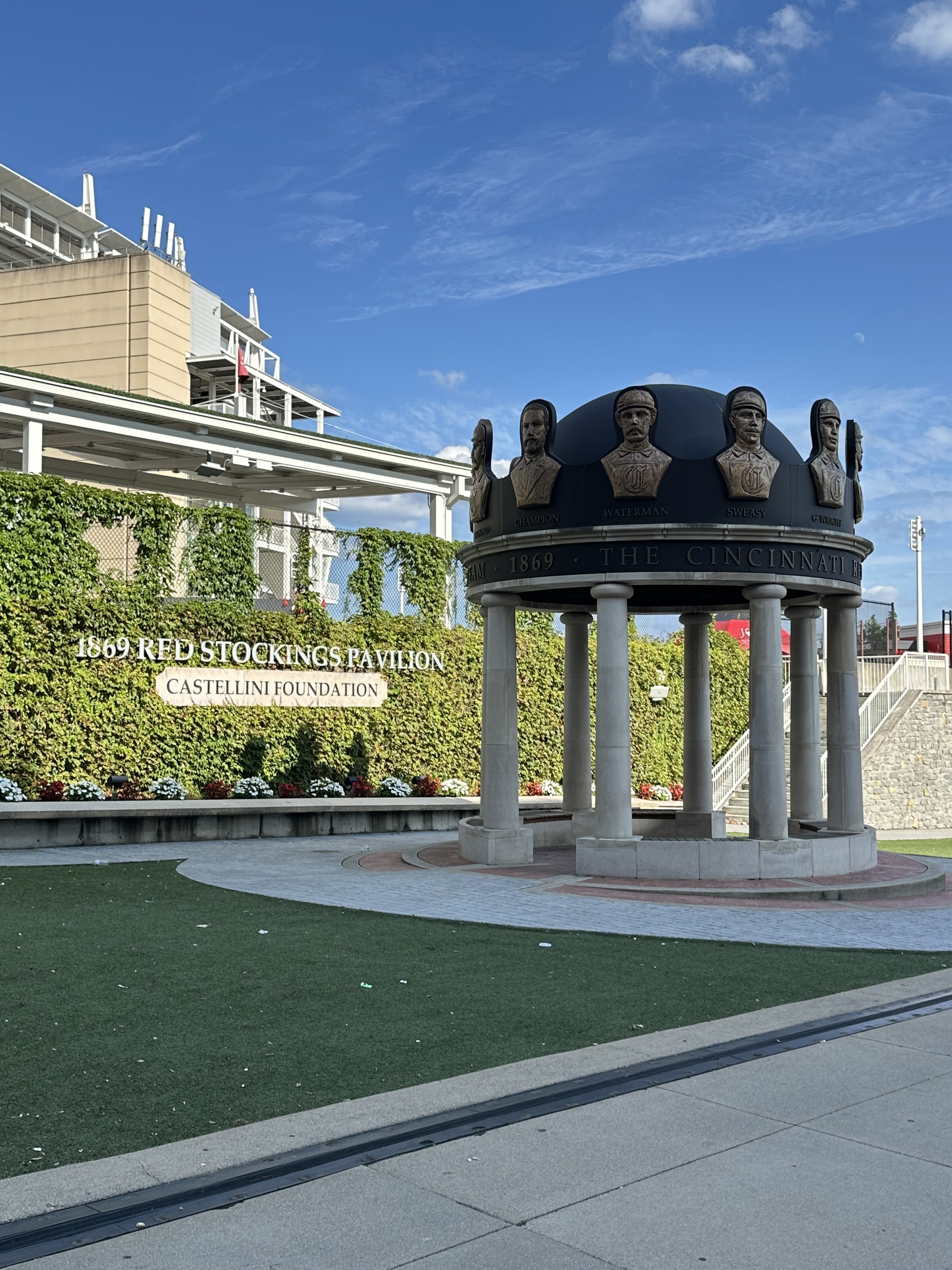
1869 Red Stockings Pavilion

A three-piece mural on the back of the scoreboard in left field depicts the bat Pete Rose used for his record-breaking 4,192nd hit and the ball he hit in 1985. This was replaced with new banners in 2015 as part of the All-Star Game upgrades.

=== Cincinnati Reds Hall of Fame and Museum ===
Located on the west side of Great American Ball Park on Main Street, the Hall of Fame and Museum celebrate the Reds' past through galleries and extensive use of multimedia. The Hall of Fame has been in existence since 1958, but did not previously have a building.

=== Rose Garden ===
Adjacent to both the stadium and the Reds Hall of Fame is a rose garden that symbolizes Pete Rose's record-breaking 4,192nd hit. It was strategically placed here because the ball landed around this area in Riverfront Stadium. The garden is visible from a stairwell in the hall of fame displaying the number of balls that Rose hit. This was replaced with a different marker as part of the construction of the 1869 Pavilion in 2019.

=== Reds-themed clock ===
A 4-way Reds-themed clock sits outside the main entrance. The clock is red with a white trim, while the top finial is hand‑painted to resemble a baseball, and each clock face includes "Cincinnati" across the top and "Reds" along the bottom. The clock faces also feature Roman numerals and the iconic Reds wishbone "C" centered on each dial. The clock also features speakers that can play chimes hourly and a wide range of music, including Take Me Out to the Ballgame. Joey Votto donated the clock to the Reds and the City of Cincinnati in March 2026, just days before Opening Day.

== Fan amenities ==
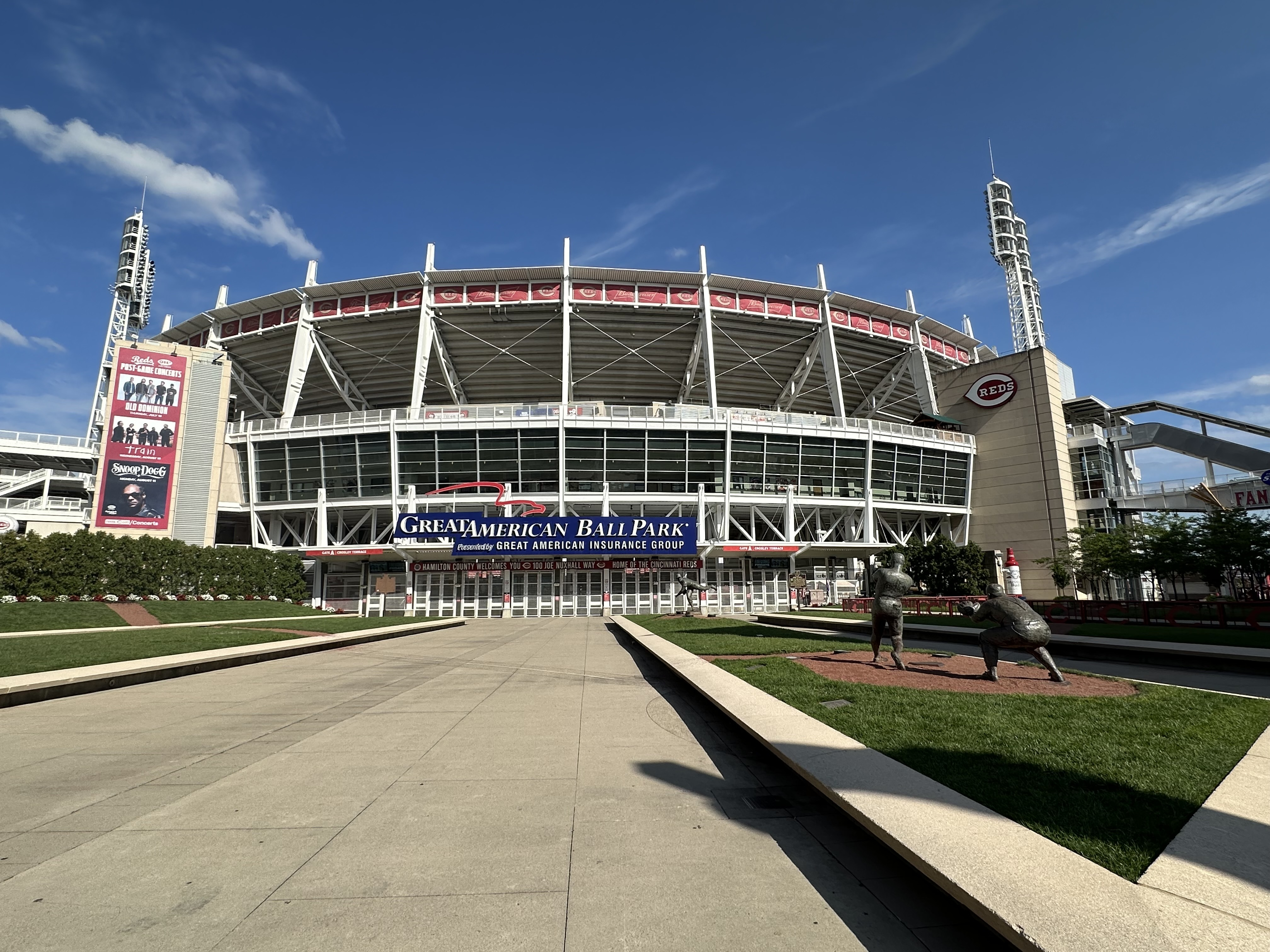
Entrance to Great American Ball Park in August 2025

=== Nursing suites ===
For the 2015 season, Great American Ball Park became the first MLB ballpark to feature a suite designed exclusively as a place for mothers to feed and care for their babies. Reds COO Phil Castellini, a father of five, says he felt compelled to do his best to provide a worthwhile solution after stadium officials told him an increasing number of women were asking where they could nurse their children at the ballpark. The suite has five glider chairs, diaper-changing stations, a restroom, a kitchenette, refrigerator, lockers, and televisions showing the game. It's located on the Suite Level near the Champions Club elevators. A second nursing suite was added as part of the addition of the TriHealth Family Zone on the former site of Redlegs Landing.

=== Sportsbook ===
For the 2023 season, the Reds partnered with BetMGM Sportsbook to introduce on-site sports betting. The BetMGM Sportsbook at Great American Ball Park is located in the Machine Room, and features three betting windows and 15 self-service kiosks, in addition to a full-service bar and food options.

== Notable non-baseball events ==
=== Concerts ===
Date	Artist	Opening act(s)	Tour / Concert name	Attendance	Revenue	Notes
August 4, 2011	Paul McCartney	DJ Chris Holmes	On The Run Tour	41,256 / 41,256	$4,158,146	This was his first Cincinnati appearance in 18 years.
June 28, 2014	Beyoncé; Jay-Z	—N/a	On the Run Tour	37,863 / 37,863	$4,250,931	First black act to headline the venue.
July 19, 2014	Jason Aldean	Miranda Lambert; Florida Georgia Line; Tyler Farr	Burn It Down Tour	39,196 / 39,196	$2,632,614	
June 16, 2018	Luke Bryan	Sam Hunt; Jon Pardi; Morgan Wallen	What Makes You Country Tour	—	—	
August 4, 2018	Zac Brown Band	Leon Bridges	Down the Rabbit Hole Live	—	—	
September 10, 2021	Billy Joel	—N/a	Billy Joel In Concert	42,013 / 42,013	$5,148,301	
July 15, 2022	Def Leppard; Mötley Crüe	Poison; Joan Jett; Classless Act	The Stadium Tour	34,877 / 34,877	$4,729,190	The show was initially scheduled for July 2, 2020, but was postponed due to the COVID-19 pandemic.
July 26, 2023	P!nk	Grouplove; KidCutUp; Brandi Carlile	Summer Carnival	40,800 / 40,800	$6,912,375	First female soloist to headline the stadium.
July 25, 2024	Foo Fighters	Pretenders; L7	Everything or Nothing at All Tour	—	—	
August 22, 2024	Green Day; The Smashing Pumpkins	Rancid; The Linda Lindas	The Saviors Tour	—	—	
June 26, 2026	Noah Kahan	Gigi Perez Annabelle Dinda	The Great Divide Tour	42,709 / 42,709	—	Highest-attended concert.

=== Other events ===
- On October 31, 2004, President George W. Bush and First Lady Laura Bush held a campaign rally in Great American Ball Park.
- On April 27, 2008, a memorial service for Staff Sergeant Keith Matthew Maupin was held at Great American Ball Park.

== Milestones and notable moments ==
=== Opening day (March 31, 2003) ===
Statistic	Player(s)/Team
First game	vs. Pittsburgh Pirates
First hit	Ken Griffey Jr. (a double)
First home run	Reggie Sanders, Pirates
First Reds home run	Austin Kearns, later in the same game
First ceremonial first pitch	George H. W. Bush
First at-bat	Kenny Lofton (a ground out)

=== Other firsts ===
Statistic	Details	Date
First grand slam	Russell Branyan	July 21, 2003
First playoff game	Game 3 NLDS	October 10, 2010
Fastest pitch ever	Aroldis Chapman zipped a fastball past Pittsburgh's Andrew McCutchen that registered 106 mph on the Great American Ball Park scoreboard. However, MLB.com's Pitch/FX tracker clocked the throw at 105.	April 18, 2011
Clinching division	Home Run vs. Houston Astros by Jay Bruce	September 28, 2010
First inside-the-park home run by the Reds	vs. Toronto Blue Jays by Drew Stubbs	June 17, 2011
Longest home run	Outfielder Adam Dunn hits the longest home run in Great American Ball Park history against José Lima and the Dodgers. The distance was 535 feet. The ball landed in the Ohio River, considered part of Kentucky.	August 10, 2004
1,000 hits	Second baseman Brandon Phillips records his 1,000th hit with a home run against the Cleveland Indians	July 1, 2011
All-Star Game Hosted	American League @ National League	July 14, 2015
No-hitter	Reds pitcher Homer Bailey pitched the first no-hitter in the history of Great American Ball Park, beating the San Francisco Giants 3–0.	July 2, 2013
First no-hitter by a visiting pitcher	Jake Arrieta no-hit the Reds while pitching for the Chicago Cubs, who won 16–0. (This was the most lopsided no-hitter in Major League Baseball since August 4, 1884, when the Buffalo Bisons' Pud Galvin threw an 18–0 no-hitter against the Detroit Wolverines.)	April 21, 2016

== Attendance records ==
Bold indicates the winner of each game.

**Highest attendance at Great American Ball Park**
Rank	Attendance	Date	Game result	Notes
1	44,599	October 10, 2010	Reds 0, **Phillies 3**	2010 NLDS, Game 3
2	44,501	October 9, 2012	Reds 1, **Giants 2** (10)	2012 NLDS, Game 3
3	44,375	October 10, 2012	Reds 3, **Giants 8**	2012 NLDS, Game 4
4	44,142	October 11, 2012	Reds 4, **Giants 6**	2012 NLDS, Game 5
5	44,073	June 2, 2023	Reds 4, **Brewers 5** (11)	2023 Regular Season, Zac Brown Band Post-Game Benefit Concert 4ALS (Regular season record)
6	44,063	March 30, 2023	Reds 4, **Pirates 5**	2023 Opening Day
7	44,049	March 28, 2019	**Reds 5**, Pirates 3	2019 Opening Day
8	44,030	March 28, 2024	**Reds 8**, Nationals 2	2024 Opening Day
9	43,897	March 26, 2026	Reds 0, **Red Sox 3**	2026 Opening Day
10	43,878	March 30, 2018	Reds 0, **Nationals 2**	2018 Opening Day
11	43,876	March 27, 2025	Reds 4, **Giants 6**	2025 Opening Day
12	43,804	April 3, 2017	Reds 3, **Phillies 4**	2017 Opening Day
13	43,683	April 4, 2016	**Reds 6**, Phillies 2	2016 Opening Day

== See also ==
- List of ballparks by capacity
- List of current Major League Baseball stadiums
- Lists of stadiums

Events and tenants
Preceded by Riverfront Stadium	Home of the Cincinnati Reds; 2003 – present	Succeeded by Current
Preceded by AutoZone Park	Host of the Civil Rights Game; 2009 – 2010	Succeeded by Turner Field
Preceded by Target Field	Host of the All-Star Game; 2015	Succeeded by Petco Park
