= Heywood Banks =

American comedian

- Born: Stuart Mitchell; April 1, 1950 (age 76)
- Occupations: Comedian; songwriter
- Website: www.heywoodbanks.com

Stuart Mitchell (born April 1, 1950), known professionally as Heywood Banks, is an American comedian, and writer and performer of humorous songs.

== Career ==
In the 1970s and 1980s, Mitchell used to perform under his own name, doing comedy and playing guitar. His wife suggested he develop a few characters after they visited Los Angeles in 1987 and found many other comedians doing similar things as him. He ended up developing the character Heywood Banks and started performing as him in 1987.

In 1988, he won the Johnnie Walker Comedy Search national finals, which gave him a television appearance on A&E's An Evening at the Improv, aired on October 19, 1988. Later the same year, he won the Miller Lite Comedy Search regional finals held in Clinton Township, Michigan.

His songs include "Toast", "Fly's Eyes", "Wiper Blades", "Pancreas", "Big Butter Jesus" (a song about the King of Kings statue), "18 Wheels (on a Big Rig)", "The One Eye Love" & "The Cat Got Dead".

The story of his song "Toast" goes back to around 1986, when he was browsing at a Salvation Army store for props for his act. He bought an old toaster, thinking maybe he would make toast during his act. Later, his wife said she was looking forward to having toast the next morning, and he started improvising a song about toast while playing a bongo.

Heywood frequently appears on the nationally syndicated radio program The Bob and Tom Show. His most popular and widely known song is called "Toast", played on a toaster with a pair of forks. Another recurring song that B&T occasionally play is "Trauma to the Groin". Heywood's songs have also been played on the Dr. Demento Show.

In 1993, he starred in a pilot called The Heywood Banks Show, which was aired on WJBK. He played the manager of a trailer park's convenience store called the Toast Basket. He also played a resident at the trailer park named Hyphen (Dash) Ampersand. He performed his song "Toast" on the pilot. Comedy writer B. K. Taylor also appeared on the show.

Banks' "The Revenge Song" (also known as "You Can Be Mean to Me") was performed on American Idol on January 16, 2007, by an "urban Amish" singer called Troy.

== Personal life ==
Banks is originally from Birmingham, Michigan. He attended Western Michigan University. He lives near Howell, Michigan.

== Albums ==
- If Pigs Had Wings & Other Favorite Songs (1990)
- Treated and Released (1992)
- Picky Picky Picky (1998)
- difErnt (1999)
- Pretending I'm Not Home (2003)
- Big Butter (2006)
- Heywood Banks Live! Never Trust a Puppet (2012)

== Television appearances ==
- A & E's Evening at The Improv with Richard Moll
- A & E's Evening at The Improv with John Davidson
- 6 MTV Big @!#% Shows
- MTV ½ Hour Comedy Hour
- CNN Hollywood Minute
- Caroline's Comedy Hour
- Entertainment Tonight
- Showtime Comedy Club Network
- 12th Annual HBO Young Comedians Special with Paul Rodriguez
- Harmony House television commercials
