= King of Kings (statue) =

Former statue in Ohio, US

- King of Kings in May 2008
- Artists: Brad Coriell, James Lynch
- Completion date: 2004
- Medium: Styrofoam, fiberglass
- Subject: Jesus
- Dimensions: 13 m (42 ft)
- Condition: Destroyed by lightning in 2010
- Location: Lebanon, Ohio; 39.453839°N 84.326533°W

King of Kings (also referred to as Touchdown Jesus) was a 62-foot (19 m) tall statue of Jesus on the east side of Interstate 75 at the Solid Rock Church, a 4000+ member Christian megachurch near Monroe, Ohio, in the United States.

It garnered widespread recognition and various nicknames during its existence from 2003 or 2004 until its destruction by lightning and subsequent fire on June 14, 2010.

A replacement statue, called Lux Mundi, was assembled and dedicated on the site in September 2012.

== Construction ==
It was designed by Brad Coriell, a Nashville artist and Dayton native. The statue was built by sculptor James Lynch of Florida, and assembled by Mark Mitten.

Its steel frame was constructed in nearby Lebanon, while the body, made of Styrofoam and fiberglass, was created in Jacksonville, Florida in Lynch's studio then trucked north. The main body of the statue was made from a core of Styrofoam covered by a thin skin of fiberglass. During installation, initially the head and arms were found to be too small for the chest, requiring Lynch to spend three months recasting these components.

=== Characteristics ===
It reportedly stood 20 feet taller than originally planned. The statue depicted Jesus from the torso up, appearing to burst from the ground, or a man-made reflecting pool, behind the church's amphitheater worship space. His arms were raised into the air.

Despite its large size, its skin, made of plastic foam and fiberglass over a steel frame, was noted as being thin enough to bend to the touch of a finger. The entire figure weighed 16,000 pounds, or 8 tons. At night, the statue was illuminated by spotlights from below.

The sculpted statue was completed in September 2004 at a cost of approximately $250,000, although another source claims it cost $500,000. Coriell donated some of his time to the project.

== Popularity and nicknames ==
The statue was given many nicknames, both affectionate and derisive, by local residents and I-75 travelers. Among them were:

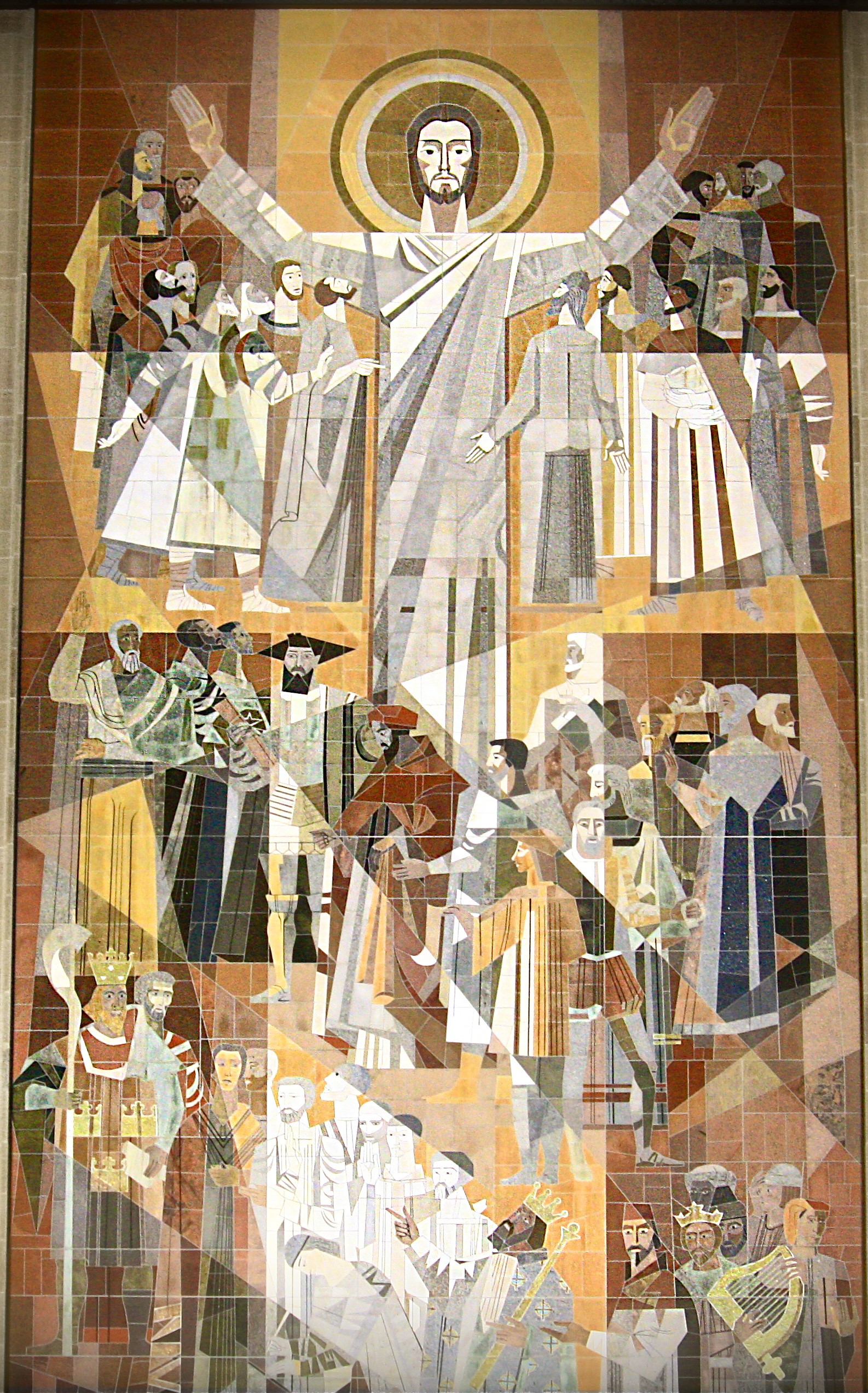
The Word of Life mural on Notre Dame's Hesburgh Library, nicknamed "Touchdown Jesus" since its creation in 1964, shows Jesus painted in a similar pose.

- Big J
- Big Butter Jesus
- Touchdown Jesus (based on a similarity to the 1964 Word of Life mural on the Hesburgh Library overlooking Notre Dame Stadium — American football referees signal a touchdown with a similar gesture)
- Super Jesus
- MC 62-Foot Jesus (like musician MC 900 Ft. Jesus)

The statue was also credited with inspiring two musical works:

- Comedian Heywood Banks wrote and performed his novelty song "Big Butter Jesus" about the statue.
- Singer-songwriter Robbie Schaefer of the band Eddie from Ohio wrote the song "Monroe, OH" after driving past the statue.

The statue was also a popular photographic subject for fans of The Ohio State University, who would align Jesus' upraised arms as the "H" when spelling out "O-H-I-O".

=== Reception ===
The statue elicited strong and varied opinions. Many viewed it as a positive landmark and a significant religious symbol.

David Lovell, administrator for Solid Rock Church, stated that the statue "helped the body of Christ in general because the name of Jesus Christ was discussed," and that it encouraged people to consider "what Jesus did for us" and that the statue was "just steel and Styrofoam." He also noted that the image of Christ "spurred something in them," bringing people into the church. Church co-pastor Darlene Bishop stated its purpose was to clarify that Solid Rock was a church centered on Jesus, as many visitors were unsure of its nature. She also claimed that half of the church's visitors came because they had seen the statue, and that it brought "more advertisement that we could have ever paid for."

The statue also faced criticism. A common complaint was that it constituted a form of idolatry, a sentiment David Lovell acknowledged but countered by asserting, "No one worships that statue." Others found it "a little silly" or "overdone", perceiving it as a joke or punchline. Some hoped it would not be rebuilt after its destruction.

== Destruction ==
On June 14, 2010, at approximately 11:15 p.m., the statue was struck by lightning and consumed in the resulting blaze. With flames reportedly reaching up to 100 feet. Due to its construction materials of plastic foam and fiberglass over a steel frame, the statue quickly burned down to its blackened steel skeleton, with pieces of foam scattering into a nearby pond.

The fire also spread to the attic of the adjacent Lawrence Bishop Music Theatre, part of the church's amphitheater, but was contained there, and no one was injured. Damage estimates totaled $700,000, with $300,000 attributed to the statue itself and $400,000 to the amphitheater. Church officials noted that existing lightning resisters and grounding rods on the statue and surrounding area failed to prevent the fire.

Following the fire, the pastor of the church stated that the church planned to rebuild the statue with fireproof material. In the days after the destruction, the church's digital sign displayed the message "He'll be back".

Although the statue cost about $250,000 to construct, it was insured for $500,000 because Coriell had donated his time to the creation.

PETA offered funding through an "anonymous Christian donor" to help rebuild the statue if allowed to promote veganism via pamphlets at the church.

== Replacement statue ==
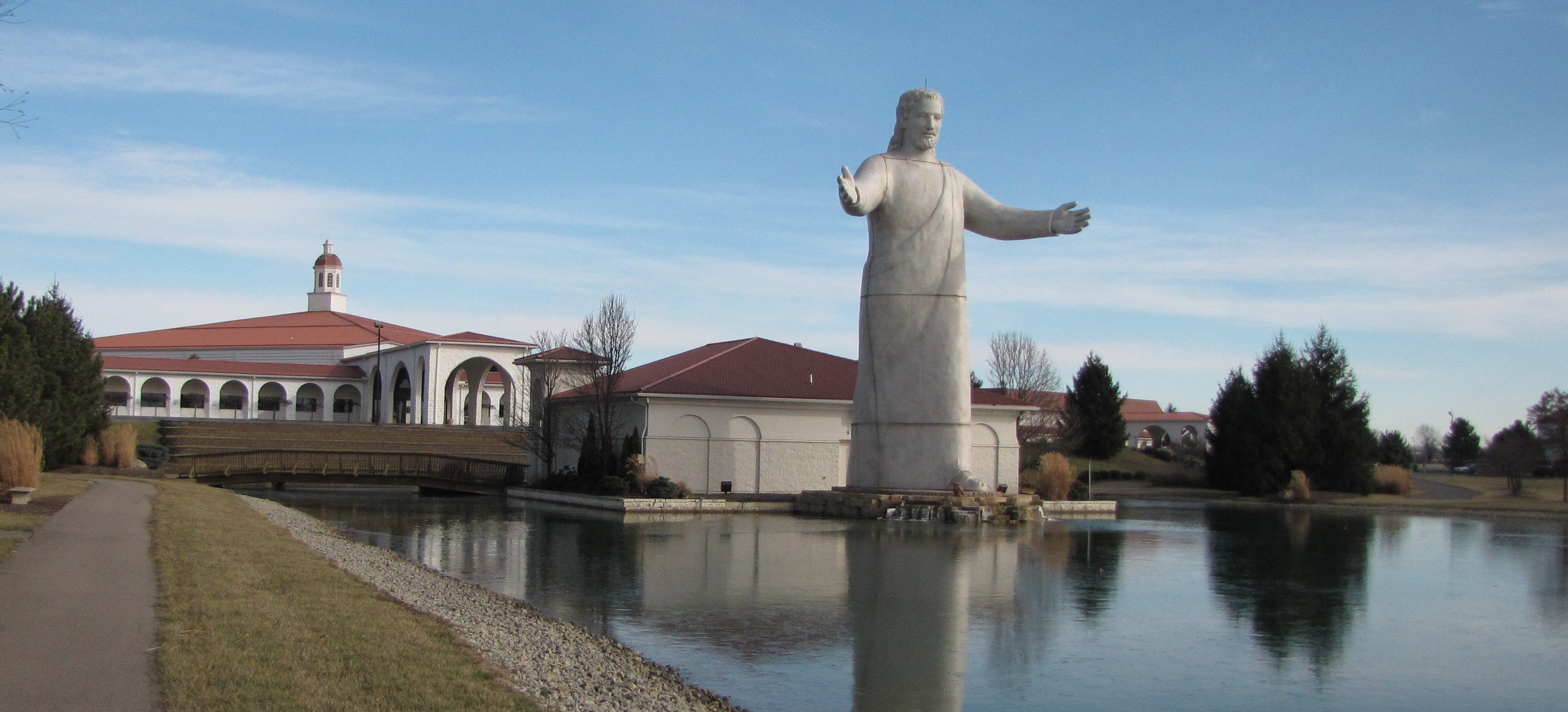
Lux Mundi at Solid Rock Church

Construction of a 52-foot (16 m) replacement statue with a substantially different design began in June 2012. The new statue, called Lux Mundi, was assembled on the site on September 19, 2012, and dedicated on September 30, 2012.

== See also ==
- List of statues of Jesus
- List of tallest statues
- List of the tallest statues in the United States
