= Monroe, Ohio =

City in Ohio, US

- City
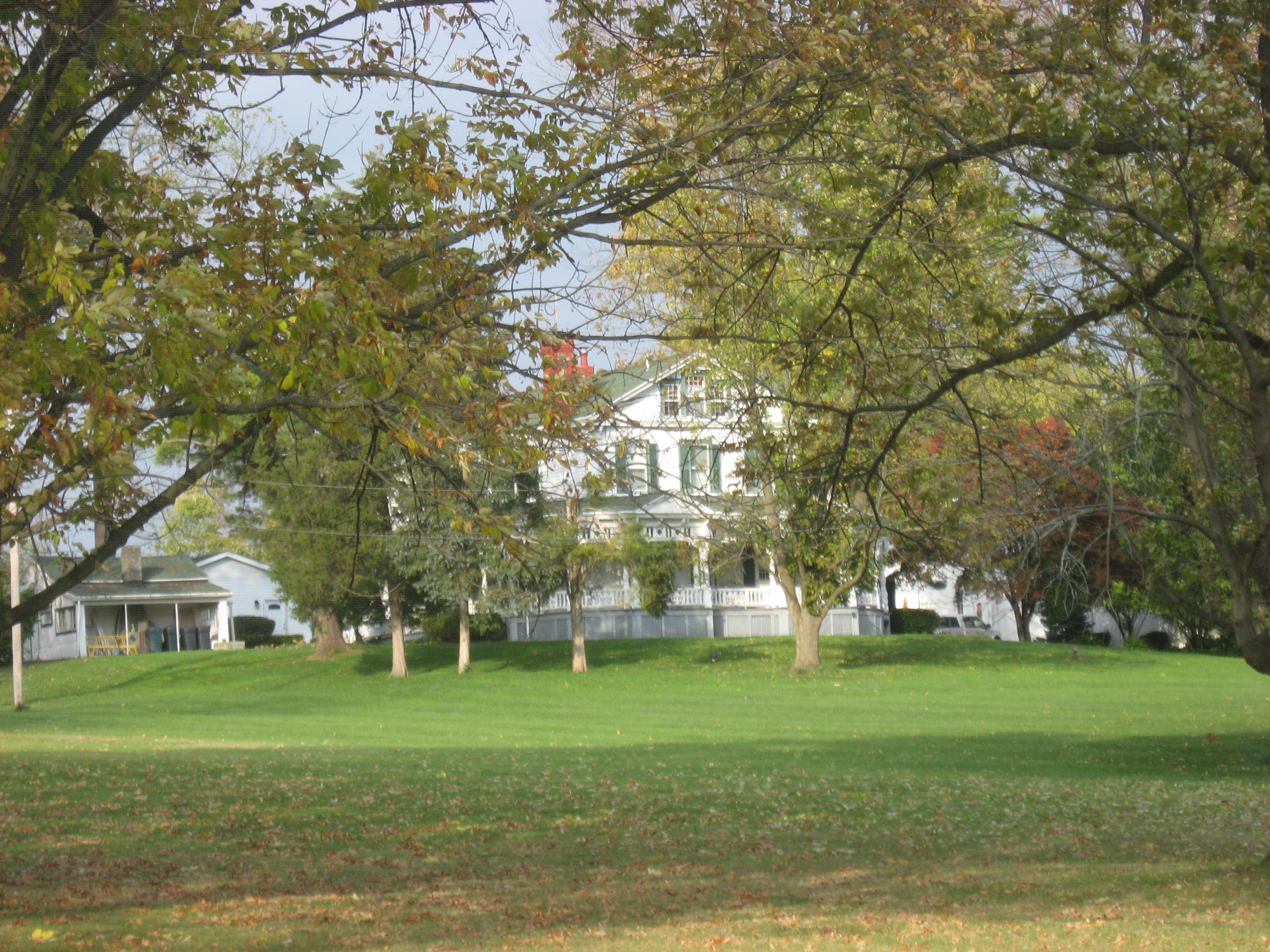
- Hughes Manor

- Flag Seal Logo
- Motto: "Firmly Founded - Proudly Growing"
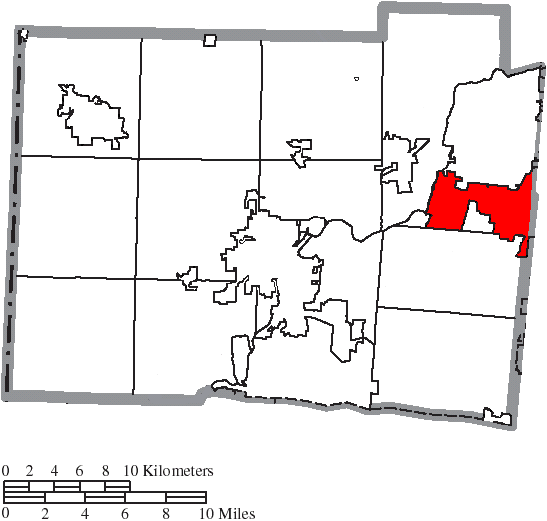
- Location of Monroe in Butler County

- Location within Ohio Location within the United States
- Coordinates: 39°26′46″N 84°22′00″W
- Country: United States
- State: Ohio
- Counties: Butler, Warren
- Townships: Lemon, Liberty, Turtlecreek

Government
  - Mayor: Keith Funk

Area
  - Total: 15.92 sq mi (41.22 km^{2})
  - Land: 15.89 sq mi (41.16 km^{2})
  - Water: 0.023 sq mi (0.06 km^{2})
- Elevation: 820 ft (250 m)

Population (2020)
  - Total: 15,412
  - Density: 969.9/sq mi (374.48/km^{2})
- Time zone: UTC-5 (Eastern (EST))
  - Summer (DST): UTC-4 (EDT)
- ZIP codes: 45050, 45044 (pt), 45073, 45099
- Area code: 513
- FIPS code: 39-51310
- GNIS feature ID: 2395374
- Website: City website

Monroe is a city in east central Butler and west central Warren counties in the southwestern part of the U.S. state of Ohio. The population was 15,412 at the 2020 census. Monroe is a part of the Cincinnati metropolitan area.

== History ==
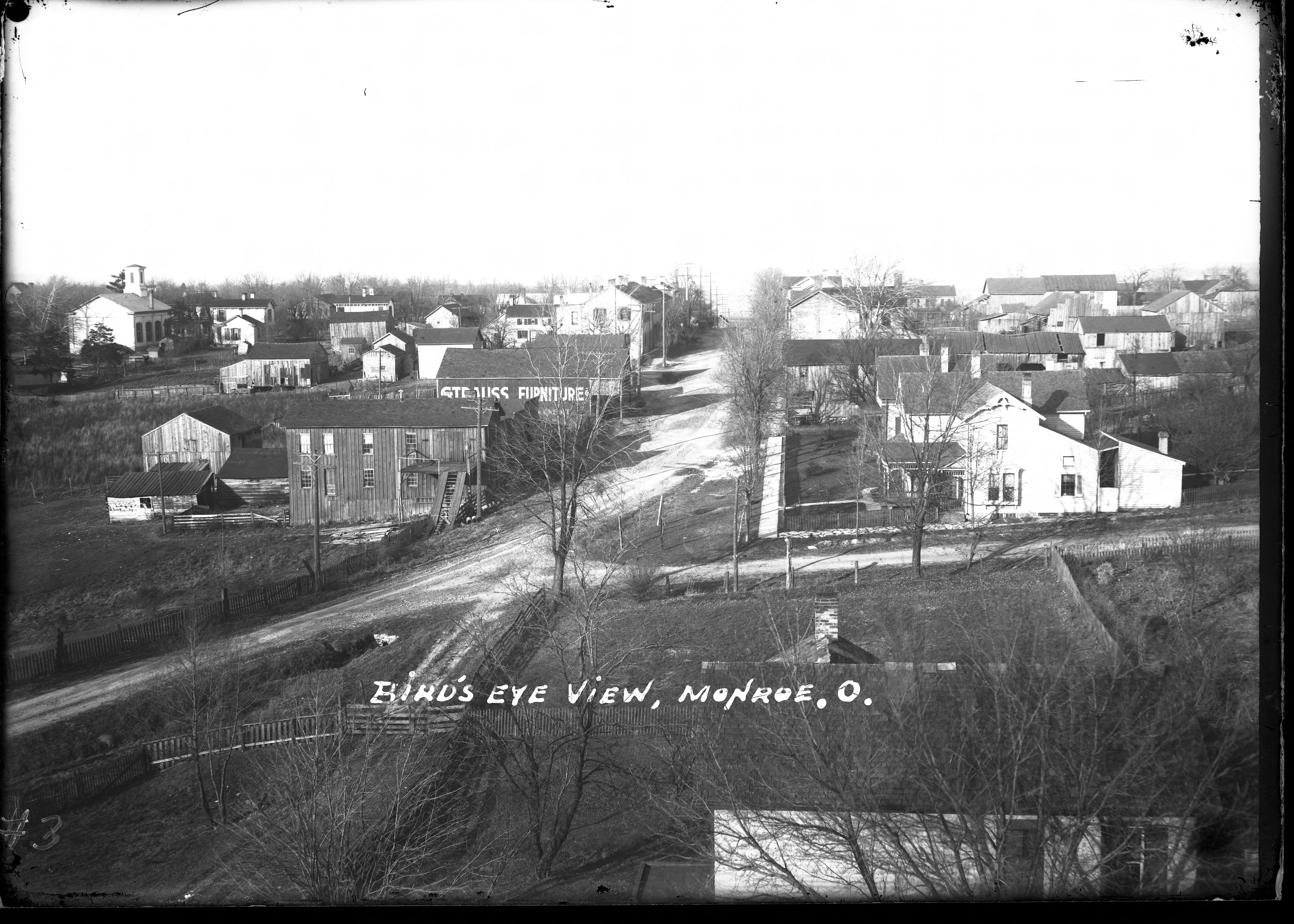
View of the Great Miami Pike, present-day Cincinnati Dayton Road. Coming from the right is South Street, present-day Lebanon Street. The two houses on that corner still stand. Across the street today are the post office and the City Building.

Monroe was laid out in 1817 on the Dayton and Cincinnati pike. The city is named for President James Monroe, fifth President of the United States.

In the early 1830s, Monroe contained one store and 119 inhabitants.

== Geography ==
According to the United States Census Bureau, the city has a total area of 15.89 square miles (41.15 km^{2}), of which 15.87 square miles (41.10 km^{2}) is land and 0.02 square miles (0.05 km^{2}) is water.

== Demographics ==
Historical population
Census	Pop.	Note	%±
1850	198		—
1870	324		—
1880	365		12.7%
1910	255		—
1920	266		4.3%
1930	285		7.1%
1940	307		7.7%
1950	360		17.3%
1960	2,193		509.2%
1970	3,492		59.2%
1980	4,256		21.9%
1990	4,490		5.5%
2000	7,133		58.9%
2010	12,442		74.4%
2020	15,412		23.9%
2025 (est.)	15,880		3.0%

=== 2020 census ===
As of the 2020 census, Monroe had a population of 15,412. The median age was 37.6 years. 27.3% of residents were under the age of 18 and 15.8% of residents were 65 years of age or older. For every 100 females there were 95.6 males, and for every 100 females age 18 and over there were 91.4 males age 18 and over.

99.9% of residents lived in urban areas, while 0.1% lived in rural areas.

There were 5,484 households in Monroe, of which 40.0% had children under the age of 18 living in them. Of all households, 59.2% were married-couple households, 13.6% were households with a male householder and no spouse or partner present, and 21.2% were households with a female householder and no spouse or partner present. About 20.8% of all households were made up of individuals and 10.2% had someone living alone who was 65 years of age or older.

There were 5,641 housing units, of which 2.8% were vacant. The homeowner vacancy rate was 0.9% and the rental vacancy rate was 3.9%.

Racial composition as of the 2020 census
Race	Number	Percent
White	12,908	83.8%
Black or African American	792	5.1%
American Indian and Alaska Native	38	0.2%
Asian	498	3.2%
Native Hawaiian and Other Pacific Islander	9	0.1%
Some other race	238	1.5%
Two or more races	929	6.0%
Hispanic or Latino (of any race)	526	3.4%

=== 2010 census ===
As of the census of 2010, there were 12,442 people, 4,649 households, and 3,481 families living in the city. The population density was 784.0 inhabitants per square mile (302.7/km^{2}). There were 4,896 housing units at an average density of 308.5 per square mile (119.1/km^{2}). The racial makeup of the city was 92.6% White, 3.7% African American, 0.2% Native American, 1.7% Asian, 0.7% from other races, and 1.3% from two or more races. Hispanic or Latino of any race were 1.8% of the population.

There were 4,649 households, of which 39.2% had children under the age of 18 living with them, 61.6% were married couples living together, 8.8% had a female householder with no husband present, 4.5% had a male householder with no wife present, and 25.1% were non-families. 21.3% of all households were made up of individuals, and 10.1% had someone living alone who was 65 years of age or older. The average household size was 2.63 and the average family size was 3.07.

The median age in the city was 36.9 years. 27% of residents were under the age of 18; 5.9% were between the ages of 18 and 24; 29.7% were from 25 to 44; 23.1% were from 45 to 64; and 14.3% were 65 years of age or older. The gender makeup of the city was 48.8% male and 51.2% female.

=== 2000 census ===
As of the census of 2000, there were 7,133 people, 2,685 households, and 2,040 families living in the city. The population density was 459.9 inhabitants per square mile (177.6/km^{2}). There were 2,822 housing units at an average density of 182.0 per square mile (70.3/km^{2}). The racial makeup of the city was 97.15% White, 1.42% African American, 0.10% Native American, 0.34% Asian, 0.22% from other races, and 0.77% from two or more races. Hispanic or Latino of any race were 0.64% of the population.

There were 2,685 households, out of which 32.4% had children under the age of 18 living with them, 65.1% were married couples living together, 6.9% had a female householder with no husband present, and 24.0% were non-families. 20.3% of all households were made up of individuals, and 9.3% had someone living alone who was 65 years of age or older. The average household size was 2.52 and the average family size was 2.91.

In the city the population was spread out, with 22.8% under the age of 18, 6.5% from 18 to 24, 29.1% from 25 to 44, 22.6% from 45 to 64, and 19.0% who were 65 years of age or older. The median age was 40 years. For every 100 females, there were 91.7 males. For every 100 females age 18 and over, there were 88.3 males.

The median income for a household in the city was $56,012, and the median income for a family was $62,528. Males had a median income of $44,864 versus $27,385 for females. The per capita income for the city was $24,735. About 1.0% of families and 1.9% of the population were below the poverty line, including 0.4% of those under age 18 and 2.1% of those age 65 or over.

== Schools and utilities ==
Most of the city is in the Monroe Local School District with some falling in the Lakota Local School District. Telephone service is provided through the Monroe, Middletown, and Mason exchanges. Mail is delivered through the Monroe, Middletown, and Lebanon post offices. There is both a police station and a fire station on Main St. as well as the fire headquarters on Rt. 4.

== Tourism ==
- Lux Mundi statue, located at the former site of the King of Kings statue (also known as "Touchdown Jesus" and "Big Butter Jesus") which was struck by lightning in 2010 and destroyed by fire.

== Notable people ==
- Makala Woods, professional soccer player.
