= Anta Gorda =

Municipality of Rio Grande do Sul, Brazil

- Municipality
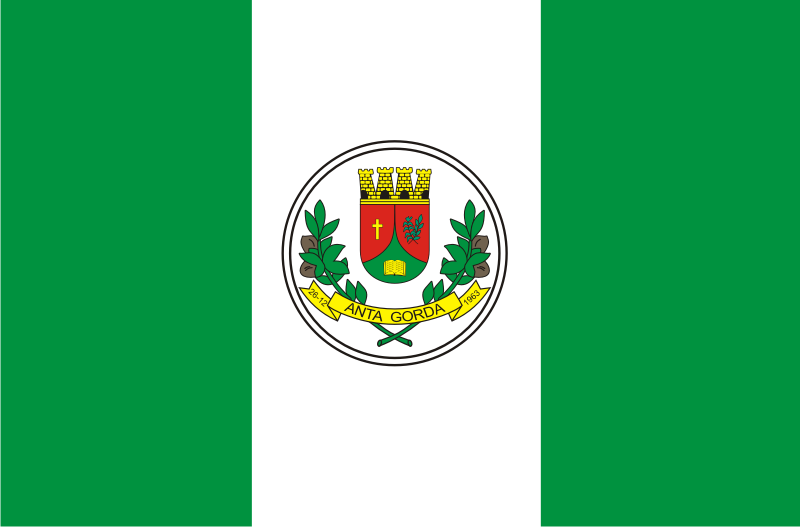
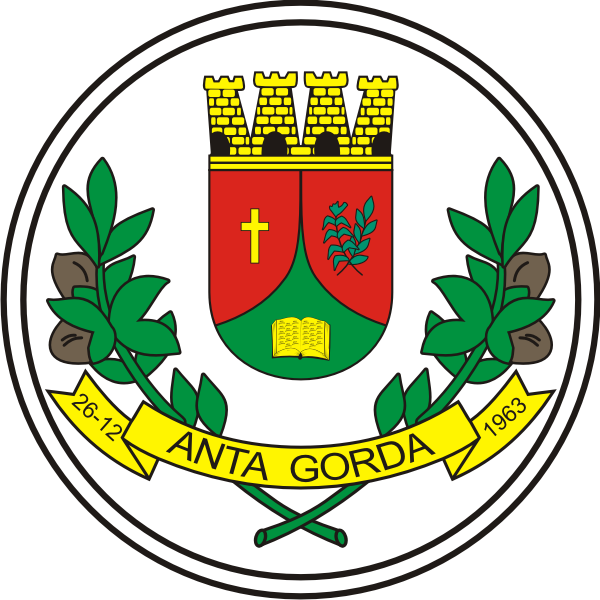
- Flag Coat of arms

- Location in Brazil
- Coordinates: 28°58′12″S 52°00′18″W
- Country: Brazil
- State: Rio Grande do Sul
- Mesoregion: Nordeste Rio-grandense
- Microregion: Guaporé
- Founded: December 26, 1963

Government
  - Mayor: Francisco David Frighetto (PSL)

Area
  - Total: 242.963 km^{2} (93.809 sq mi)
- Elevation: 411 m (1,348 ft)

Population (2020)
  - Total: 5,961
  - Density: 24.53/km^{2} (63.54/sq mi)
- Time zone: UTC−3 (BRT)
- HDI: 0.821
- GDP: R$54,267,000
- GDP per capita: R$8,748.00

Anta Gorda (Portuguese: [ˈɐ̃.tɐ ˈɡoʁ.dɐ], lit. 'fat tapir') is a municipality in the state of Rio Grande do Sul, Brazil. The surrounding municipalities are Guaporé, Doutor Ricardo, Encantado, Ilópolis, and Arvorezinha. It is about 210 km from Porto Alegre.

== Territorial occupation ==
The habitation of the area that is now Anta Gorda in Vale do Taquari began around 1900, when German and Polish settlers began arriving. Soon, however, there was a strong presence of Italians, like occurred in various locations throughout the Taquari Valley.

== Origin of name ==
The name of the town is attributed to the result of a memorable hunt. When Anta Gorda became part of Lajeado district in 1910, the name was changed to Carlos Barbosa (a tribute to the then governor Carlos Barbosa Gonçalves), but the population pressured for a return to the old name, which occurred two years later.

== Emancipation ==
When Encantado became a municipality in 1915, Anta Gorda was moved to its territory, as its second district. As a result of a political-administrative problems occurred in 1936, Anta Gorda was once the seat of county for two months.

Anta Gorda became a municipality on December 26, 1963, according to Law No. 4686. Five other municipalities were created that day: Ilópolis, Ronda Alta, Severiano de Almeida, Planalto and Putinga.

== Tourism ==
Anta Gorda forms part of the Caminho dos Moinhos (Path of Mills). In the city are the Moinho Dall, of 1919, and Vicenzi, in 1930 and located at edge of a waterfall.

== See also ==
- List of mayors of Anta Gorda
- List of municipalities in Rio Grande do Sul
