= Christ the Redeemer (statue) =

Colossal statue in Rio de Janeiro, Brazil

- Cristo Redentor
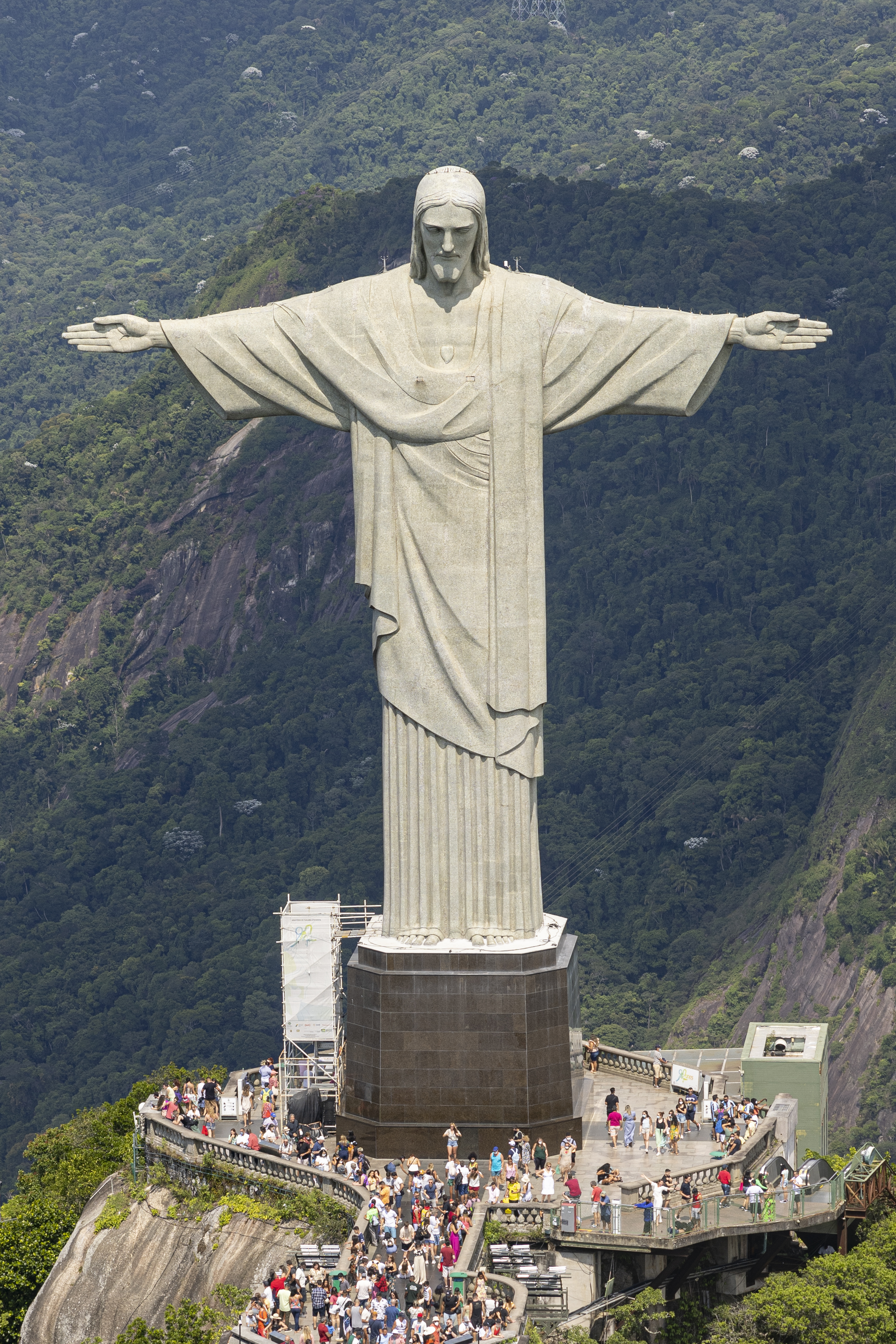
- The statue in 2022
- Interactive map of Christ the Redeemer
- Location: Corcovado, Rio de Janeiro, Brazil
- Coordinates: 22°57′7″S 43°12′38″W
- Designer: Designed by sculptors Paul Landowski and Heitor da Silva Costa and built by engineer Heitor da Silva Costa in collaboration with Albert Caquot. Sculptor Gheorghe Leonida created the face.
- Material: Reinforced concrete with soapstone veneer
- Width: 28 metres (92 ft)
- Height: 30 metres (98 ft), 38 metres (125 ft) with its pedestal
- Completion date: Dedicated October 12, 1931; 95 years ago
- Consecrated October 12, 2006; New Seven Wonders of the World July 7, 2007

National Historic Heritage of Brazil
- Designated: 2001
- Reference no.: 1478

Christ the Redeemer (Portuguese: Cristo Redentor, standard Brazilian Portuguese: [ˈkɾistu ʁedẽˈtoʁ]) is an Art Deco statue of Jesus in Rio de Janeiro, Brazil, created by French-Polish sculptor Paul Landowski and built by Brazilian engineer Heitor da Silva Costa, in collaboration with French engineer Albert Caquot and Romanian sculptor Gheorghe Leonida who sculpted the face. Constructed between 1922 and 1931, the statue is 30 metres (98 ft) high, excluding its 8-metre (26 ft) pedestal, and faces east. The arms stretch 28 metres (92 ft) wide. It is made of reinforced concrete and soapstone. Christ the Redeemer differs considerably from its original design, as the initial plan was a large Christ with a globe in one hand and a cross in the other. Although the project organizers originally accepted the design, it later changed to the statue of today, with the arms spread out wide.

The statue weighs 635 metric tons (625 long, 700 short tons), and is located at the peak of the 700-metre (2,300 ft) Corcovado mountain in the Tijuca National Park overlooking the city of Rio de Janeiro. This statue is the largest Art Deco–style sculpture in the world. A symbol of Christianity around the world, the statue has also become a cultural icon of both Rio de Janeiro and Brazil and was voted one of the New 7 Wonders of the World.

== History ==
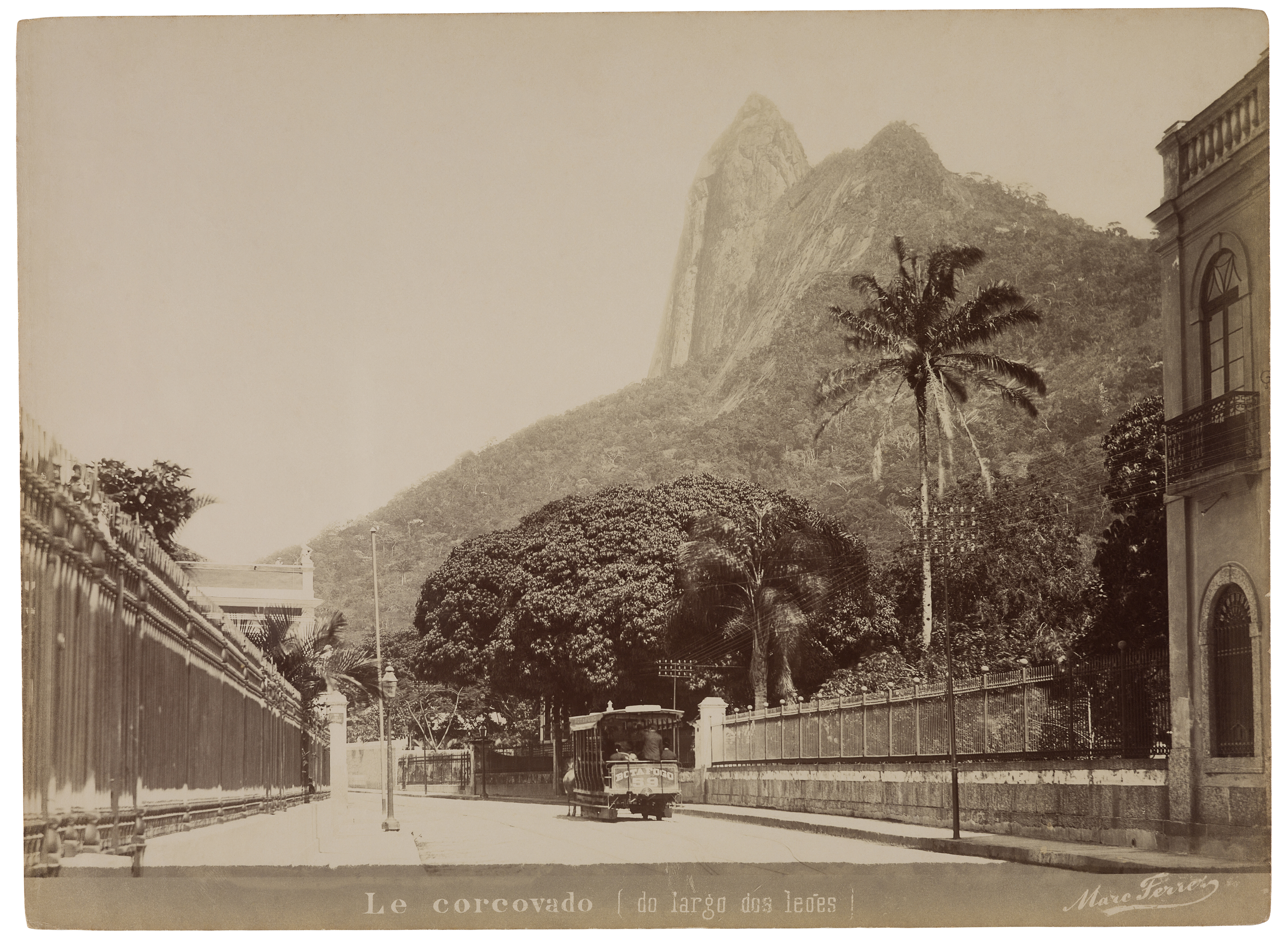
A view of Corcovado before the construction, between 1880 and 1900

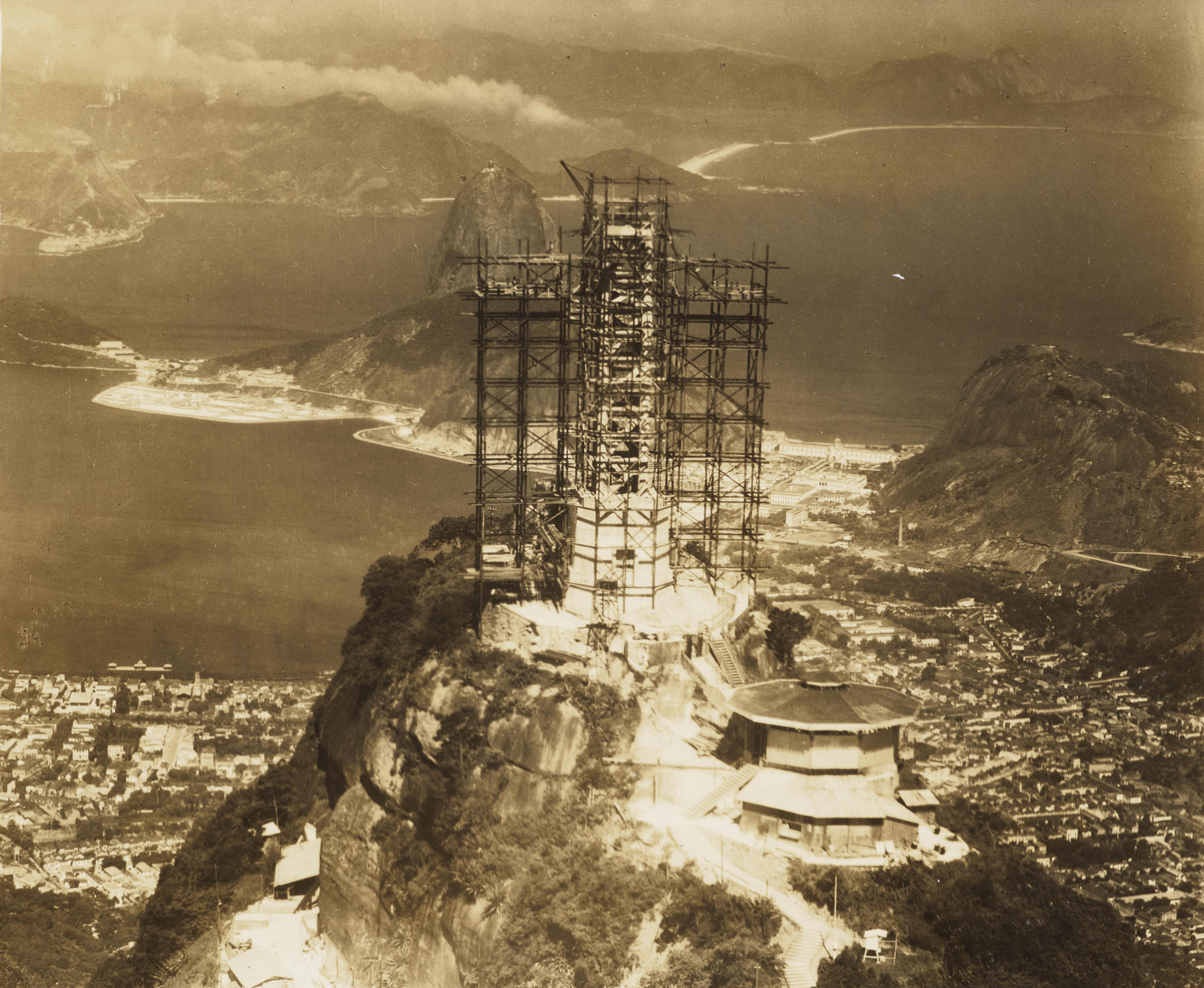
The peak of Corcovado with the statue under construction, c. 1930−1931

Vincentian priest Pedro Maria Boss first suggested placing a Christian monument on Mount Corcovado in the mid-1850s to honor Princess Isabel, regent of Brazil and the daughter of Emperor Pedro II, but the project was not approved. In 1889, the country became a republic, and owing to the separation of church and state, the proposed statue was dismissed.

The Catholic Circle of Rio made a second proposal for a landmark statue on the mountain in 1920. The group organized an event called Semana do Monumento ("Monument Week") to attract donations and collect signatures to support the building of the statue. The organization was motivated by what they perceived as "Godlessness" in the society. The donations came mostly from Brazilian Catholics. The designs considered for the "Statue of the Christ" included a representation of the Christian cross, a statue of Jesus with a globe in his hands, and a pedestal symbolizing the world. Eventually, the statue of Christ the Redeemer with open arms, a symbol of peace, was chosen.

Local engineer Heitor da Silva Costa and artist Carlos Oswald designed the statue. French sculptor Paul Landowski created the work.

In 1922, Landowski commissioned fellow Parisian Romanian sculptor Gheorghe Leonida, who studied sculpture at the Fine Arts Conservatory in Bucharest and in Italy.

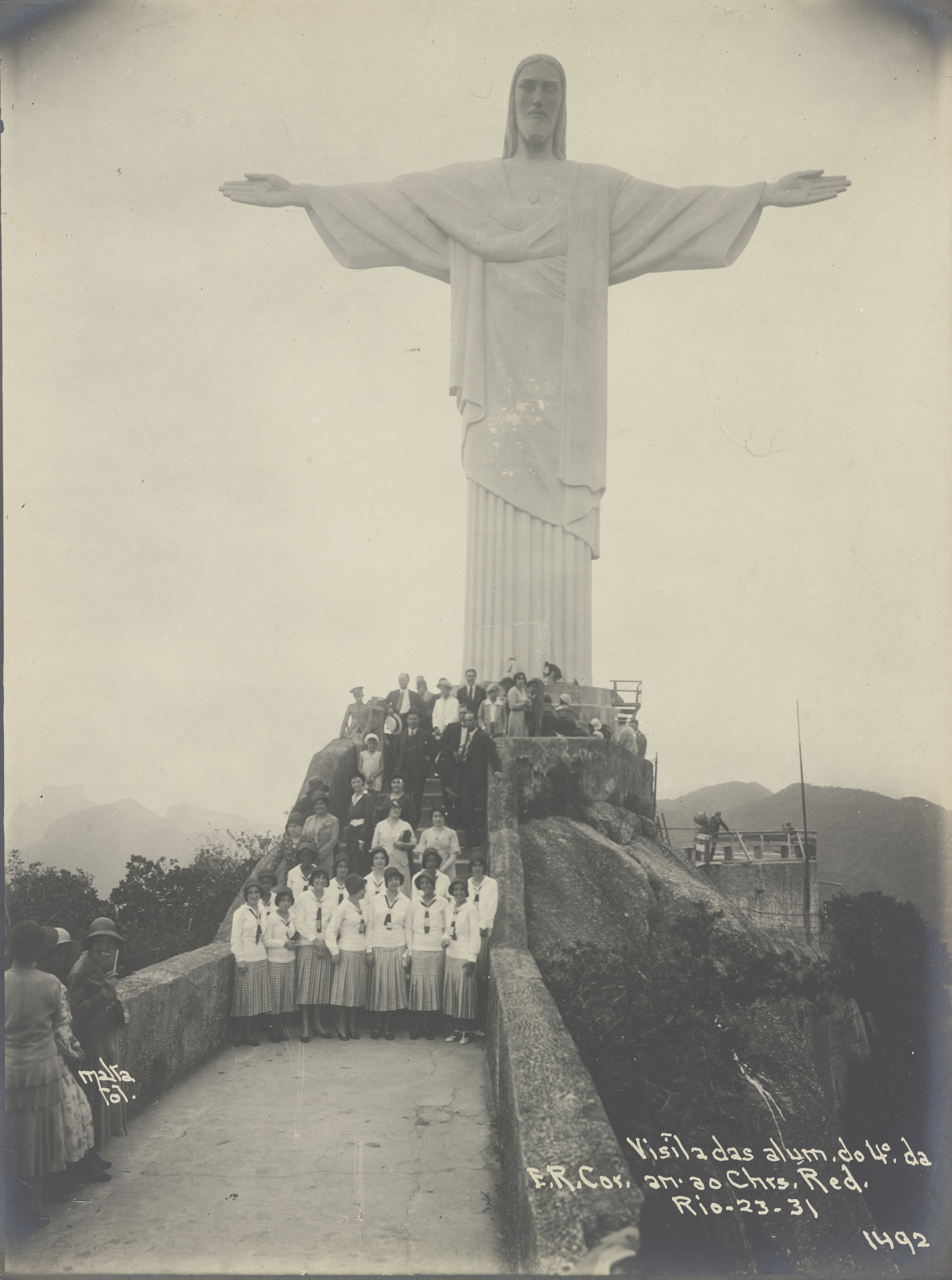
Christ the Redeemer in 1931

A group of engineers and technicians studied Landowski's submissions, and they felt building the structure out of reinforced concrete (designed by Albert Caquot) instead of steel was more suitable for the cross-shaped statue. The concrete making up the base was supplied from Limhamn, Sweden. The outer layers are soapstone, chosen for its enduring qualities and ease of use. Construction took nine years, from 1922 to 1931, and cost the equivalent of US$250,000 (equivalent to $4,500,000 in 2025) and the monument opened on October 12, 1931. During the opening ceremony, the statue was to be lit by a battery of floodlights turned on remotely by Italian shortwave radio inventor Guglielmo Marconi, stationed 9,200 kilometres (5,700 mi) away in Rome but because of bad weather, the lights were activated on site.

In October 2006, on the 75th anniversary of the statue's completion, Cardinal Eusebio Oscar Scheid, Archbishop of Rio, consecrated a chapel, named after Brazil's patron saint—Our Lady of the Apparition—under the statue, allowing Catholics to hold baptisms and weddings there.

Lightning struck the statue during a violent thunderstorm on February 10, 2008, causing some damage to the fingers, head and eyebrows. The Rio de Janeiro state government initiated a restoration effort to replace some of the outer soapstone layers and repair the lightning rods on the statue. Lightning damaged it again on January 17, 2014, dislodging a finger on the right hand.

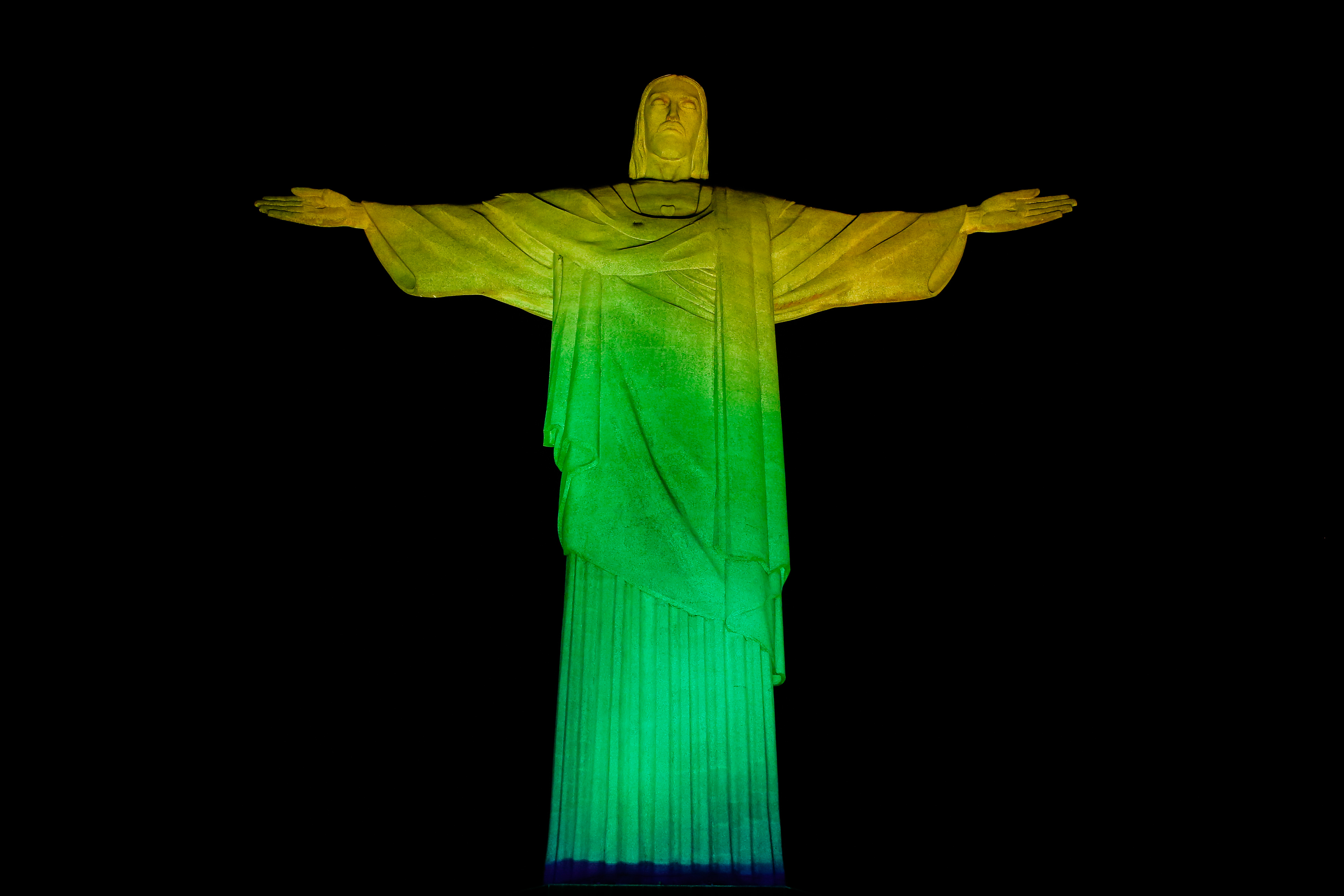
The statue lit in the colors of the Flag of Brazil

In 2010, a massive restoration of the statue began. Work included cleaning, replacing the mortar and soapstone on the exterior, restoring iron in the internal structure, and waterproofing the monument. Vandals attacked the statue during renovation, spraying paint along the arm. Mayor Eduardo Paes called the act "a crime against the nation". The culprits later apologized and presented themselves to the police.

In reference to Brazilian striker Ronaldo’s usual goal celebration of both arms outstretched, the Pirelli tyre company ran a 1998 commercial in which he replaced the statue while in an Inter Milan strip. The commercial was controversial with the Catholic Church.

== Restoration ==
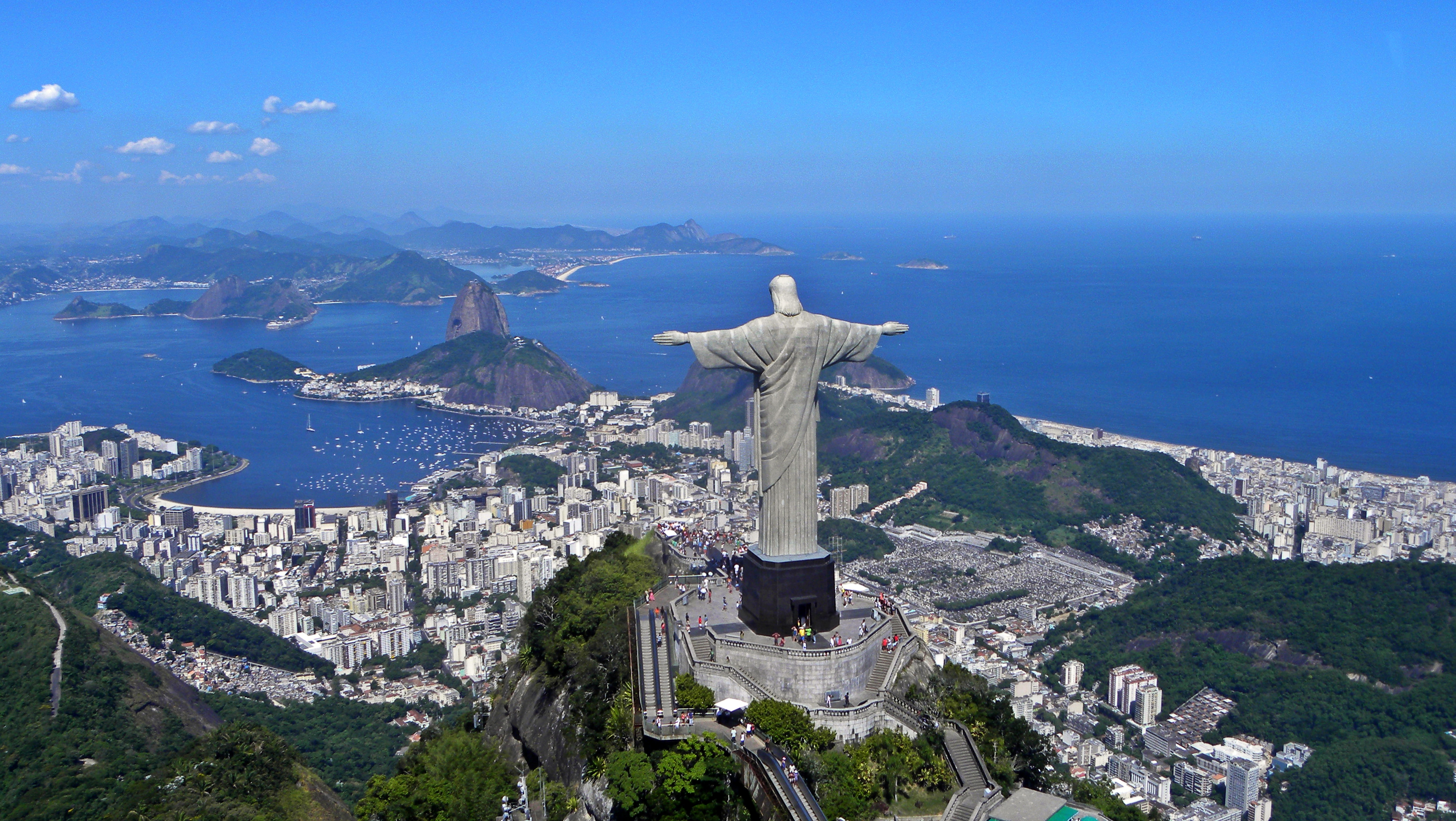
A panoramic view of the statue at the top of Corcovado Mountain with Sugarloaf Mountain (centre) and Guanabara Bay in the background

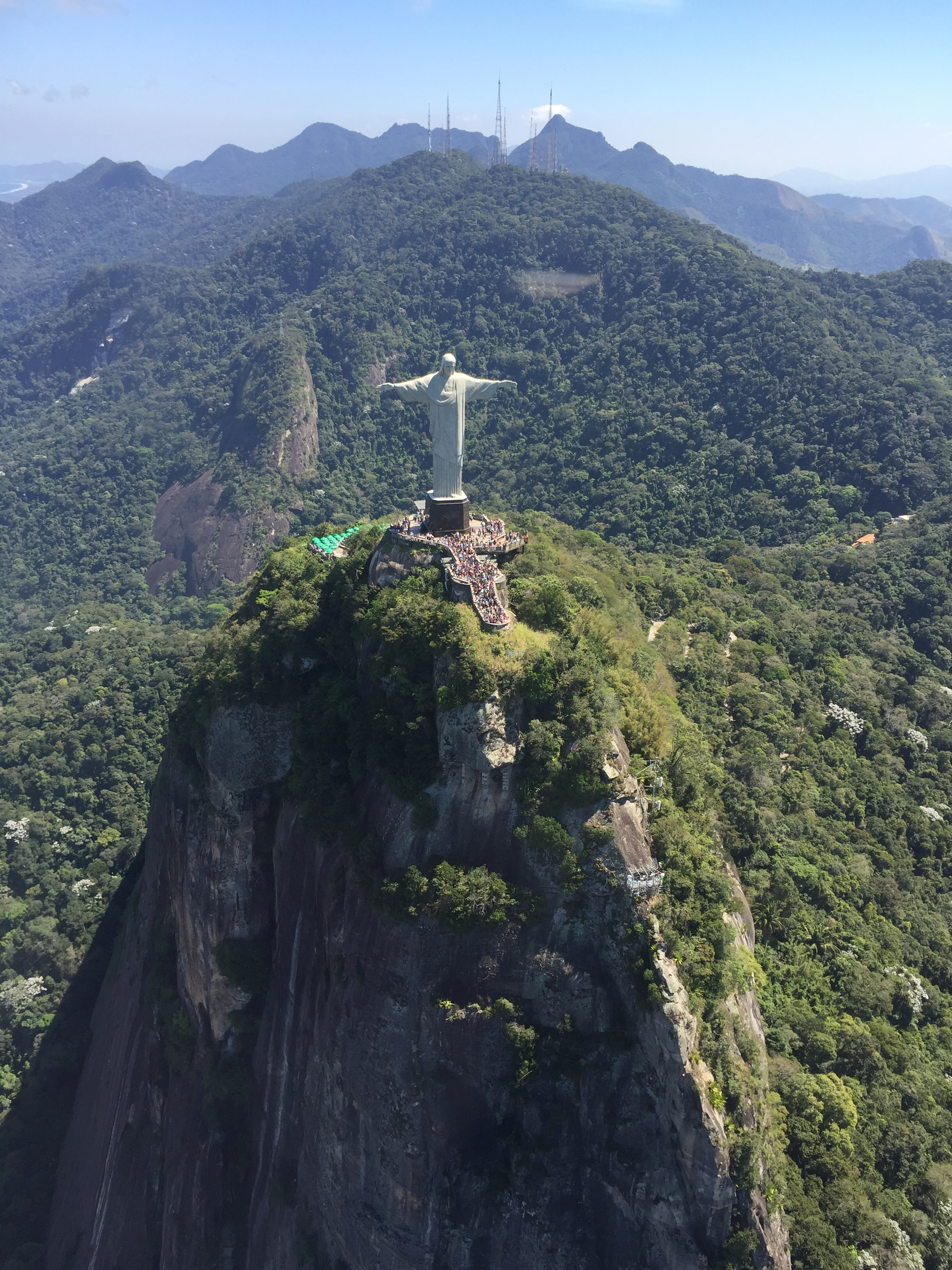
Christ the Redeemer aerial view with Tijuca Forest

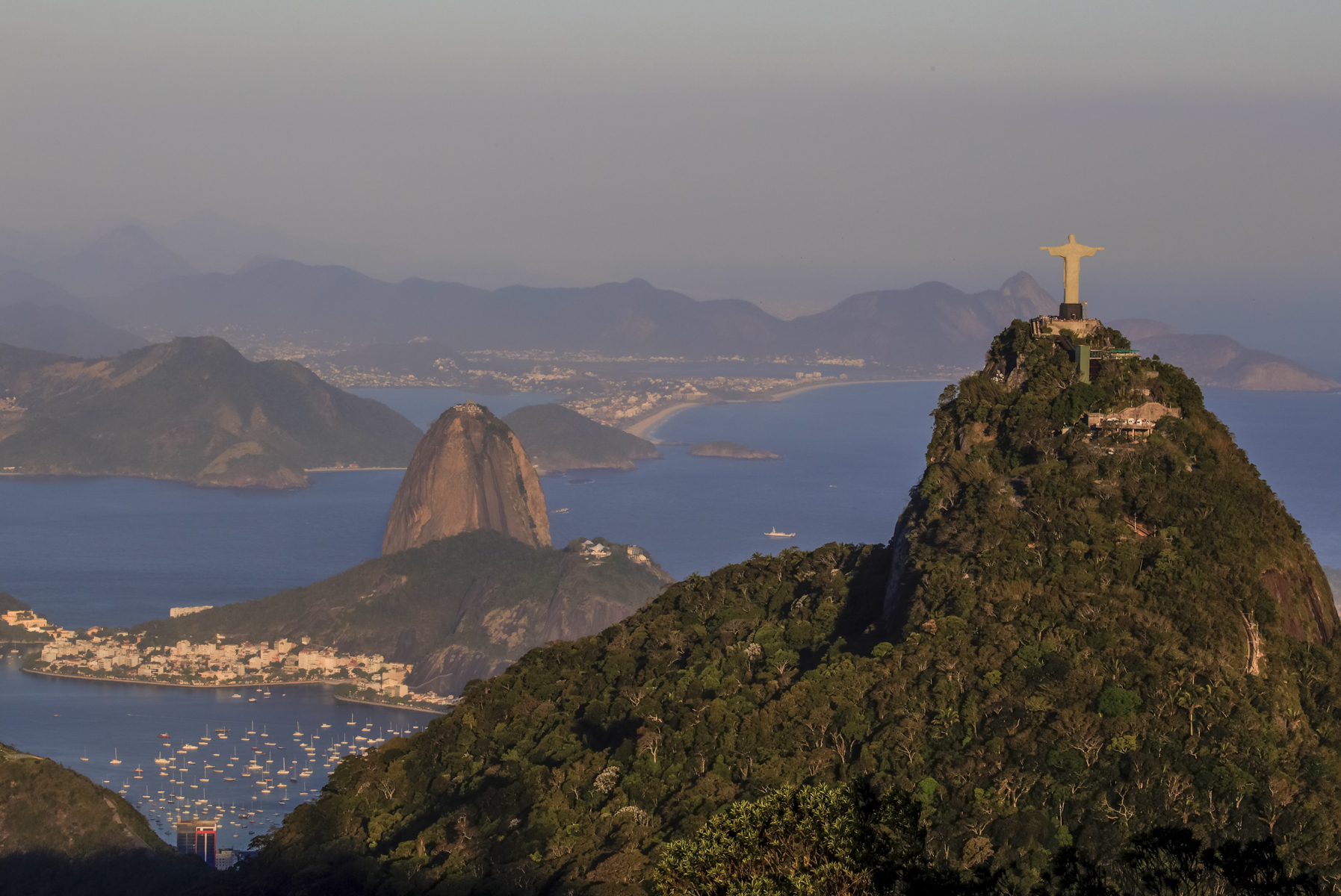
Christ the Redeemer atop Corcovado with Sugarloaf Mountain in background

In 1990, several organizations, including the Archdiocese of Rio de Janeiro, media company Grupo Globo, oil company Shell do Brasil, environmental regulator IBAMA, National Institute of Historic and Artistic Heritage, and the city government of Rio de Janeiro entered into an agreement to conduct restoration work.

More work on the statue and its environs was conducted in 2003 and early 2010. In 2003, a set of escalators, walkways, and elevators were installed to facilitate access to the platform surrounding the statue. The four-month restoration in 2010 focused on the statue itself. The statue's internal structure was renovated and its soapstone mosaic covering was restored by removing a crust of fungi and other microorganisms and repairing small cracks. The lightning rods located in the statue's head and arms were also repaired, and new lighting fixtures were installed at the foot of the statue.

The restoration involved one hundred people and used more than 60,000 pieces of stone taken from the same quarry as the original statue. During the unveiling of the restored statue, it was illuminated with green-and-yellow lighting in support of the Brazil national football team playing in the 2010 FIFA World Cup.

Maintenance work needs to be conducted periodically because of the strong winds and erosion to which the statue is exposed, as well as lightning strikes. The original pale stone is no longer available in sufficient quantity, and replacement stones are increasingly darker in hue.

Approximate heights of various notable statues: 1. Statue of Unity 240 m (790 ft) (incl. 58 m (190 ft) base); 2. Spring Temple Buddha 153 m (502 ft) (incl. 25 m (82 ft) pedestal and 20 m (66 ft) throne); 3. Statue of Liberty (Liberty Enlightening the World) 93 m (305 ft) (incl. 47 m (154 ft) pedestal); 4. The Motherland Calls 87 m (285 ft) (incl. 2 m (6 ft 7 in) pedestal); 5. Christ the Redeemer 38 m (125 ft) (incl. 8 m (26 ft) pedestal); 6. Michelangelo's David 5.17 m (17.0 ft) (excl. 2.5 m (8 ft 2 in) plinth)

== Similar structures ==
Angola

- Cristo Rei in Lubango (14 m, 46 ft)

Argentina/Chile

- Christ the Redeemer of the Andes

Bolivia

- Cristo de la Concordia in Cochabamba (34 m, 112 ft)

Brazil

- Cristo Luz in Balneário Camboriú, Santa Catarina
- Christ the Protector in Encantado, Rio Grande do Sul (43 m, 141 ft)
- Statue in Jataí, southern Goiás
- Christ in the Mount in Pitangui, Minas Gerais
- Christ the Redeemer in Rio Verde, Goiás

Colombia

- Cristo Rey in Cali (26 m, 85 ft)

Cuba

- Christ of Havana in Havana, inspired by Christ the Redeemer (20 m, 66 ft)

Dominican Republic

- Cristo Redentor, Puerto Plata

East Timor

- Cristo Rei of Dili in Dili (27 m, 89 ft)

Honduras

- Christ at El Picacho in Tegucigalpa

India

- Imitation statue of Christ the Redeemer at Nellore, state of Andhra Pradesh
- Imitation at St. Joseph Shrine, Vizhinjam, near Trivandrum, Kerala, India
- Imitation at Ecopark, Kolkata, India

Indonesia

- Christ Blessing in Manado, North Sulawesi (30 m, 98 ft)
- Patung Yesus Kristus in Mansinam Island, West Papua, Indonesia (30 m, 98 ft)

Italy

- Cristo Redentore (Christ the Redeemer) of Maratea (21 m, 69 ft)

Philippines

- Risen Christ statue on top of Tombol Hill in Rosario, Batangas

Lebanon

- Christ the King, past Nahr al-Kalb on the coast

Malaysia

- Christ the Redeemer of Malacca, on the Portuguese Settlement Square in Melaka (20 ft, 6.1 m)

Malta

- Tas-Salvatur in Gozo (12 m, 39 ft)

Mexico

- Cristo Rey on the Cerro del Cubilete in Guanajuato, inspired by Rio's Christ the Redeemer (23 m, 75 ft)
- Cristo del Sagrado Corazón, Villas San Pedro, Carretera Libre Tijuana Ensenada Km 37.5, Playa de Rosarito, Baja California (75 foot, 40 ton, steel and fiberglass, colored)
- Cristo Rey in Tenancingo, México (30 m, 98 ft)
- Cristo Rey, at Iglesia de San Martín de Porres near Colonia Los Álamos, Tijuana, Baja California (23 m, 75 ft 30 cm)
- Cristo de las Noas in Torreón (22 m, 72 ft)

Nigeria

- Jesus de Greatest in Imo, Africa's tallest statue of Jesus and fifth tallest statue on the continent (8.53 m, 28.0 ft)

Peru

- Cristo Blanco in Cusco
- Cristo del Pacífico in Lima, erected in 2011 (37 m, 121 ft)
- Cristo Redentor in Barranca Province, Lima Region, Peru
- Statue in Yungay

Poland

- Christ the King in Świebodzin (33 m, 108 ft)

Portugal

- Cristo Rei (Christ the King) in Almada (28 m, 92 ft)
- Cristo Rei, Madeira on Madeira island, completed in 1927 (15 m, 49 ft)

Romania

- Statuia Inima lui Iisus in Harghita. Built in 2011, it is 22 metres high and cost 200,000 euros, from donations.

Slovakia

- Statue of Jesus Christ, Klin (9.5 m, 31 ft)

Spain

- Statue of Jesus Christ on the top of Temple Expiatori del Sagrat Cor, Barcelona, Spain
- Statue of Jesus Christ, Monte Urgull, San Sebastián (12 m, 39 ft)
- Sagrat Cor de Jesus (Sacred Heart of Jesus), Ibiza, inspired by Christ the Redeemer (23 m, 75 ft)
- Sacred Heart of Jesus Monument, in Oviedo, built in 1980 (30 m, 98 ft)
- Cristo del Otero in Palencia, built in 1930 (21 m, 69 ft)

Switzerland

- Statue du Christ-Roi, Lens, Valais (30m)

United States of America

- Christ of the Ozarks near Eureka Springs, Arkansas, inspired by Rio's Christ the Redeemer (20 m, 66 ft)
- Christ of the Ohio in Troy, Indiana
- Cristo Rey by Urbici Soler in Sunland Park, New Mexico (8.83 m, 29.0 ft)

Vietnam

- Christ of Vũng Tàu in (32 m, 105 ft)

Others

- Christ of the Abyss in various underwater locations

== Gallery ==
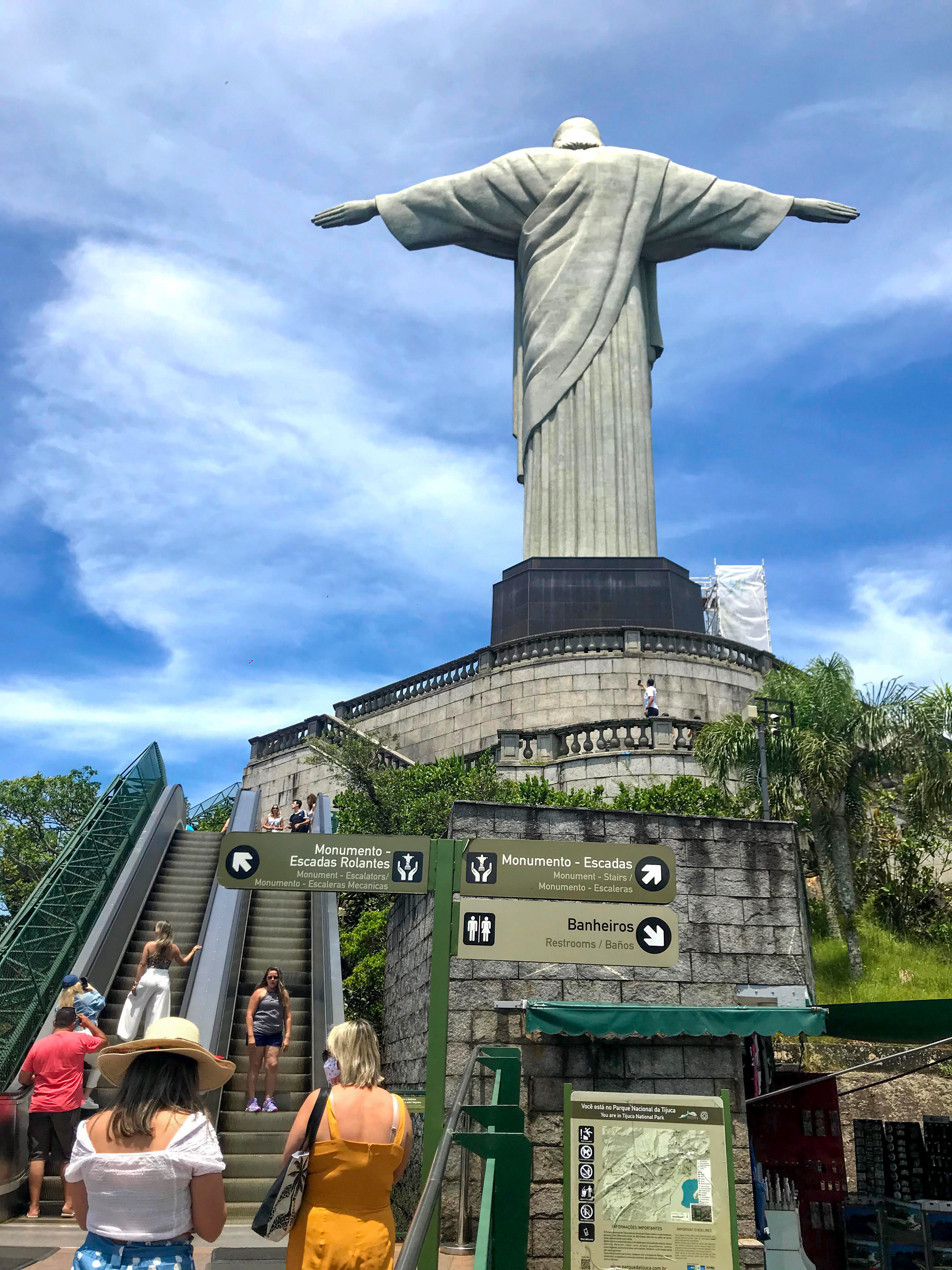
Access escalators

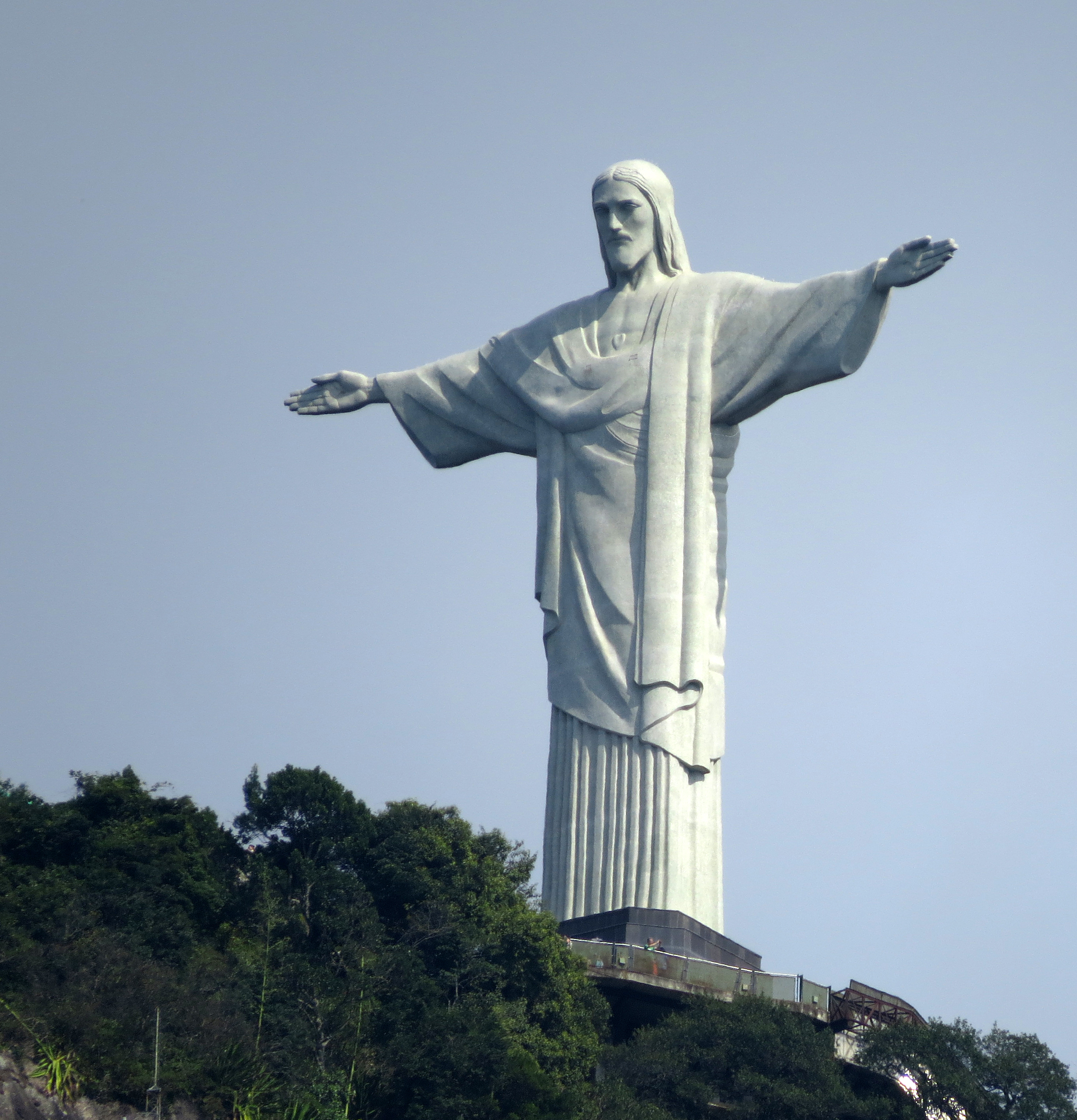
Christ the Redeemer after restoration

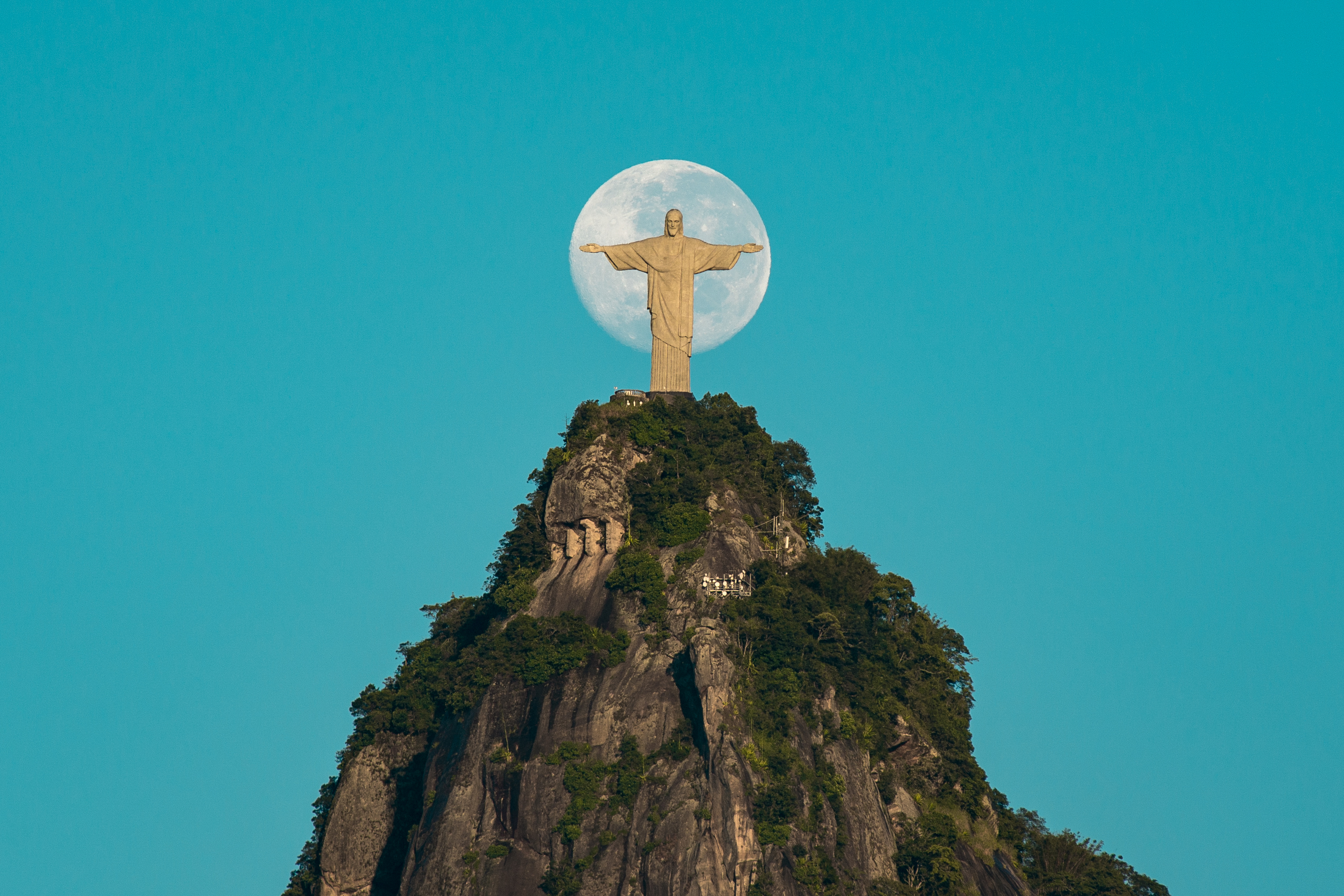
Christ the Redeemer with the Moon in the background

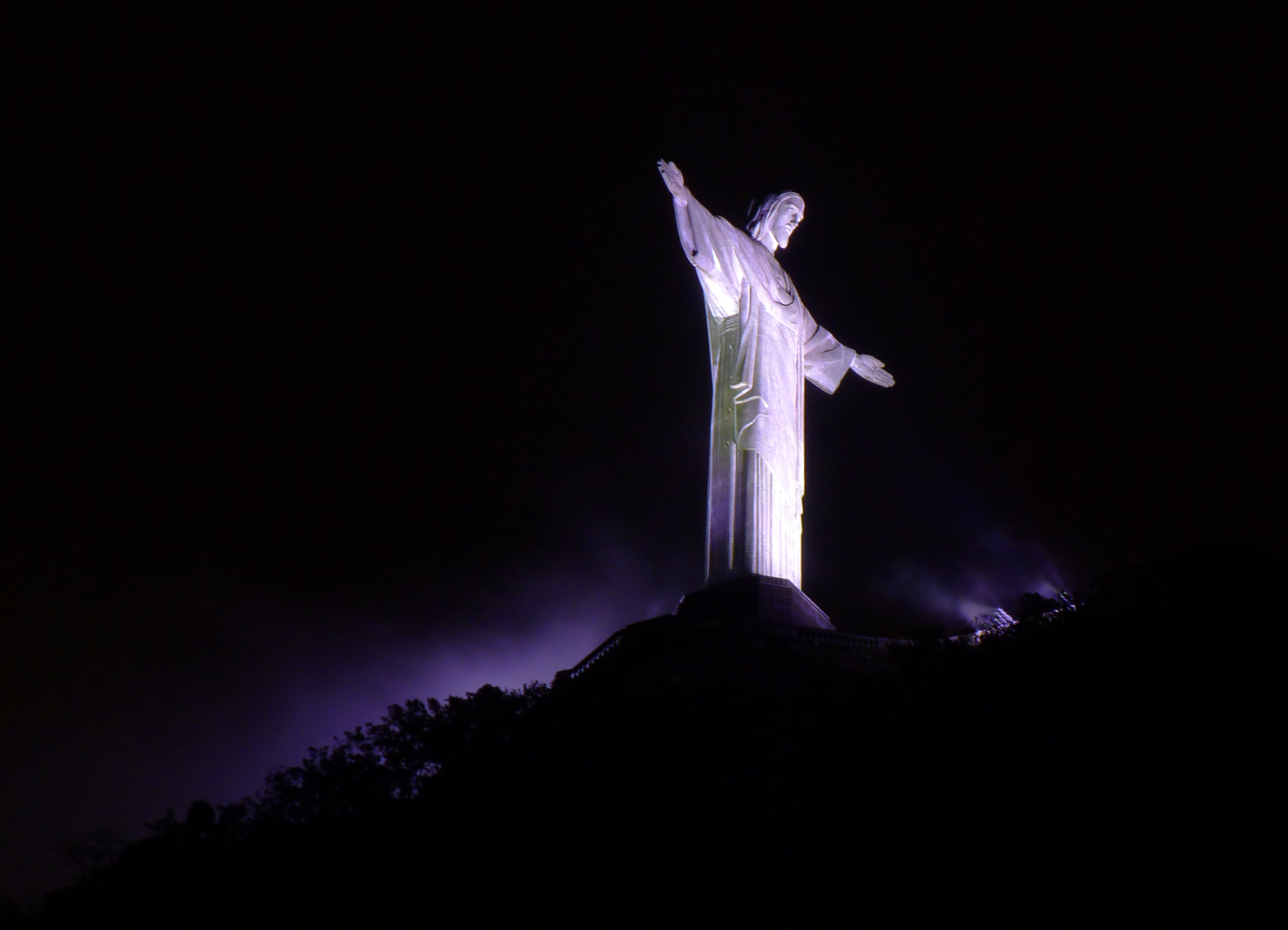
Christ the Redeemer at night

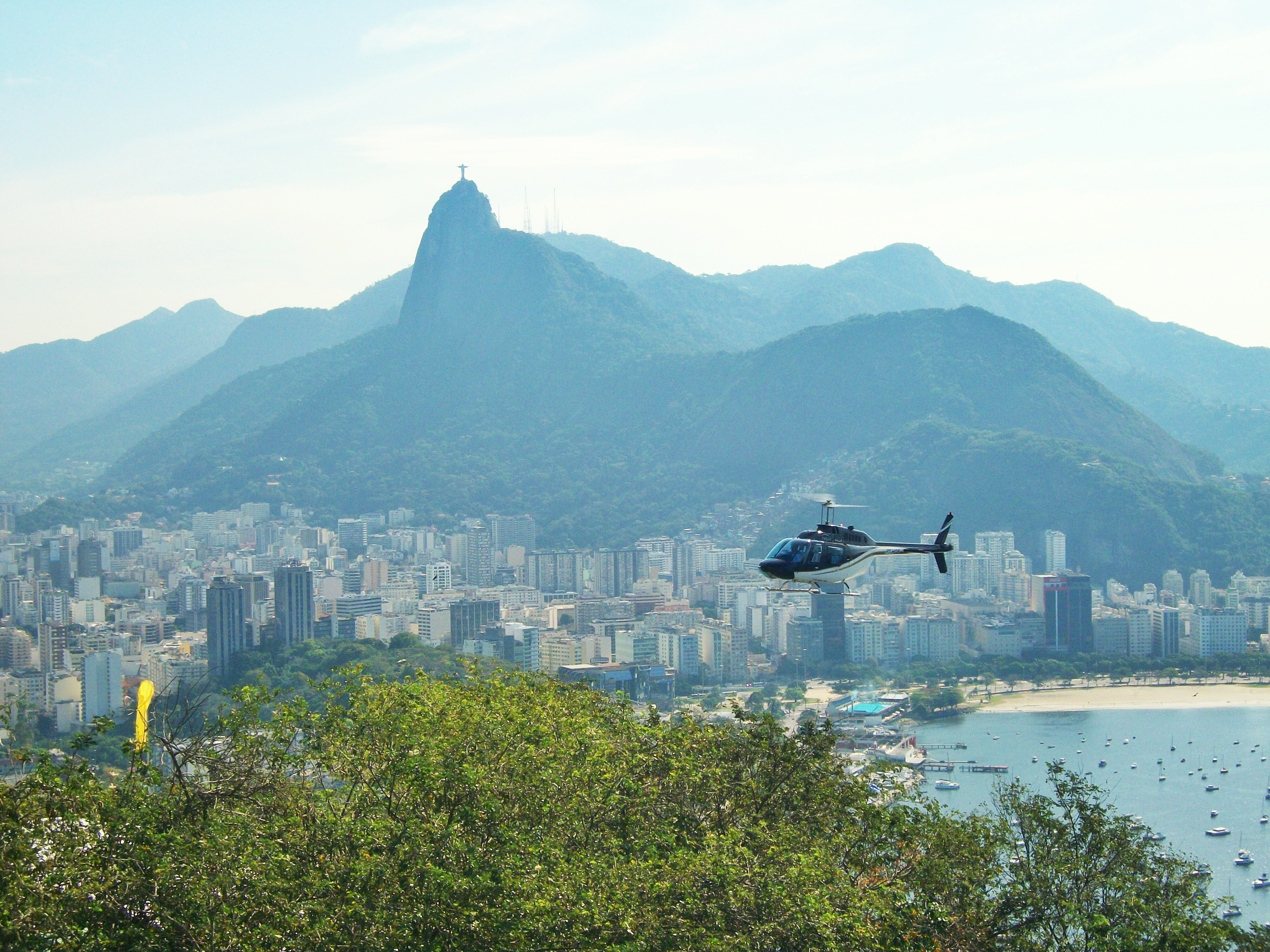
Corcovado and Christ the Redeemer as seen from Sugarloaf Mountain

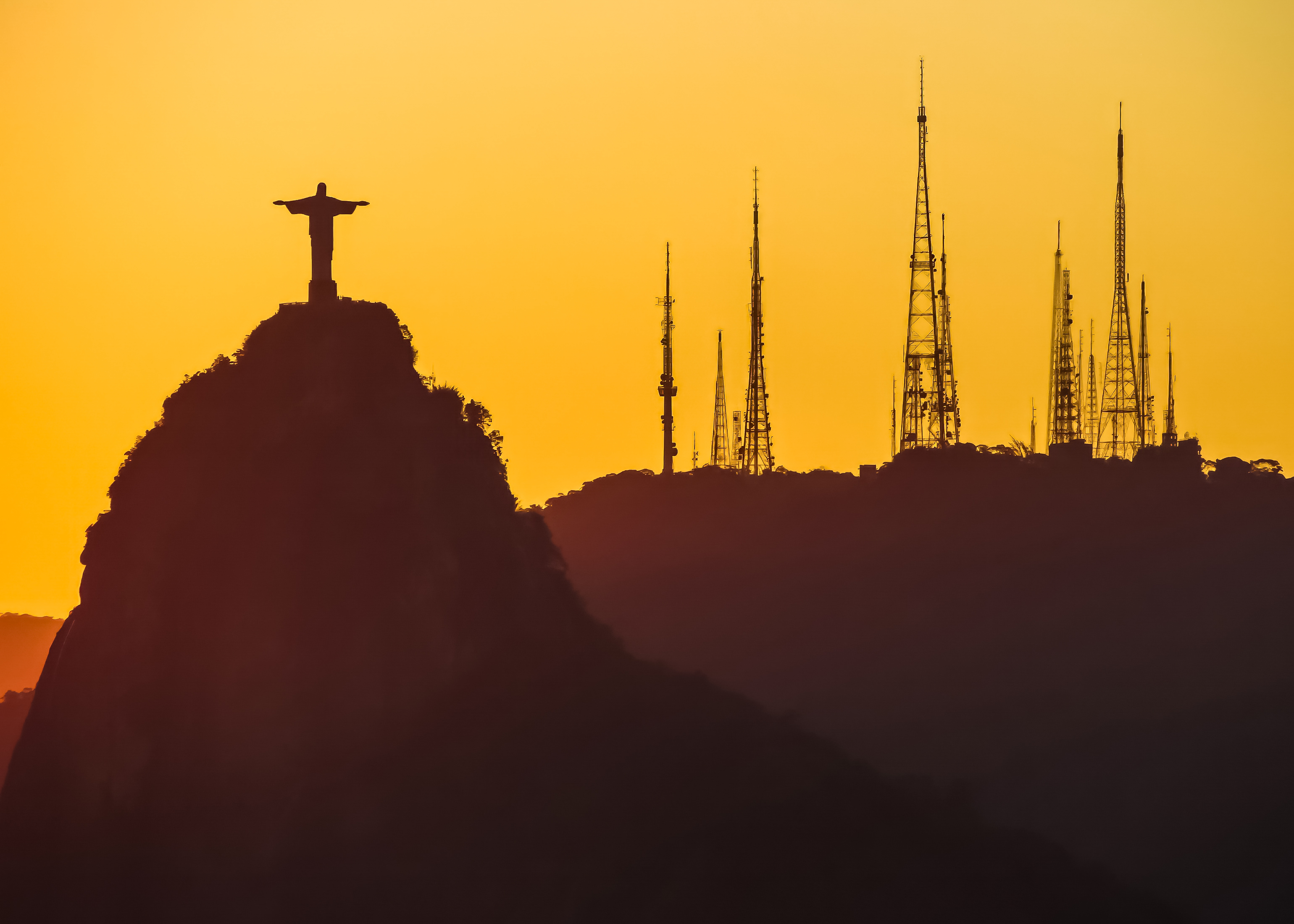
Corcovado and Christ the Redeemer as seen from Sugarloaf Mountain during sunset

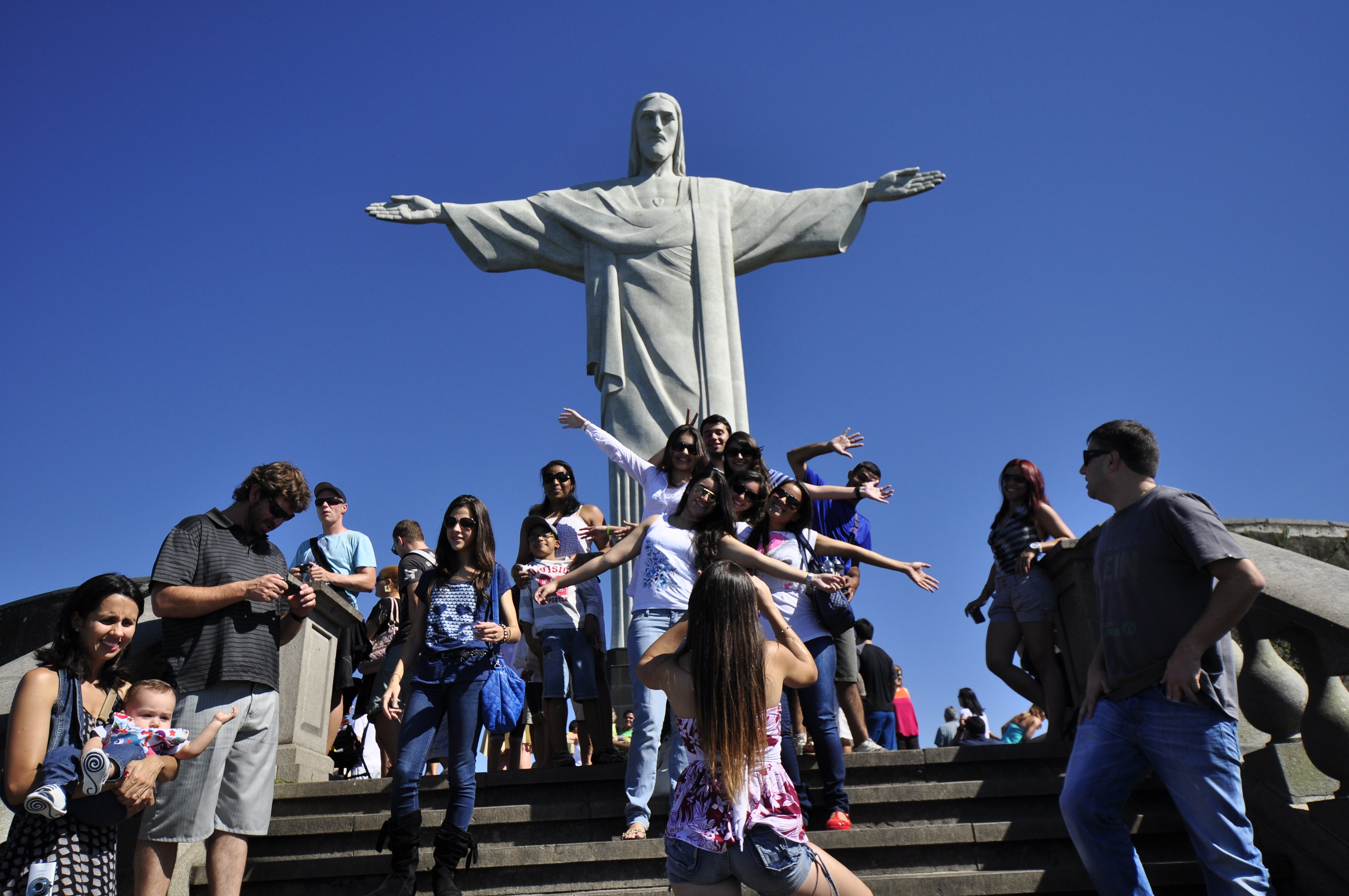
Visitors taking photos

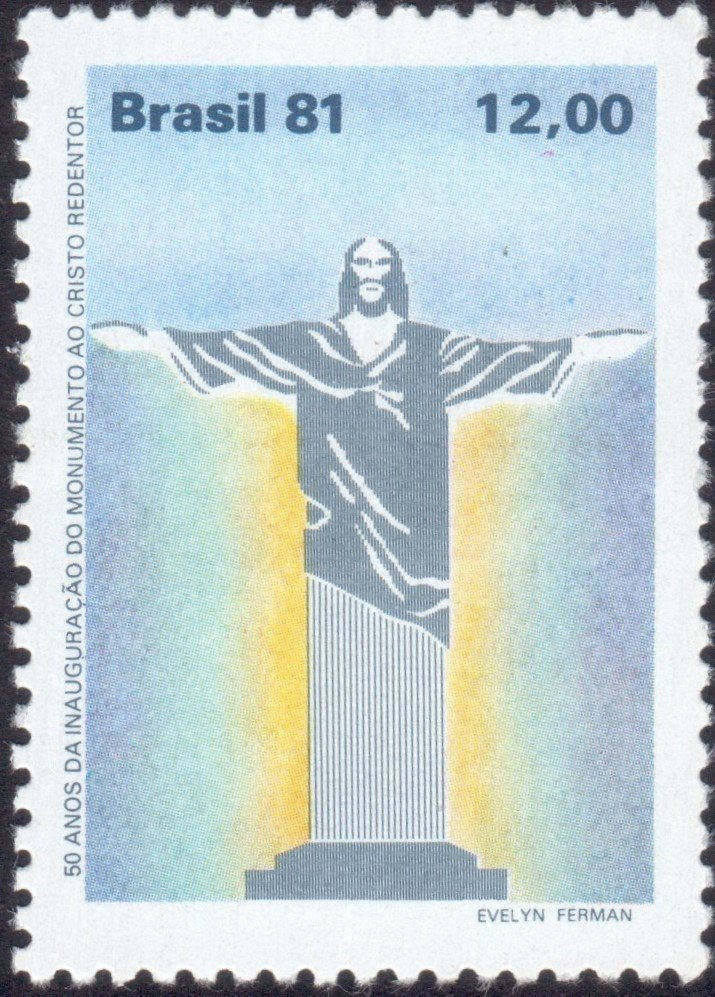
Depicted on a stamp

== See also ==
- List of statues of Jesus
- List of tallest statues
