= Cristo Redentor, Porto Alegre =

Neighborhood in Porto Alegre, Brazil

Coordinates: 30°00′42″S 51°09′26″W

Cristo Redentor (literally Christ the Redeemer in English) is a neighbourhood (bairro) in the city of Porto Alegre, the state capital of Rio Grande do Sul, in Brazil. It was created by Law 2022 from December 7, 1959.

The first inhabitants of this neighbourhood were Italian immigrants from Caxias do Sul. One of them was Giacomo Bernardi, who owned 30 hectare farm in the area, called Fazenda Moderna. Later it was divided into many lots.

Cristo Redentor was named after its church, which was built in 1933, just two years after the inauguration of the famous statue in Rio de Janeiro.

Two hospitals of Porto Alegre are located here.
