= Gheorghe Leonida =

Romanian sculptor

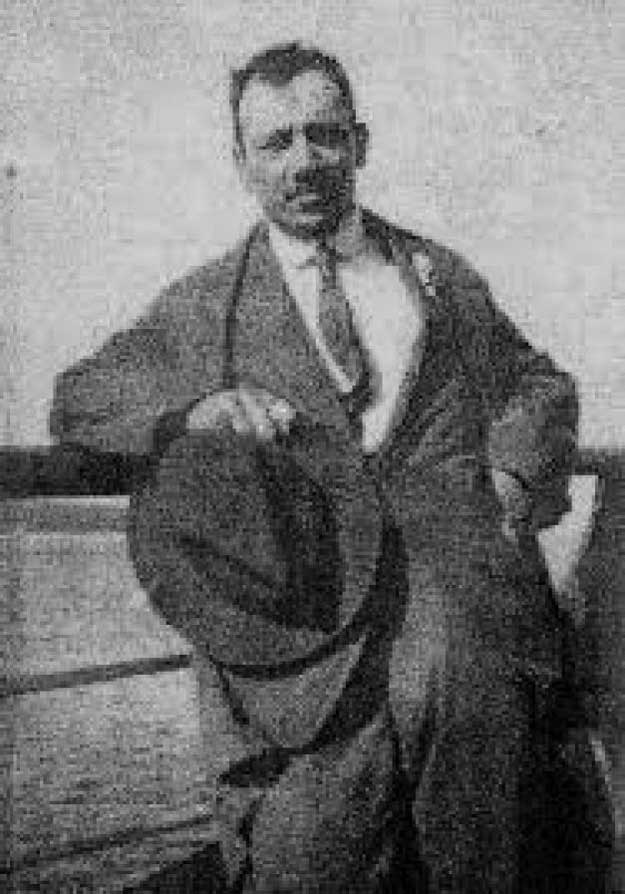
Gheorghe Leonida

Gheorghe Leonida (1892/93–1942) was a Romanian sculptor known for creating the head of Christ the Redeemer, the statue of Jesus Christ in Rio de Janeiro, Brazil.

== Biography ==
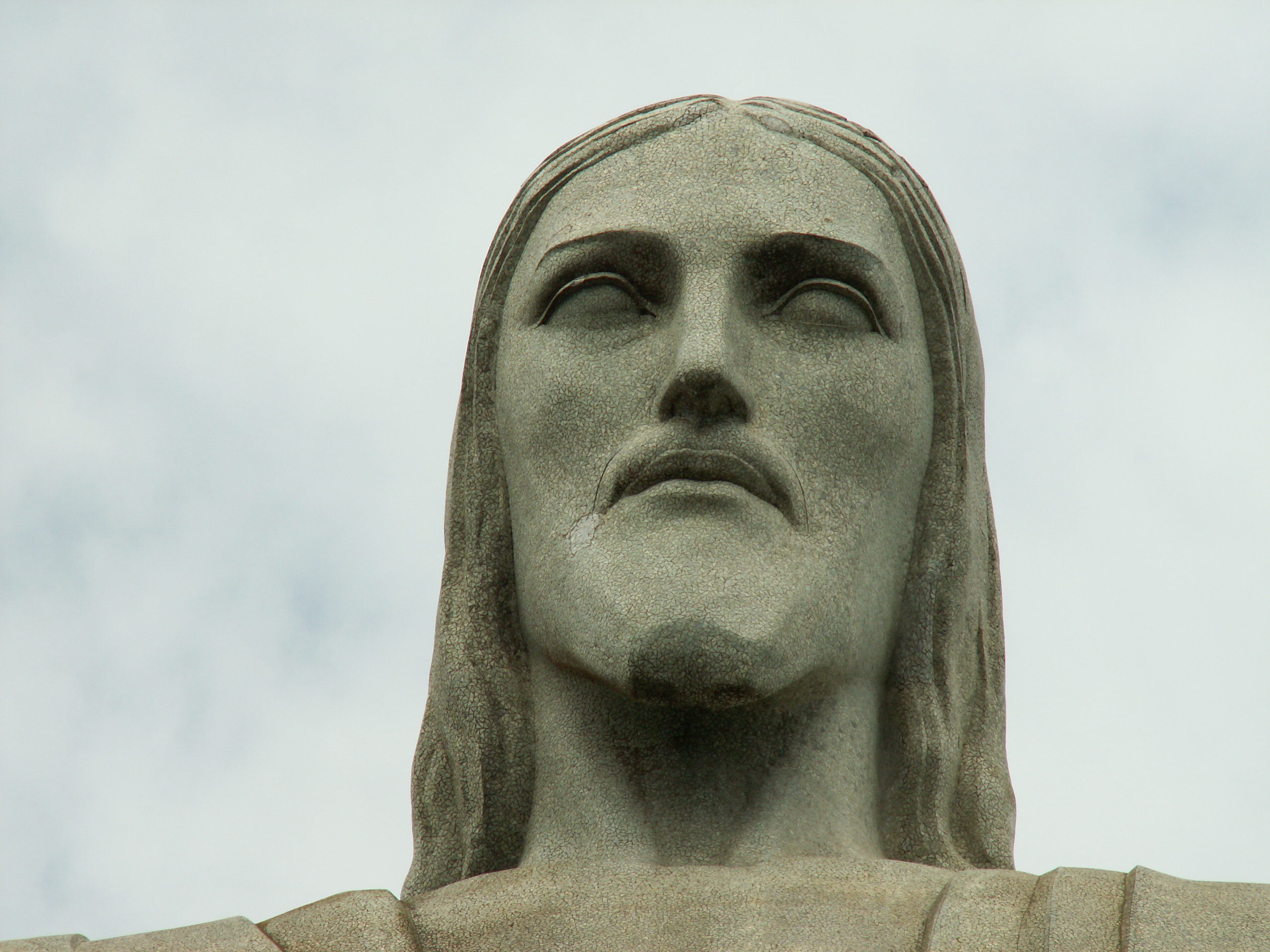
A close-up view of the face of Christ the Redeemer.

Gheorghe Leonida was born in Galați, in 1892 (1893 according to other sources). Coming from an influential middle-class family, he was the penultimate among 11 children. Among his siblings were the pioneering female engineer Elisa Leonida Zamfirescu and the engineer Dimitrie Leonida. When his father, a career officer, was forced to leave Galați, Gheorghe graduated from high school in Bucharest, where he then continued his studies at the department of sculpture of the Conservatory of Fine Arts. He made his debut in 1915, at a national salon. After fighting in World War I, Leonida continued art studies in Italy for three years, and his work received prizes in Rome (for the work Reveil) and Paris (Le Diable).

In 1925, he moved to Paris, where Paul Landowski had just received the commission to collaborate with Heitor da Silva Costa in the conclusion of the architectural monum Christ the Redeemer. Leonida was hired by Landowski to sculpt the statue's head. The work began in 1926, and was completed in 1931.

After his return to Romania, Leonida continued sculpting. His works can be seen at Bran Castle, the National Museum of Art and other major museums in Bucharest.

He died in the spring of 1942, falling off the roof of his family home in Bucharest, while picking linden flowers.
