= Dimitrie Leonida =

Romanian energy engineer

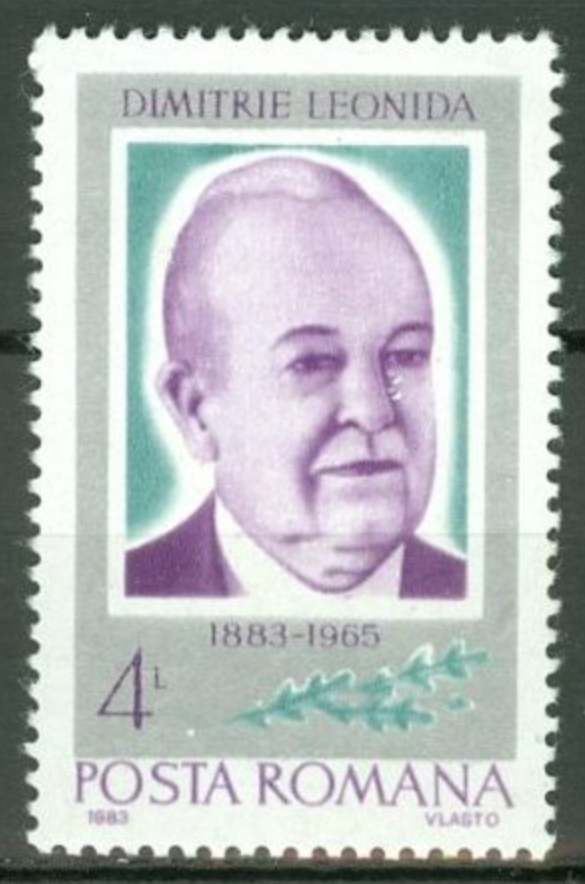
Leonida on a 1983 postage stamp

Dimitrie Leonida (May 23, 1883–March 14, 1965) was a Romanian energy engineer.

Born in Fălticeni, his father Atanase was a cavalry officer, while his mother (née Gill) was the daughter of a French building engineer. He had seven surviving siblings, and despite the family’s financial difficulties, all had distinguished careers, including Elisa Leonida Zamfirescu and Gheorghe Leonida. Frequently moving due to Atanase’s profession, Dimitrie ultimately graduated from Mihai Viteazul National College in Bucharest. He then entered the Technische Hochschule Charlottenburg, graduating with distinction in 1908. While a student, he proposed a subway system for Bucharest.

His thesis proposed what would become the Bicaz-Stejaru Hydroelectric Power Station late in his life, and he spent years advocating for the project. Meanwhile, after returning to Romania, Leonida was hired to direct electrification at Căile Ferate Române railway carrier. For decades, he promoted the electrification of Romania. In 1908, he founded the country’s first school for electricians and mechanics, teaching there without pay for 44 years. He also taught at Politehnica University of Timișoara (1924-1941) and at Politehnica University of Bucharest (1941-1945).

In 1909, he founded what would become the Dimitrie Leonida Technical Museum. The Communist regime awarded him the State Prize in 1954 and the Order of Labor in 1961. The Dimitrie Leonida station of the Bucharest Metro is named after him.
