= Heitor da Silva Costa =

Brazilian engineer and designer (1873–1947)

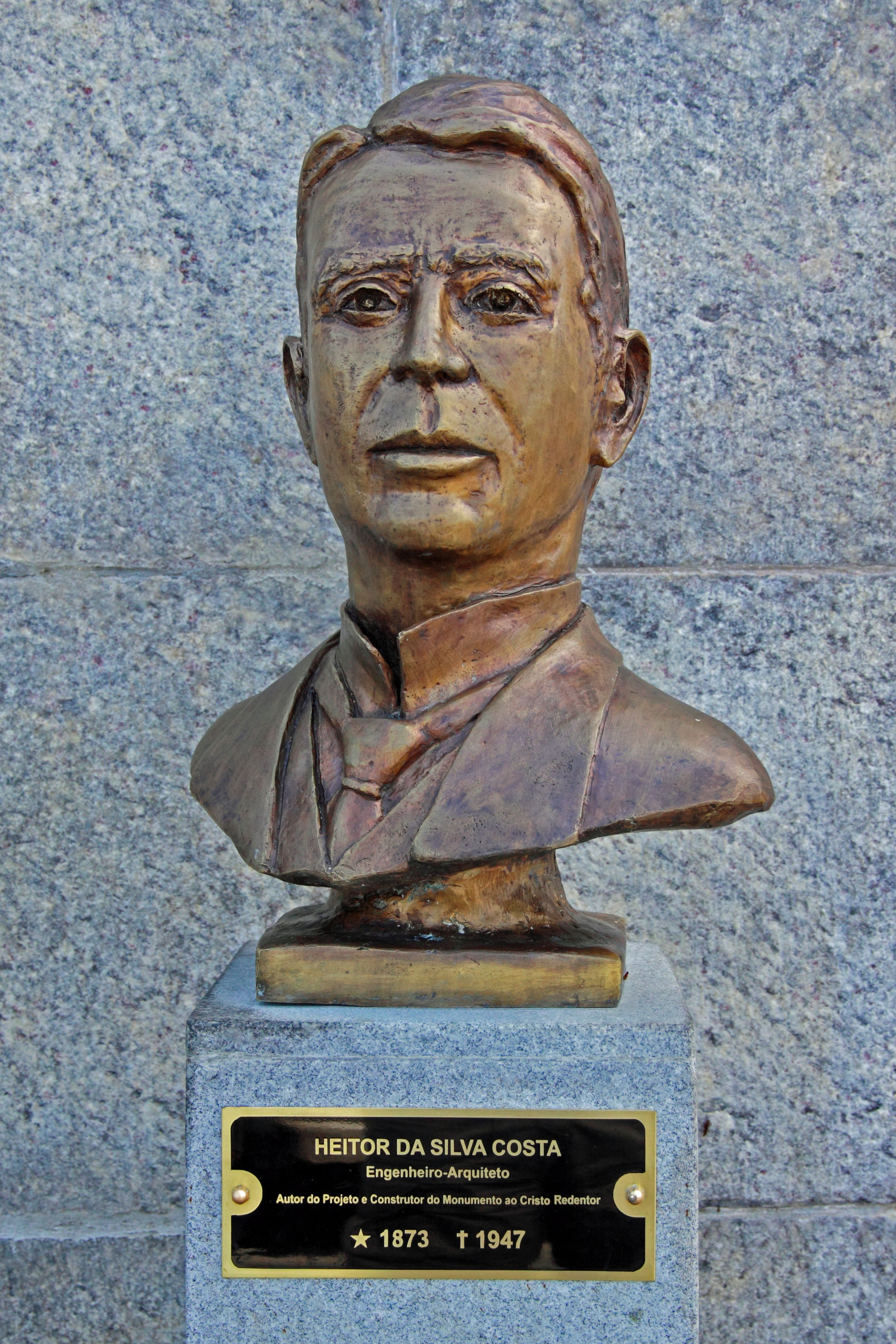
- Born: 25 July 1873; Rio de Janeiro, Brazil
- Died: 21 April 1947 (aged 73); Rio de Janeiro, Brazil
- Occupation: Architect
- Notable work: Christ the Redeemer statue
- Spouse: Maria Georgina Leitão da Cunha
- Children: 3
- Awards: Paulo de Frontin Award (1923)

Heitor da Silva Costa (25 July 1873 – 21 April 1947) was a Brazilian civil engineer, designer and constructor of the Christ the Redeemer monument in Rio de Janeiro. In 1924, he won a competition organised by the Catholic Church for the construction of the statue on Corcovado in Rio de Janeiro. The monument was inaugurated on 12 October 1931.

== Education ==
In 1883, at the age of eight, Silva Costa started formal schooling; he went to Colegio Abilio from 1883 to 1886. From 1886 to 1889 he attended Colégio São Pedro de Alcântara. He joined the Polytechnic School of Rio de Janeiro (1893-1897) to pursue engineering. He became an engineer and professor at the Polytechnic in 1914. He devoted himself to the construction of several buildings, churches and religious monuments, including monuments to the Baron of Rio Branco, Emperor D. Pedro II in the Boa Vista Park, and Louis Pasteur.

== Career ==
In 1924, Silva Costa won a Catholic Church competition for the construction of the monumental Christ the Redeemer statue on Corcovado in Rio de Janeiro. The competition commemorated the 100th anniversary of the independence of Brazil in 1822. Between 1924 and 1927, Silva Costa went to Europe to make final plans for the construction of the monument. He met the French sculptor Paul Landowski, with whom he collaborated to make the monument; Landowski designed the hands and head. The statue was completed and inaugurated on 12 October 1931.

Silva Costa later constructed the Cathedral of St. Peter of Alcantara, Sion College Notre Dame Chapel in Rio in 1940 and the Throne of Fatima in Petrópolis in 1947. He was member of the Engineering Club, the National Confederation of Catholic Workers (of which he was president) and the Brazilian Press Association.

== Family ==
Silva Costa was the son of Dr. Jose da Silva Costa and Eleia Guimaraes da Silva Costa of Portugal. He married Maria Georgina Leitão da Cunha and had three children: Maria Elisa, Paulo Cesar and Carlos Claudio.

== Sources ==
- Carnivale, Audry (18 November 2015). "Christ The Redeemer" – via Haiku Deck (www.haikudeck.com).
- "Christ the Redeemer: 10 things you did not know". Daytours4u. 11 September 2012 – via www.daytours4u.com.
- Miranda, André (18 August 2011). "Autoria do Cristo Redentor é disputada por herdeiros de Heitor da Silva Costa e do francês Paul Landowski" [Authorship of Christ the Redeemer is disputed by heirs of Heitor da Silva Costa and Frenchman Paul Landowski]. globo.com (in Portuguese).
- Martin, Percy Alvin (1940). Who's who in Latin America: A Biographical Dictionary of the Outstanding Living Men and Women of Spanish America and Brazil. Stanford University Press.
- "Christo Redemptor exposição" (PDF) (in Portuguese). 15 December 2006. Archived from the original on 4 April 2015 – via Bradesco Seguros (www.bradescoseguros.com.br).
