= Arvorezinha =

Municipality of Rio Grande do Sul, Brazil

Coordinates: 28°53′S 52°10′W

- Municipality
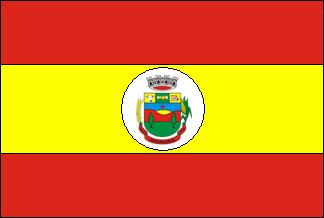
- Flag Coat of arms

- Within Rio Grande do Sul
- Country: Brazil
- State: Rio Grande do Sul
- Established: 02/16/1959

Government
  - Prefect: Clóvis Provensi Roman (PL) (PL)

Area
  - Total: 271.643 km^{2} (104.882 sq mi)
- Elevation: 750 m (2,460 ft)

Population (2020)
  - Total: 10,423
  - Density: 38.370/km^{2} (99.378/sq mi)
- Demonym: arvorezinhense
- Time zone: UTC−3 (BRT)

Arvorezinha (Portuguese: [ˌaʁ.vo.ɾiˈzĩ.ɲɐ]) is a municipality in the state of Rio Grande do Sul, Brazil. It literally means "small tree".

== History ==
The municipality's first inhabitant was Lino Figueira, who settled in the region c. 1900. Much of the incoming population were Italian immigrants from the nearby cities of Antônio Prado, Veranópolis, Bento Gonçalves, Caxias do Sul and Garibaldi, who started settling during the early 20th century. Before its establishment as a municipality, which was official as of February 16, 1959, the land belonged to Taquari and later Encantado.

== See also ==
- List of municipalities in Rio Grande do Sul
