= Elisa Leonida Zamfirescu =

Romanian engineer

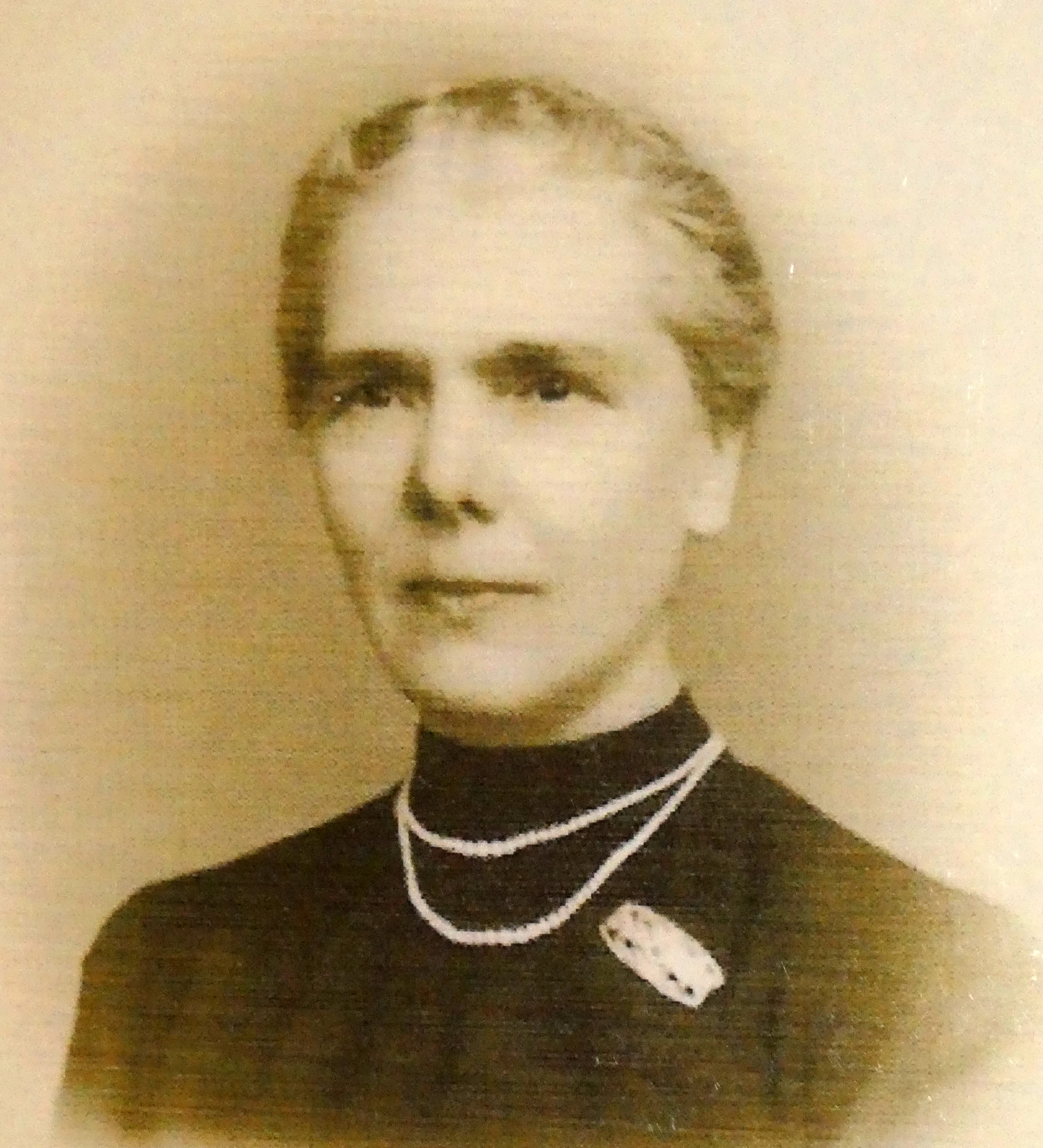
- Portrait of Zamfirescu
- Born: Elisa Leonida; 10 November 1887; Galați, Kingdom of Romania
- Died: 25 November 1973 (aged 86); Bucharest, Socialist Republic of Romania
- Occupation: Engineer
- Spouse: Constantin Zamfirescu
- Children: 2
- Parents: Atanase Leonida; Matilda Gill
- Relatives: Dimitrie Leonida (brother); Gheorghe Leonida (brother)

Elisa Leonida Zamfirescu (10 November 1887 – 25 November 1973) was a Romanian engineer who was one of the first women to obtain a degree in engineering. She was born in the Romanian town of Galați but qualified in Berlin. During World War I she managed a hospital in Romania.

== Early life and education ==
Elisa Zamfirescu was born in Galați, Romania, on 10 November 1887. Her father, Atanase Leonida, was a career officer while her mother, Matilda Gill, was the daughter of a French-born engineer. She was one of 11 children; among her siblings were Dimitrie Leonida, also an engineer, and Gheorghe Leonida, a sculptor.

Due to prejudices against women in the sciences, Zamfirescu was rejected by the School of Bridges and Roads in Bucharest. In 1909 she was accepted at the Technische Hochschule in Charlottenburg (now Technische Universität Berlin). She graduated in 1912, with a degree in engineering. It has been claimed that Zamfirescu was the world's first female engineer, but Englishwoman Nina Cameron Graham also gained a degree in civil engineering in 1912, from the University of Liverpool and the Irish engineer Alice Perry graduated six years before either of them, in 1906.

== Career ==
Returning to Romania, Zamfirescu worked as an assistant at the Geological Institute of Romania. During World War I, she joined the Red Cross and ran a hospital at Mărășești. In 1917 her hospital received the wounded from the Battle of Mărășești between the German and the Romanian armies. It was a victory by Romania over 28 days during which there were over 12,000 Romanian and over 10,000 of the invaders who were wounded.

Around this time, she met and married chemist Constantin Zamfirescu, brother of the politician and writer Duiliu Zamfirescu.

After the war, Zamfirescu returned to the Geological Institute. She led several geology laboratories and participated in various field studies, including some that identified new resources of coal, shale, natural gas, chromium, bauxite and copper. Zamfirescu also taught physics and chemistry.

== Leadership, Responsibilities and Challenges ==
Elisa Leonida Zamfirescu emerged as a respected leader in wartime medical services. Although not a physician, she used her skills in organization and determination to support the doctors and nurses under her charge. Her leadership responsibilities at Mărășești included managing a staff of military doctors, surgeons, nurses (many of them volunteers like herself), and orderlies. She organized rotas for surgeries and nursing shifts to ensure continuous care. Logistically, Zamfirescu coordinated with both the army’s medical corps and the Red Cross headquarters to request needed supplies or evacuations for severe cases.

One of her notable contributions to care was maintaining discipline and morale in the hospital under bombardment. The front at Mărășești was close enough that the thunder of artillery was frequently heard. There were occasions when the field hospital itself was in danger – whether from stray shellfire or air bombardment – yet Zamfirescu is credited with keeping calm and "disregarding danger" in order to tend the wounded. A French observer noted in an official report that she showed “good qualities of abnegation and disregard for danger” during the most perilous moments. This praise referred to her conduct amid a typhus epidemic, illustrating how she personally took on risky tasks. In one instance, Zamfirescu nursed a French officer who had contracted typhus in the hospital at Vaslui, another war front location, directly providing him care despite the contagion. This level of hands-on courage was unusual for someone in a managerial position and earned her great respect.

Historical records highlight several challenges Zamfirescu faced and overcame:

- Infectious Disease Control: The typhus epidemic of 1917 was ravaging Romania’s soldiers and even medical staff – dozens of doctors and nurses died of typhus while treating patients. Zamfirescu’s willingness to treat infectious patients herself set an example for her staff. Her heroic efforts during the typhus outbreak helped contain its spread in the facilities she managed.
- Gender Barriers: As a woman leading military hospitals, Zamfirescu had to contend with skepticism from some male colleagues. However, by 1917 her performance had largely silenced any doubters. The fact that she, one of Europe’s first female engineers, was effectively running a wartime hospital was noted as a remarkable role reversal for the era. (Earlier in her life she had faced prejudice in education, but on the battlefield, merit mattered most and she proved equal to male counterparts.)
- Exhaustion and Trauma: The relentless stream of gruesome injuries and high death toll would have been mentally and physically exhausting. Zamfirescu, described as “very zealous” and dedicated by those who saw her work, seemed to possess a tireless energy. She often slept little, making rounds to check on patients and encouraging her medical staff even during lulls in fighting. Her presence and leadership boosted the hospital team’s morale, which was crucial to keep everyone going through the worst phases of the battle.

== Later life and death ==
Zamfirescu retired in 1963, aged 75. In retirement she was involved in activism for disarmament. She died at the age of 86 on 25 November 1973.

An award for women working in science and technology was established in her name, the Elisa Leonida-Zamfirescu Prize.

== Honours and awards ==
Zamfirescu was the first woman member of AGIR (General Association of Romanian Engineers). A street in Sector 1 of Bucharest bears her name, and she was honoured with a Google Doodle on the anniversary of her birthday in 2018.
