= Paul Landowski =

French sculptor (1875–1961)

Olympic medal record

Art competitions at the Summer Olympics
Gold medal – first place	1928 Amsterdam	Sculpture

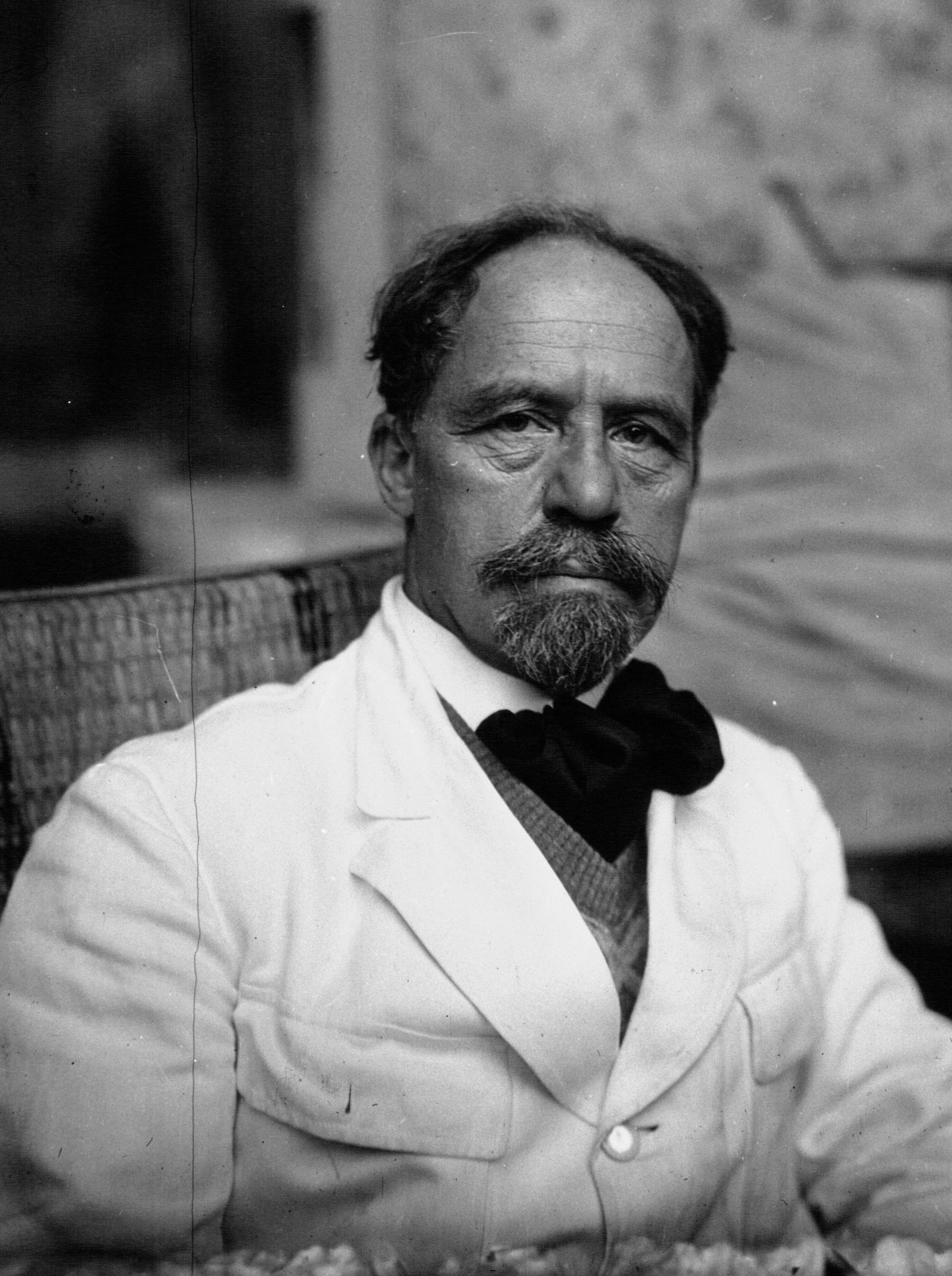
Paul Landowski (1932)

Paul Maximilien Landowski (1 June 1875 – 31 March 1961) was a French monument sculptor of Polish descent. His best-known work is Christ the Redeemer in Rio de Janeiro, Brazil.

== Biography ==
Landowski was born in Paris to a Polish father, refugee of the January Uprising, and a French mother: Julie Vieuxtemps, daughter of Henri Vieuxtemps. He studied at the Académie Julian, before graduating from the École nationale supérieure des Beaux-Arts; he won the Prix de Rome in 1900 with his statue of David, and went on to a fifty-five-year career. He produced over thirty-five monuments in the city of Paris and twelve more in the surrounding area. Among these is the Art Deco figure of St. Geneviève on the 1928 Pont de la Tournelle.

During World War I, he fought in the Battle of the Somme among others, which led to his being awarded the Citation of the Order of the Artillery Brigade and the Croix de Guerre. The war greatly impacted his art, and soon after the Armistice, he created Les Fantomes, the French Memorial to the Second Battle of the Marne which stands upon the Butte de Chalmont in Northern France, and the two major Monuments aux Morts in French North Africa, respectively known as Le Pavois in Algiers (concealed since 1978 in the Memorial to the Liberation of Algeria) and the monument à la victoire et à la paix in Casablanca (originally on today's Mohammed V Square, relocated to France in 1961 and re-erected in 1965 in Senlis).

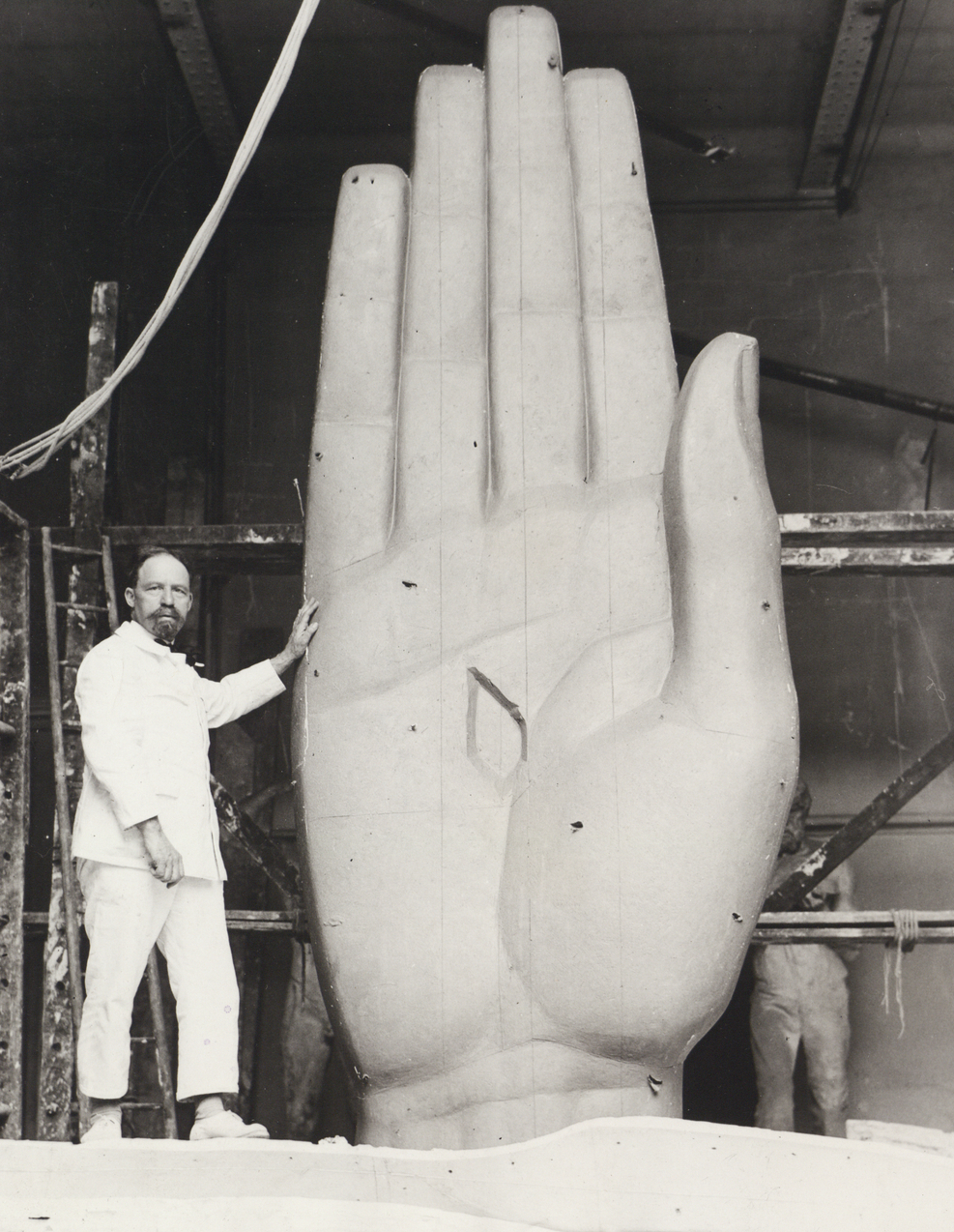
Landowski with the hand of Christ the Redeemer

Landowski is widely known for the 1931 Christ the Redeemer statue in Rio de Janeiro: this project was a collaboration with civil engineer Heitor da Silva Costa and architect and sculptor Gheorghe Leonida. Some sources indicate Landowski designed Christ's head and hands, but it was Leonida who created the head when asked by Landowski.

His statue entitled "The Boxer" won a gold medal at the art competitions at the 1928 Summer Olympics for Sculpture, which was part of the art competitions at the summer Olympics from 1912 to 1952. The medal accelerated his fame and resulted in high-profile commissions around the world. From 1933 to 1937, he was Director of the French Academy in Rome. He also served as an art–juror with Florence Meyer Blumenthal in awarding the Prix Blumenthal, a grant awarded between 1919–1954 to young French painters, sculptors, decorators, engravers, writers and musicians.

Landowski married Geneviève Nénot in 1907 and had two children: the painter Nadine Landowski (1908–1943) and agricultural engineer and Legion d’Honneur Jean Maximilian Landowski (1911-1944), both of whom died during World War II. Geneviève died in 1912, and he married Amélie Cruppi, who gave him two more children: composer Marcel Landowski (1915–1999), and pianist and painter Françoise Landowski-Caillet (1917–2007).

After a heart attack in 1961, Landowski died in Boulogne-Billancourt, a suburb of Paris, where a museum dedicated to his work has over 100 works on display.

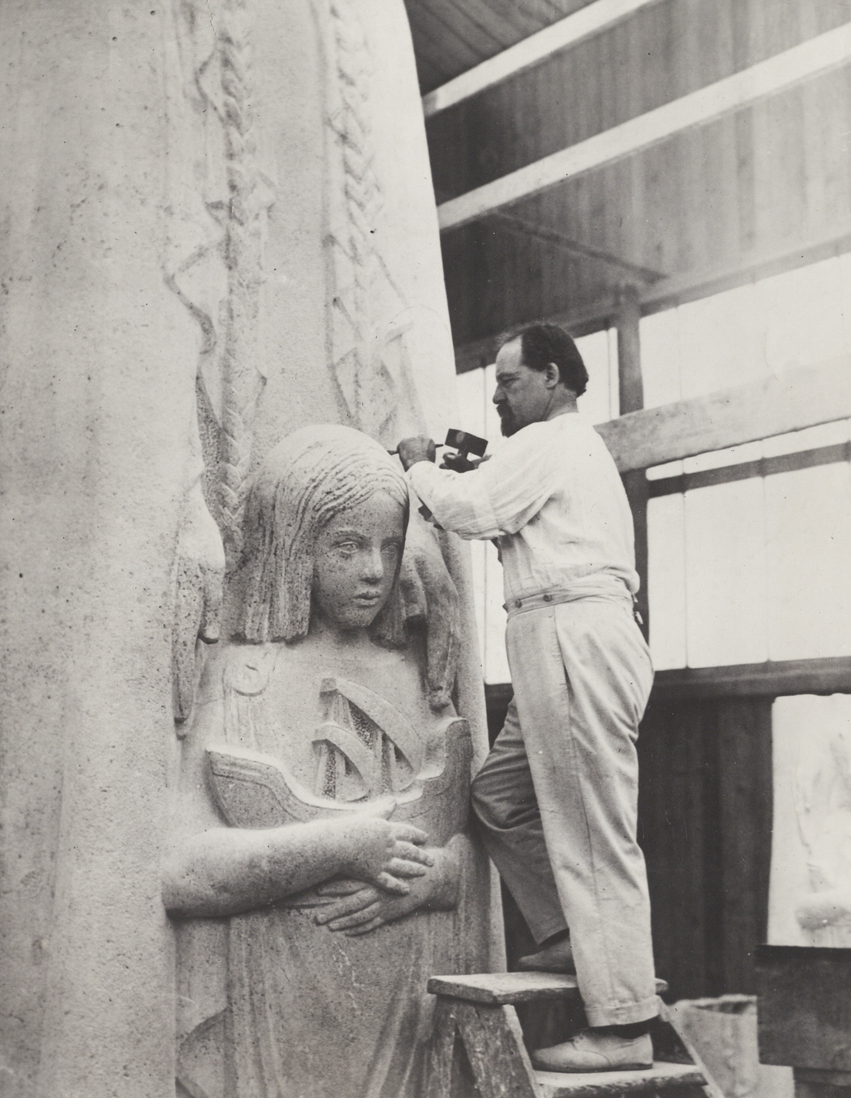
Landowski working on a statue of Saint-Geneviève
