= Patung Yesus Kristus =

Statue of Jesus Christ in Indonesia

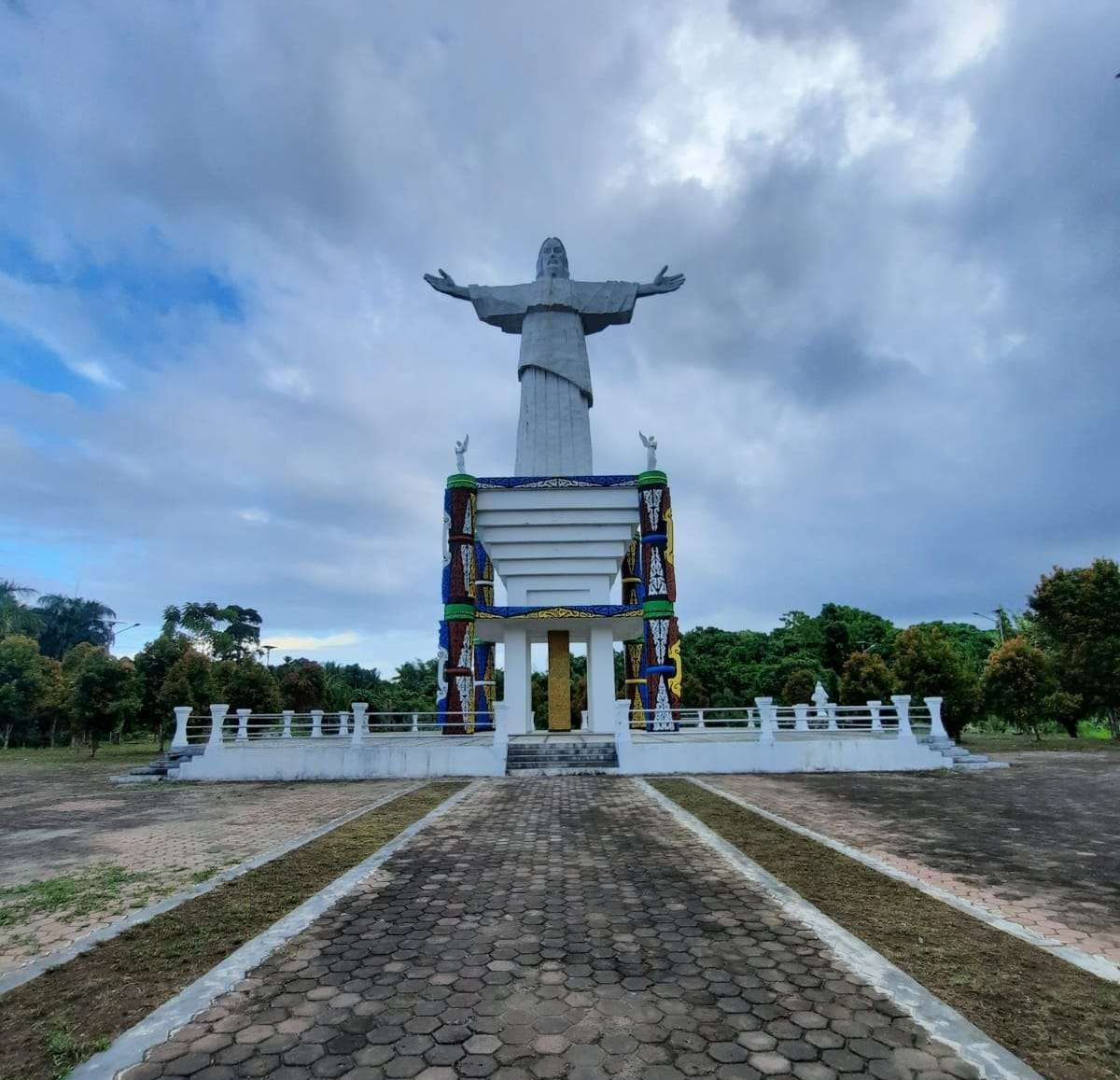

Patung Yesus Kristus is a statue of Jesus Christ located on Mansinam Island, Manokwari Regency, West Papua, Indonesia. The structure stands at the height of 29.5 metres (14.5 metres of statue and 15 metres of pedestal). The project was inaugurated on August 24, 2014, by President Susilo Bambang Yudhoyono near the end of his last term being the president.

== See also ==
- List of statues of Jesus
