= Dimitrie Leonida Technical Museum =

Museum in Bucharest, Romania

Coordinates: 44.41769°N 26.09617°E

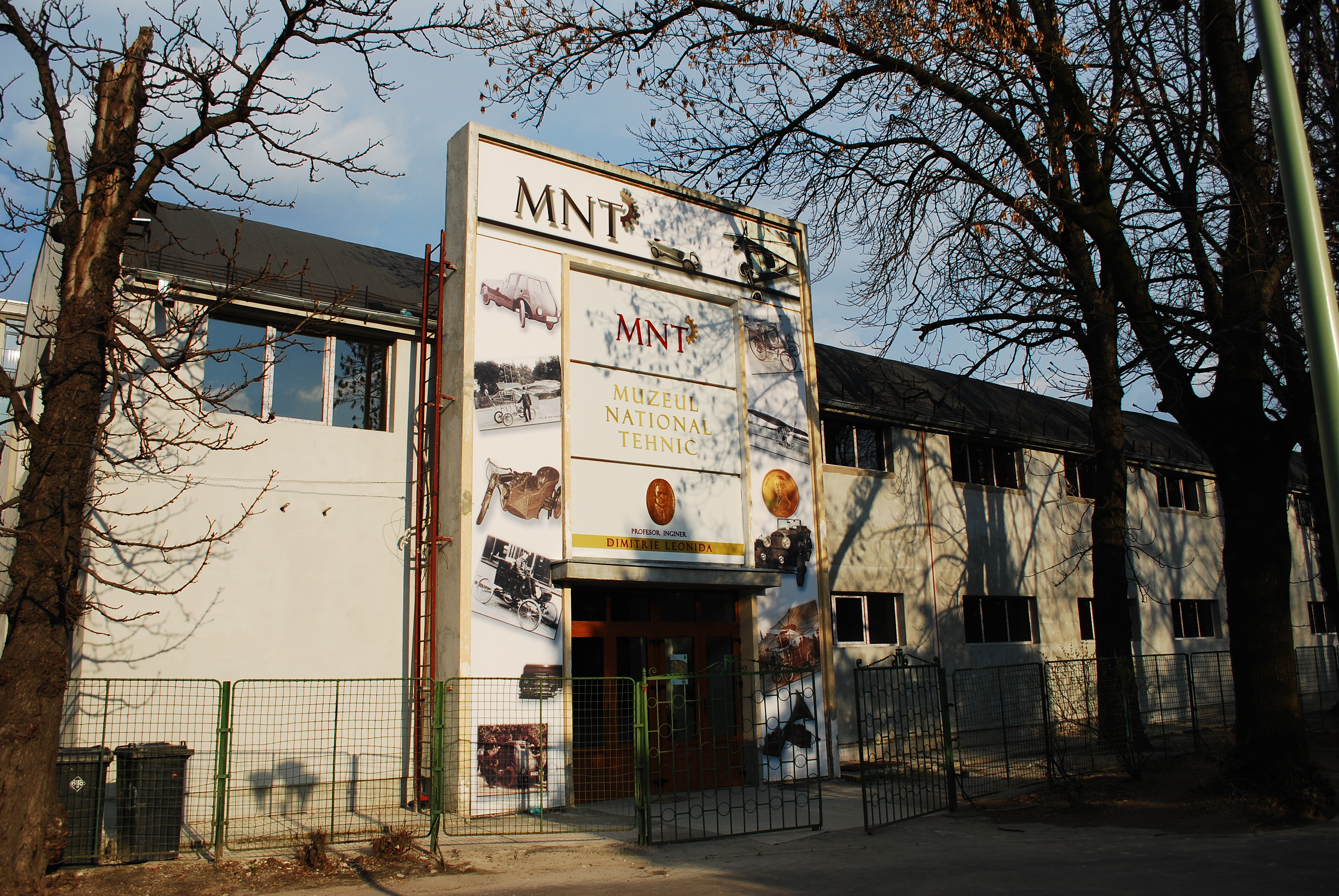
Museum entrance

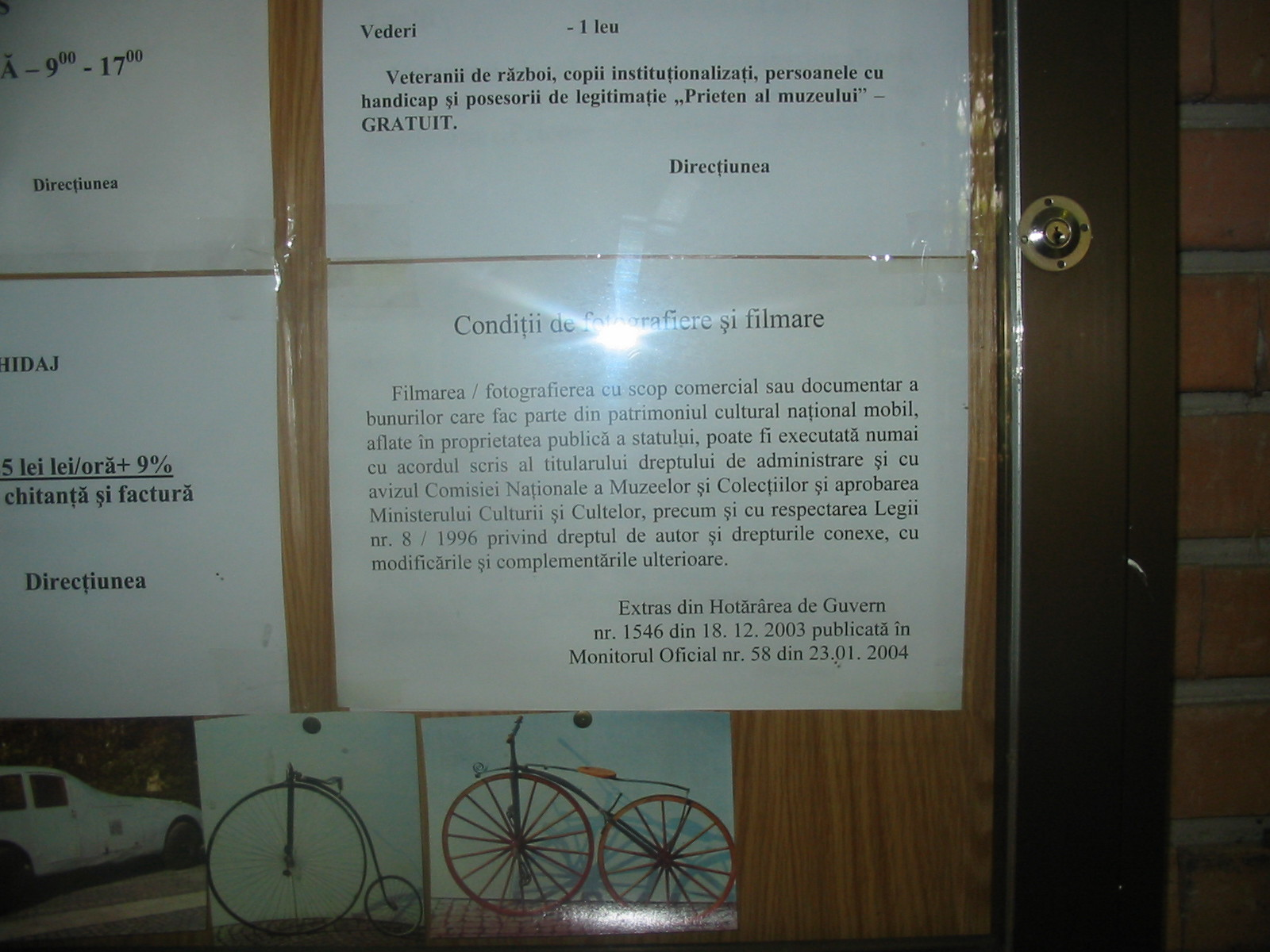
One of the rare museums, where government approval is needed to take pictures

The Dimitrie Leonida Technical Museum was founded in 1909 by Dimitrie Leonida, inspired by the München Technical Museum, he had visited during his studies in Charlottenburg Polytechnic Institute. In 1908, with the help of the first promotions of mechanics and electricians from his school, the first in Romania, Leonida collected the first objects for the museum. What is different in the Leonida museum was the educational orientation of the museum and also the interactivity.
