= Françoise Landowski-Caillet =

French painter

Françoise Landowski-Caillet (3 March 1917 –12 December 2007) was a French pianist and painter.

== Biography ==
Born in Boulogne-Billancourt, Landowski-Caillet was the daughter of the sculptor of Polish origin Paul Landowski and by her mother great-granddaughter of the composer Henri Vieuxtemps, the sister of the composer Marcel Landowski, of the painter Nadine Landowski (1908–1943) and of Jean-Maximilien Landowski (1911–1944), who died while fightling for France in World War II. Born in 1917, having spent a long time in Italy in the 1920s when her father directed the Villa Médicis, she was a pupil of Marguerite Long and pursued a career as an international virtuoso pianist after the war and until the 1970s. She then became a piano teacher at the Conservatoire de Saint-Denis while beginning a second career as a painter. She merged her two artistic expressions in the 1980s by creating concert exhibitions where she played works by composers who had inspired paintings exhibited and projected during concerts – notably around Debussy, Ravel and Mussorgsky. Her repertoire included an important religious dimension, since she began with the Way of the Cross in St. Peter's Church in Brusc (at Six-Fours-les-Plages, Var) and ends, in the early 2000s, with the Way of the Cross of the Church of Lônes, still in Six-Fours-les-Plages. She died in 2007.

She was the wife of Gérard Caillet, French writer, author of several booklets for Marcel Landowski. She was also the mother of the ethnologist Laurence Caillet-Tchang, a Japan specialist, and Elisabeth Caillet-Durieu, a philosopher.
