= List of mayors of Anta Gorda =

This is a list of mayors of Anta Gorda, Brazil.

#	Portrait	Name	Term in office	Time in office	Party affiliation	Election	Vice mayor
10		Arminho Miotto	April 7, 1964 – January 31, 1969	4 years, 300 days	MDB	1964	Milton Bertuol
11		Genoino Dallé	February 1, 1969 – January 31, 1973	4 years	ARENA	1968	Romildo Bochi
12		Neori Luiz Dalla Vecchia	February 1, 1973 – January 31, 1977	4 years	ARENA	1972	Telmo Luiz Arossi
14		Aldi João Bisleri	February 1, 1977 – January 31, 1983	6 years	ARENA	1976	Balduíno Blanger
		Neori Luiz Dalla Vecchia	February 1, 1983 – December 31, 1988	5 years, 335 days	PDS	1982	Telmo Luiz Arossi
15		Ermani João Cauzzi	January 1, 1989 – December 31, 1992	4 years	PMDB	1988	Odir Antônio Goldoni
16		Aldi João Bisleri	January 1, 1993 – December 31, 1996	4 years	PMDB	1992	Eraldo José Leão Marques
17		Carlos Francisco Dametto	January 1, 1997 – December 31, 2000	4 years	PPB	1996	?
18		Eraldo José Leão Marques	January 1, 2001 – December 31, 2004	4 years	PT	2000	?
19		Vanderlei Antônio Moresco	January 1, 2005 – December 31, 2012	8 years	PMDB	2004	Celso Casagrande (Note: From January 1, 2005 to December 31, 2008.)
20		Vanderlei Antônio Moresco	January 1, 2005 – December 31, 2012	8 years	PMDB	2008	Clécio Roveda (Note: From January 1, 2009 to December 31, 2012.)
21		Neori Luiz Dalla Vecchia	January 1, 2013 – December 31, 2016	4 years	PP	2012	Evandro Santin Lazzari
22		Celso Casagrande	January 1, 2017 – October 6, 2019 (Note: Died in office.)	2 years, 278 days	PDT	2016	Madalena Gehlen Zanchin
23		Madalena Gehlen Zanchin	October 6, 2019 – December 31, 2020	1 year, 87 days	PP	—	Vacant
24		Francisco David Frighetto	January 1, 2021 – Incumbent	4 years, 145 days	PSL (Note: Until the party's merger on February 8, 2022.)	2020	Robledo Sanson Andreolli
24		Francisco David Frighetto	January 1, 2021 – Incumbent	4 years, 145 days	UNIÃO	2020	Robledo Sanson Andreolli
