= Christ the Protector =

Statue of Jesus in Encantado, Brazil

- Cristo Protetor (Portuguese)
- Artist: Genésio Gomes Moura, Markus Moura
- Completion date: April 22, 2022
- Subject: Jesus
- Dimensions: 43 m × 27 m (140 ft × 90 ft)
- Location: Encantado, Brazil; 29.23527695°S 51.91211208°W
- Website: https://cristoencantado.com.br/

Christ the Protector (Portuguese: Cristo Protetor) is a statue of Jesus Christ constructed in Encantado, Rio Grande do Sul, Brazil.

The statue was started in 2019, and completed on April 22, 2022, with a height of 43 m (140 ft) with its pedestal, making it the world's third tallest Jesus statue (after Christ Blessing and Christ the King, Świebodzin) and 5m taller than the Christ the Redeemer statue in Rio de Janeiro. Construction began in 2019 and was the idea of local mayor Adroaldo Conzatti, who died of COVID-19 in March 2021.

The Friends of Christ Association (AACristo) organization funded the $350,000 to build it from donations and also oversaw the construction of the statue. The venue will be open to the public sometime in 2023, said Robison Gonzatti, AACristo's vice president.

Though the surrounding tourist complex is still under construction, visitors can visit the statue up close during Saturdays, Sundays and Brazilian holidays as indicated in their website.

== See also ==
- List of statues of Jesus
