= Vespasiano Correa =

Municipality of Rio Grande do Sul, Brazil

- Municipality
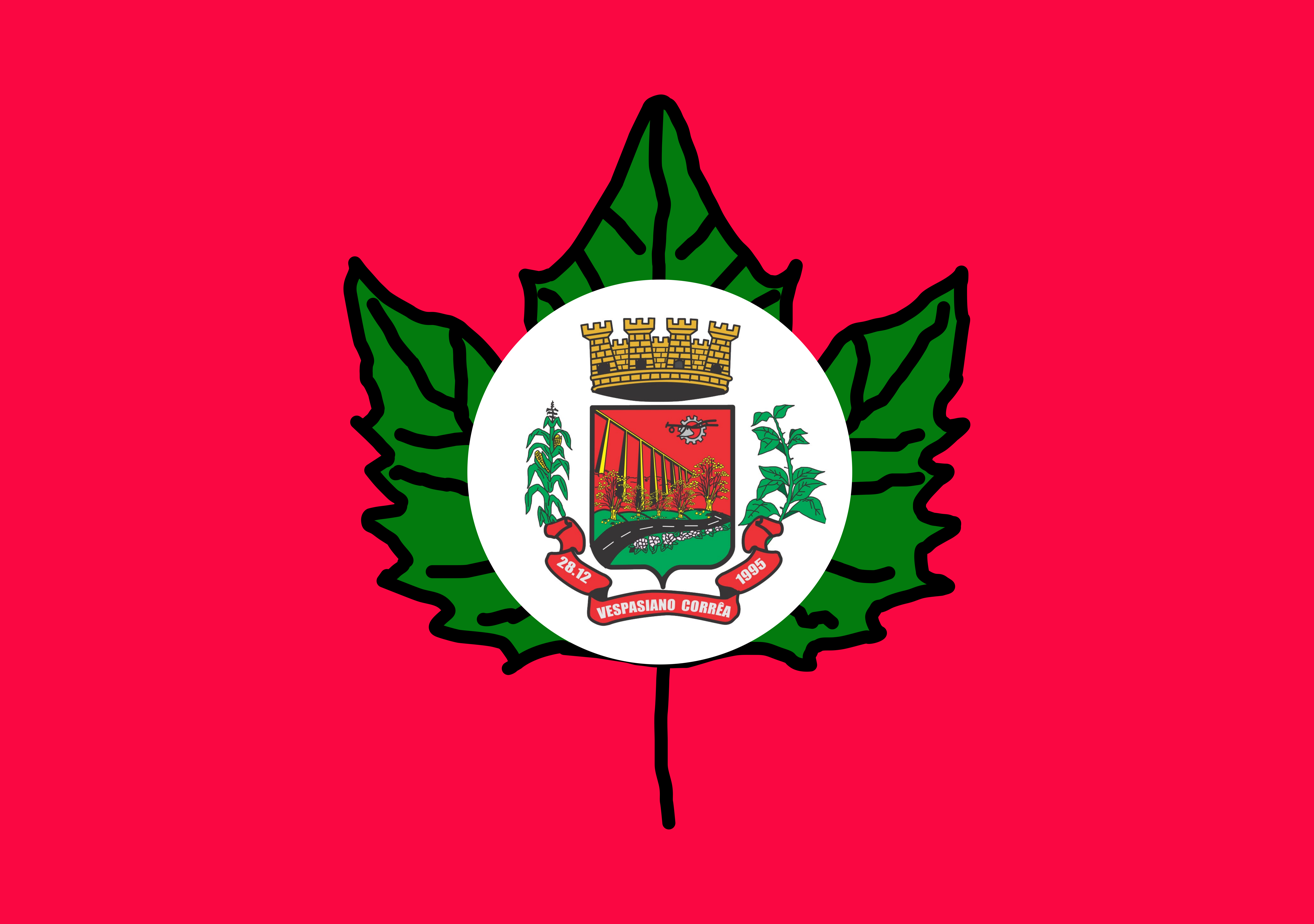
- Flag

- Location within Rio Grande do Sul

- Location in Brazil
- Coordinates: 29°04′S 51°52′W
- Country: Brazil
- State: Rio Grande do Sul

Population (2022)
  - Total: 1,818
- Time zone: UTC−3 (BRT)

Vespasiano Correa is a municipality in the state of Rio Grande do Sul, Brazil.

== See also ==
- List of municipalities in Rio Grande do Sul
