= Ilópolis =

Municipality of Rio Grande do Sul, Brazil

Coordinates: 28°56′S 52°07′W

- City
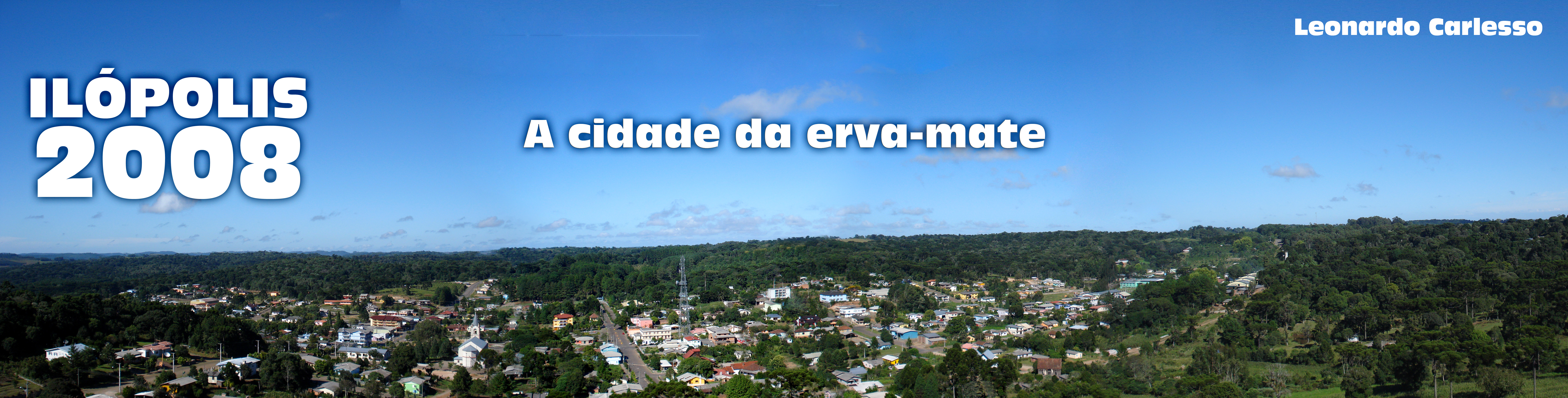

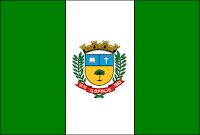
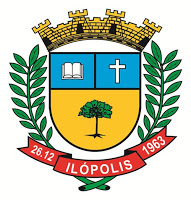
- Flag Coat of arms
- Nickname: "The Yerba Tea City"

Population (2022)
  - Total: 4,157
- Time zone: UTC−3 (BRT)
- ZIP code: 95990-000

Ilópolis is a municipality in the state of Rio Grande do Sul, Brazil.

== History ==
At the beginning of the twentieth century came the colony of Itapuca, founded by the Government of the State. In 1905 began on colonization of the current City of Ilópolis, with the arrival of immigrants. When in 1915, was the City of Encantado, their lands were included in the Districts of Itapuca and Anta Gorda. The opportunity arose with the construction of the road that linked the Encantado Soledade, in 1928. The fact is so striking that in 1931, the town of Ilópolis had already exceeded that of Itapuca, which is not located at the roadside. Seven years later, the Municipal Act number 3, January 10, 1938, becomes Ilópolis District seat, leaving only as Itapuca village.

Later it was recreated the District of Itapuca, reducing the area of Ilópolis but without harming its state of progress. After a consultation plebiscitária favourable, the District has been emancipated by Act 4687 of December 26, 1963. The name chosen was very happy because it is a city surrounded by beautiful vegetation. The words are of Greek origin, meaning the "city of forests." beautiful vegetacaipela law action for progress.

== Economy ==
Based on its economy in the cultivation, extraction and industrialization of yerba mate. Its name comes from "Ilex paraguariensis", added the "polis," that is "City of yerba-mate." It commemorates the day on December 26, anniversary of their emancipation.

== Tourism ==
Promotes every two years, the festival of Turismate. Currently, is in the final stages of construction in the city center, next to the former colonial Colognese mill, which was recently restored, the first museum dedicated to bread, in Brazil and the Americas, developed by architect Marcelo Ferraz.

== See also ==
- List of municipalities in Rio Grande do Sul

== How to get there ==
- Ilópolis on MAPSYOU
- Ilópolis'maps
