= Mansinam Island =

Island in Indonesia

Mansinam
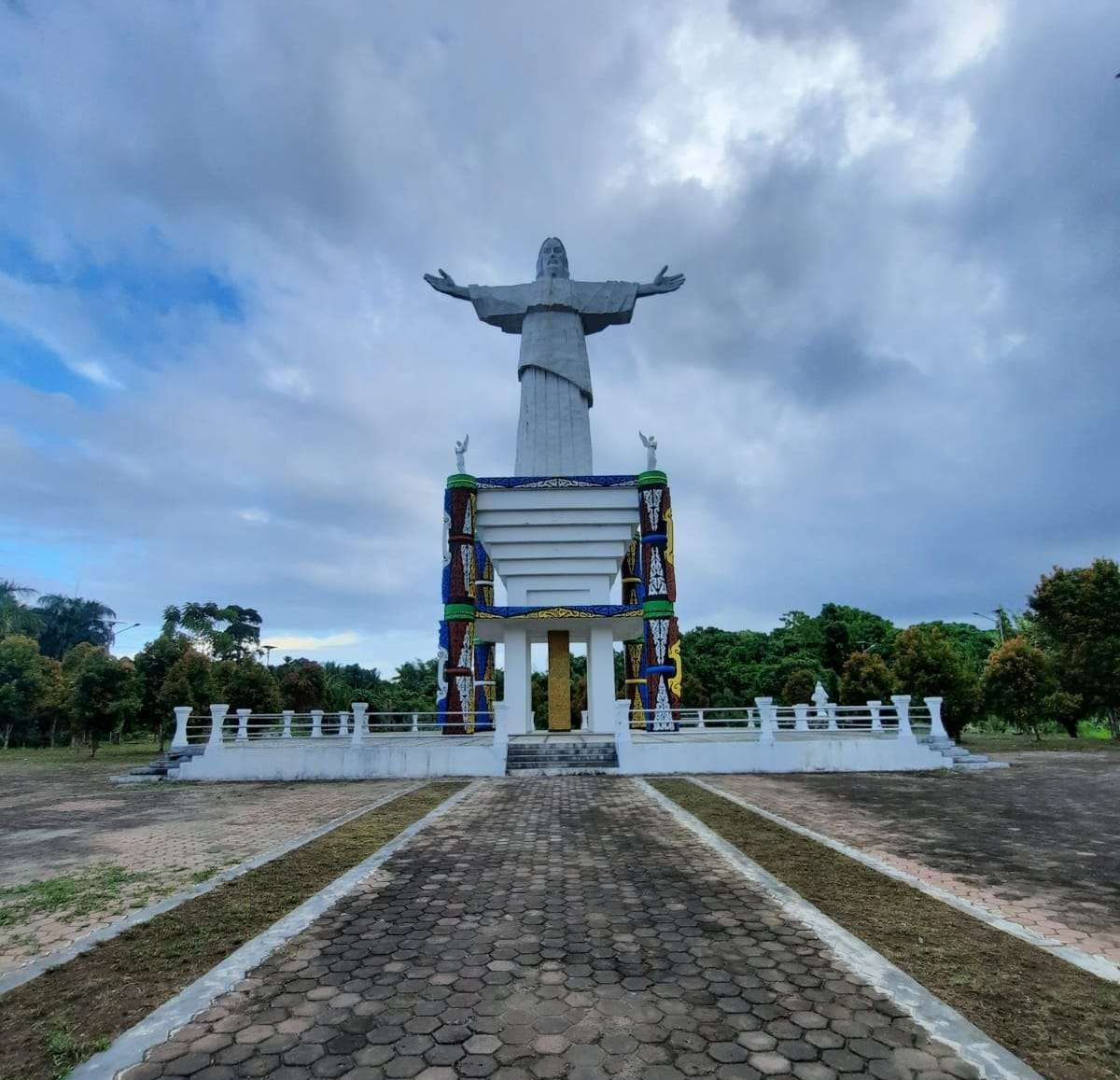
- Jesus statue in Mansinam

- Location within West Papua (province) Location within Indonesia

Geography
- Coordinates: 0°54′6.575″S 134°6′6.038″E

Administration
- Indonesia
- Province: West Papua
- Regency: Manokwari
- District: East Manokwari

Mansinam Island (Pulau Mansinam) is an Island in West Papua, Indonesia popular for religious tourism, especially for Christians due to its historical significance in the evangelisation of Papua. It is located 6 km from Manokwari city. To reach this island it is needed about 10–15 minutes by speed boat.
