= Encantado, Rio Grande do Sul =

Municipality of Rio Grande do Sul, Brazil

Encantado
- Municipality
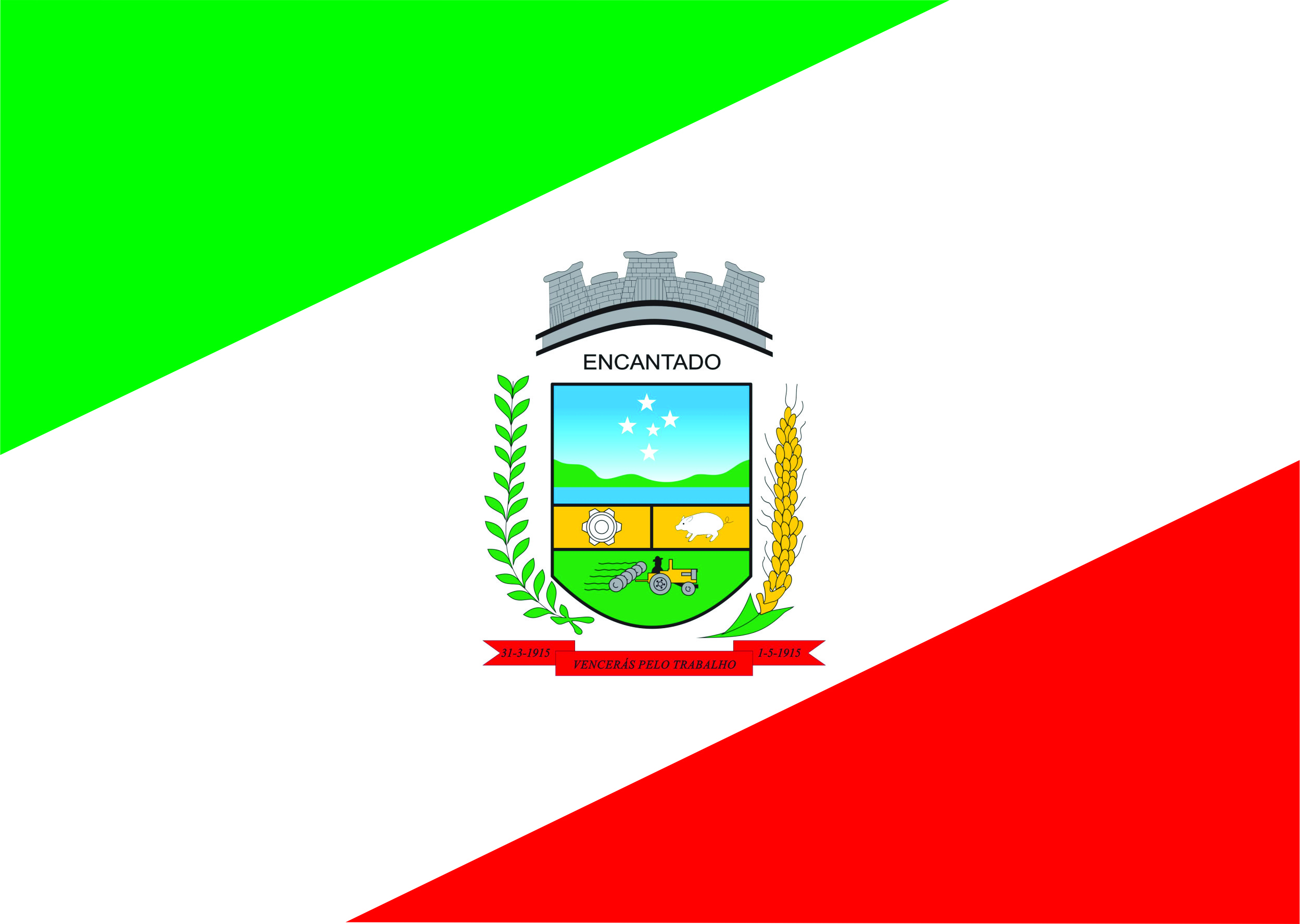
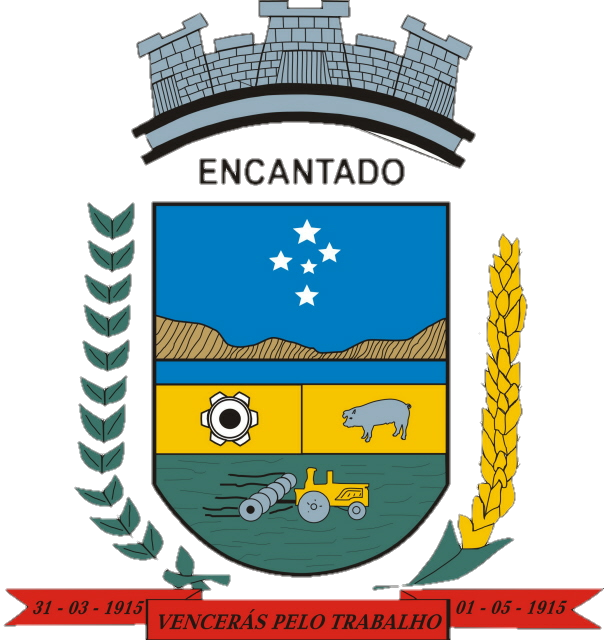
- Flag Coat of arms

- Location within Rio Grande do Sul

- Location in Brazil
- Coordinates: 29°14′09″S 51°52′12″W
- Country: Brazil
- State: Rio Grande do Sul

Government
  - Mayor: Jonas Calvi (2021-Present)

Population (2020)
  - Total: 22,880
- Demonym: Encantense
- Time zone: UTC−3 (BRT)
- Area/distance code: 51
- Website: https://encantado.rs.gov.br/

Encantado is a municipality in the state of Rio Grande do Sul, Brazil. It is located 25 km northeast of Teutônia. It is also the location of the Christ the Protector statue, which was completed in 2022.

Neighboring municipalities include Muçum, Roca Sales, and Vespasiano Corrêa.

== See also ==
- List of municipalities in Rio Grande do Sul
