= Christ of the Mercy =

Statue in San Juan del Sur, Nicaragua

Jesus of the Mercy
- Interactive map of Jesus of the Mercy
- Nearest city: San Juan del Sur, Nicaragua
- Coordinates: 11°15′43″N 85°52′54″W
- Established: Dedicated April 12, 2009

The Christ of the Mercy is a colossal statue of Jesus Christ in the city of San Juan del Sur, Nicaragua, to a height of 134m above sea level. The statue is located high above the northernmost seawall in the bay of San Juan. At the foot of the statue is a small chapel.

== See also ==
- List of statues of Jesus
- Monumento al Divino Salvador del Mundo, Monument to the Savior of the World San Salvador City, El Salvador
- Cristo Redentore, Christ the Redeemer of Maratea, Italy
- Christ of Vung Tau in Vietnam (32 m)
- Christ Blessing in Manado, North Sulawesi, Indonesia (30 m)
- Cristo-Rei in Portugal: a 28-metre-high (92 ft) monument of Christ the Redeemer
- Cristo Rei of Dili, a 27-metre-high (89 ft) statue in Dili, Timor-Leste
- Cerro del Cubilete in Guanajuato, Mexico: a 23-metre-high (75 ft) statue inspired by Christ the Redeemer
- Cristo Rey in Ejutla, Jalisco, inspired by the Rio de Janeiro statue
- Christ of the Ozarks in Arkansas, United States: a 20-metre-high (66 ft) statue inspired by Christ the Redeemer
- Christ of Havana in Havana, Cuba: a 20-metre-high (66 ft) statue inspired by Christ the Redeemer
- Christ the Redeemer of the Andes (Argentina/Chile)
- Cristo de la Concordia in Cochabamba, Bolivia
- Cristo de las Noas in Torreón, Mexico
- Christ of the Abyss in various underwater locations
