= Cristo Rey (Silao) =

Mexican statue

Coordinates: 21.012°N 101.369°W

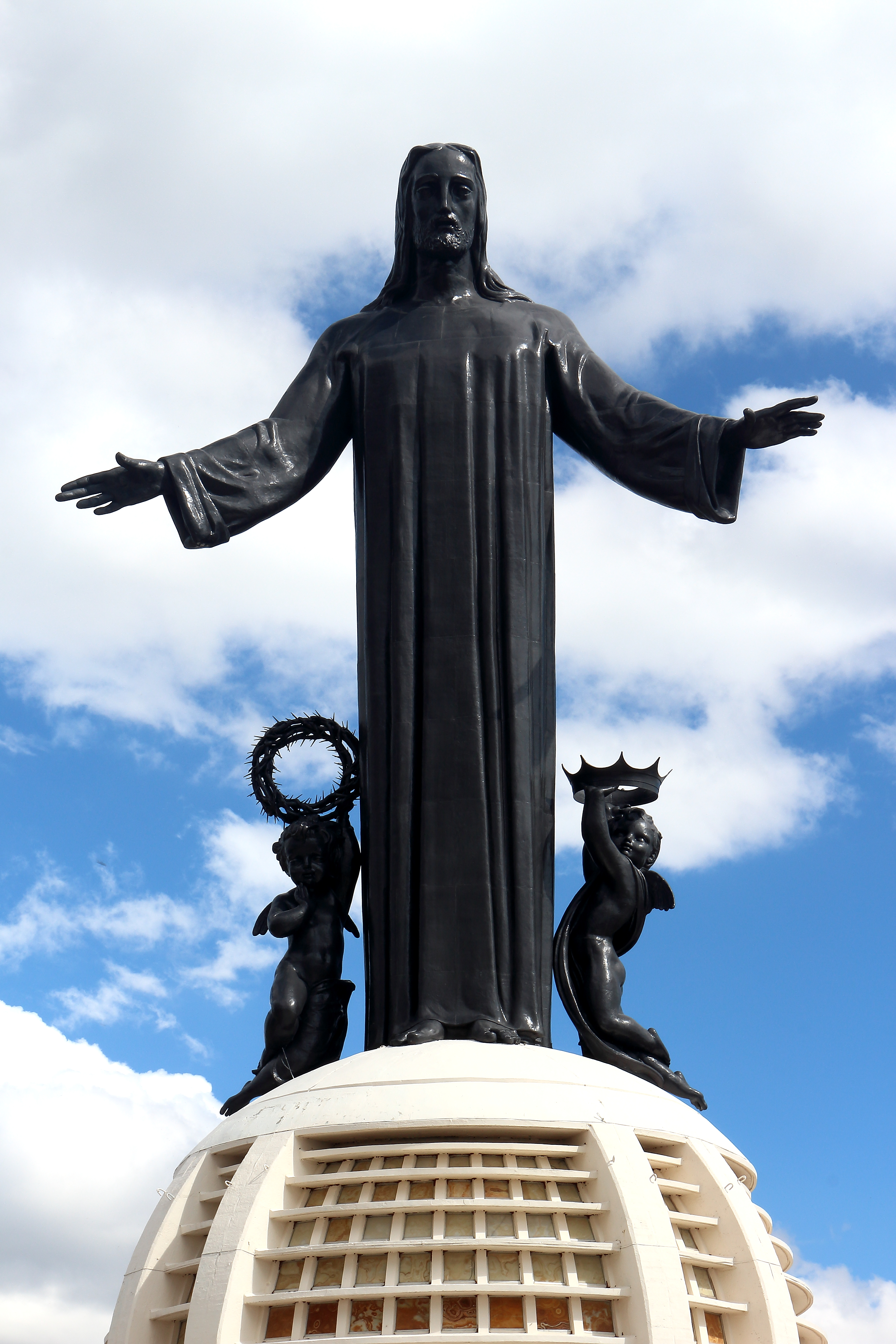
Church atop the Cerro del Cubilete

Cristo Rey is a statue on top of Cerro del Cubilete, ('Dice Cup Hill'), a 200 metres (660 ft) mountain in Silao Municipality in Guanajuato, Mexico.

== Description ==
Cerro del Cubilete is a religious shrine in Mexico that marks the country's geographical center. The current structure and base for the 23 metres (75 ft) statue were created by artist Nicholas Mariscal in 1944 to honour the struggle of the Cristeros. It is located 20 kilometers away from Silao and 30 kilometers away from León. It has a height of 2579 meters above sea level, 150 meters taller than the citadel of Machu Picchu in Peru.

The former Mexican President Vicente Fox states that the statue serves as a "rebuke to the suppressors of religious freedom" who sought to quash the Church during the persecution of Christians in Mexico during the first half of the twentieth century. The Sanctuary accommodates pilgrims who attend all year round, but in particular for the feast of Christ the King, the last Sunday of the liturgical year, during the month of November.

== History ==
In Silao, the bishop Valverde y Téllez was the promoter of the monument construction project and the petitioner for the authorization. This was achieved thanks to the remoteness of the moderate constituents of religious and governmental radicalism prevailing at that moment.

Shortly after Valverde's mass, the priest Eleuterio de María Santísima Ferrer promoted the placement of a commemorative plaque. The idea was consolidated to also add an image of the Sacred Heart. The project was accepted by the bishop, who attended the place on March 12, 1920, to lay the first stone and on April 11 to celebrate the first dedication.

The site was originally occupied by a smaller statue of Jesus, Christ the King. It was destroyed in 1928 by the anti-religious (and particularly anti-Catholic) regime of President Plutarco Elías Calles, as part of his mission to kill Christian rebels and destroy all Christian symbols during the nation's critical "Cristero War", when state atheism was enforced. The current installation was completed in 1950.

== Design ==
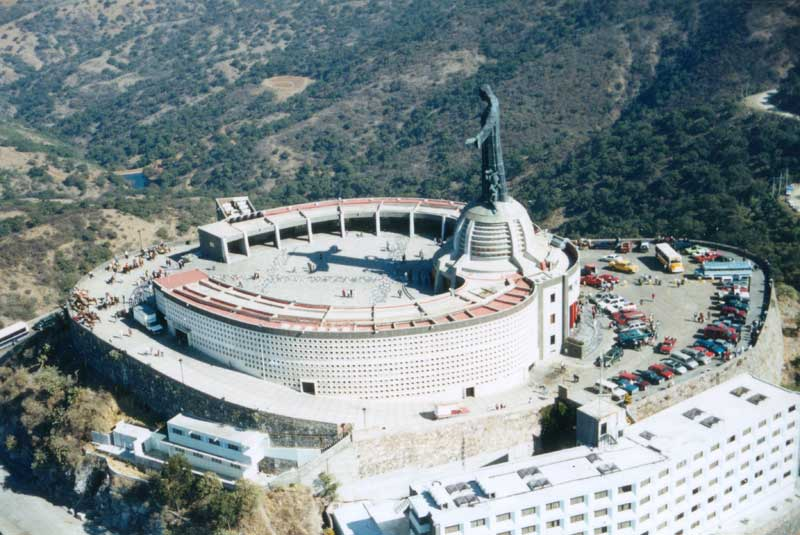
Monument to Christ on top of the hill

Both the building at Cerro del Cubilete and the statue of Christ follow the style known as art deco. The current building serves as the basis for the gigantic statue which measures 20 meters and weighs 80 tons. This statue of Christ is the biggest bronze statue in the world.

Inside, an altar sits on a circular platform with three steps. A symbolic royal crown was suspended in a large metal dome. Natural light filters through carved slots in the marble walls. The outside of the dome serves as the base of the newer statue, also named Christ the King. Its arms are open, with statues of angels kneeling at either side, one holding the crown of thorns, the other a royal crown.

At the foot of the statue of Christ the King is the modern basilica, shaped like a globe. One can also go by means of a cobbled road that surrounds the hill until you reach an upper roundabout, which functions as a viewing point.

== In popular culture ==
The sanctuary of Christ is one of the most visited in Mexico, after the Basilica of Our Lady of Guadalupe and the Cathedral Basilica of San Juan de los Lagos. José Alfredo Jiménez mentions Christ and the mountain in his song “Caminos de Guanajuato” (Roads of Guanajuato).

A mass is celebrated every January 5 in the churchyard, where thousands of riders usually go with their banners, representing their villages. Also, a representation is made of the Biblical Magi and the baby Jesus.

Every first Sunday of October, the monument to Christ the King is visited by thousands of pilgrims or faithful, coming mainly from the cities of León, Irapuato, Celaya, Mexico City; and the states of Michoacán, Jalisco, Aguascalientes, Querétaro, San Luis Potosí, Hidalgo, Zacatecas, Estado de México, Tlaxcala, Puebla, among others.

== See also ==
- List of statues of Jesus
- List of the tallest statues in Mexico
- Christ the King (Świebodzin)
- Cristo Rey (Colombian statue)
- Cristo de las Noas in Mexico
- Christ the Redeemer in Brazil
- Christ the King (Almada) in Portugal
- Cristo de la Concordia in Bolivia
- Christ of Havana
