= Cristo Rey (Colombian statue) =

Statue in Cali, Colombia

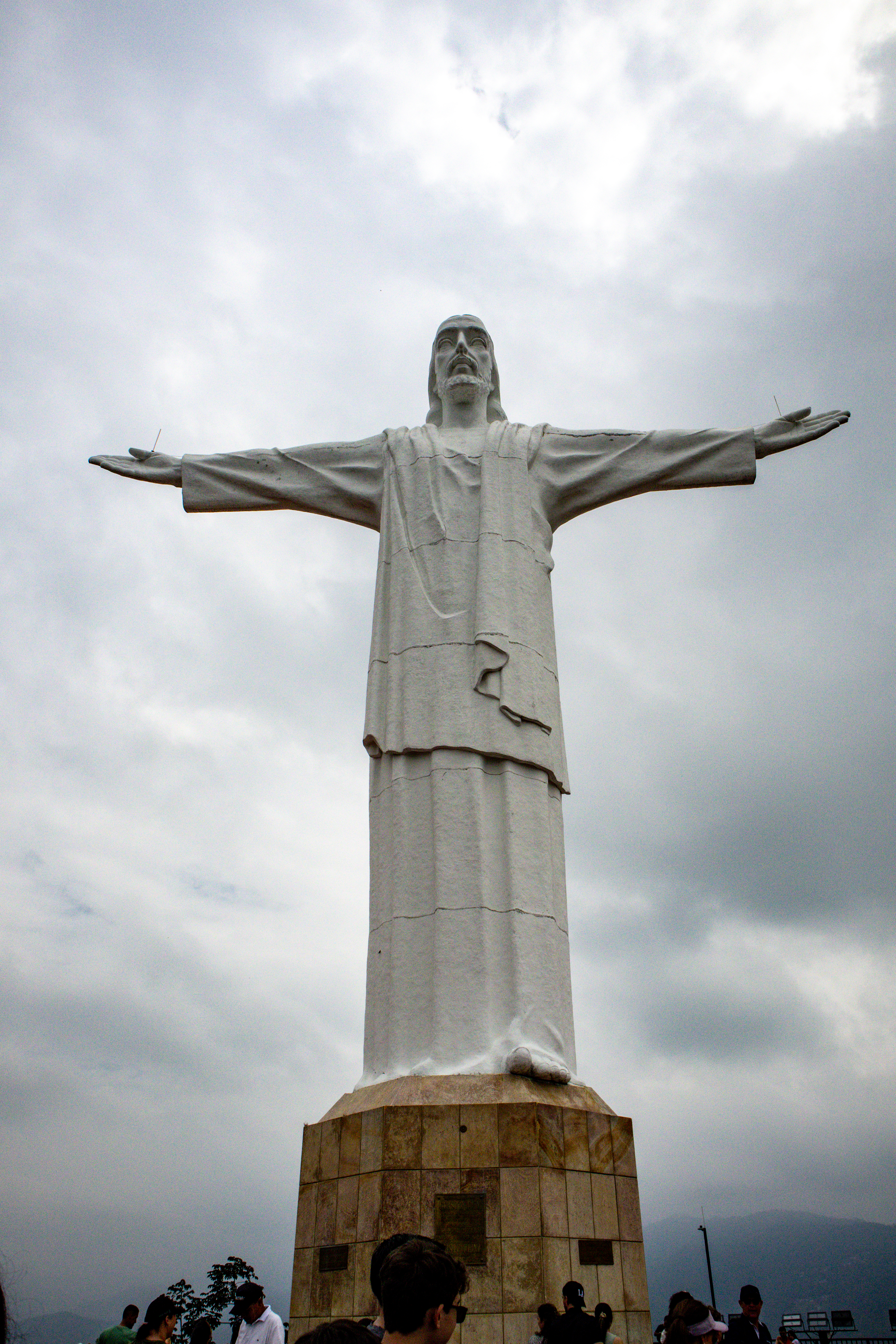
- Monument to Cristo Rey (Christ the King)
- Interactive map of Cristo Rey
- Location: Cali, Colombia
- Coordinates: 3°26′11.02″N 76°33′54.42″W
- Designer: Alideo Tazzioli Fontanini
- Height: 26 m (85 ft)
- Inauguration date: October, 25 1953

Cristo Rey (English: Christ the King) is a statue 26 meters tall located in the Cerro de los Cristales (Hill of the Crystals) in the village of Los Andes, west of the city of Cali, Valle del Cauca, Colombia. The hill is so named because of the large amount of quartz that could be collected in the surrounding area.

On Sunday, October 25, 1953, the statue was inaugurated at its summit an image of Christ in celebration of the fifty years following the end of the War of a Thousand Days. It is made of iron and concrete, with a mass of 464 tons and a height of 26 m, of which 5m belong to the pedestal.

== History ==
The Jesuit priest José María Arteaga had commissioned the Palmiran artist Gerardo Navia Carvajal to build the statue, but he only made a model before abandoning the project.

== Tourism ==
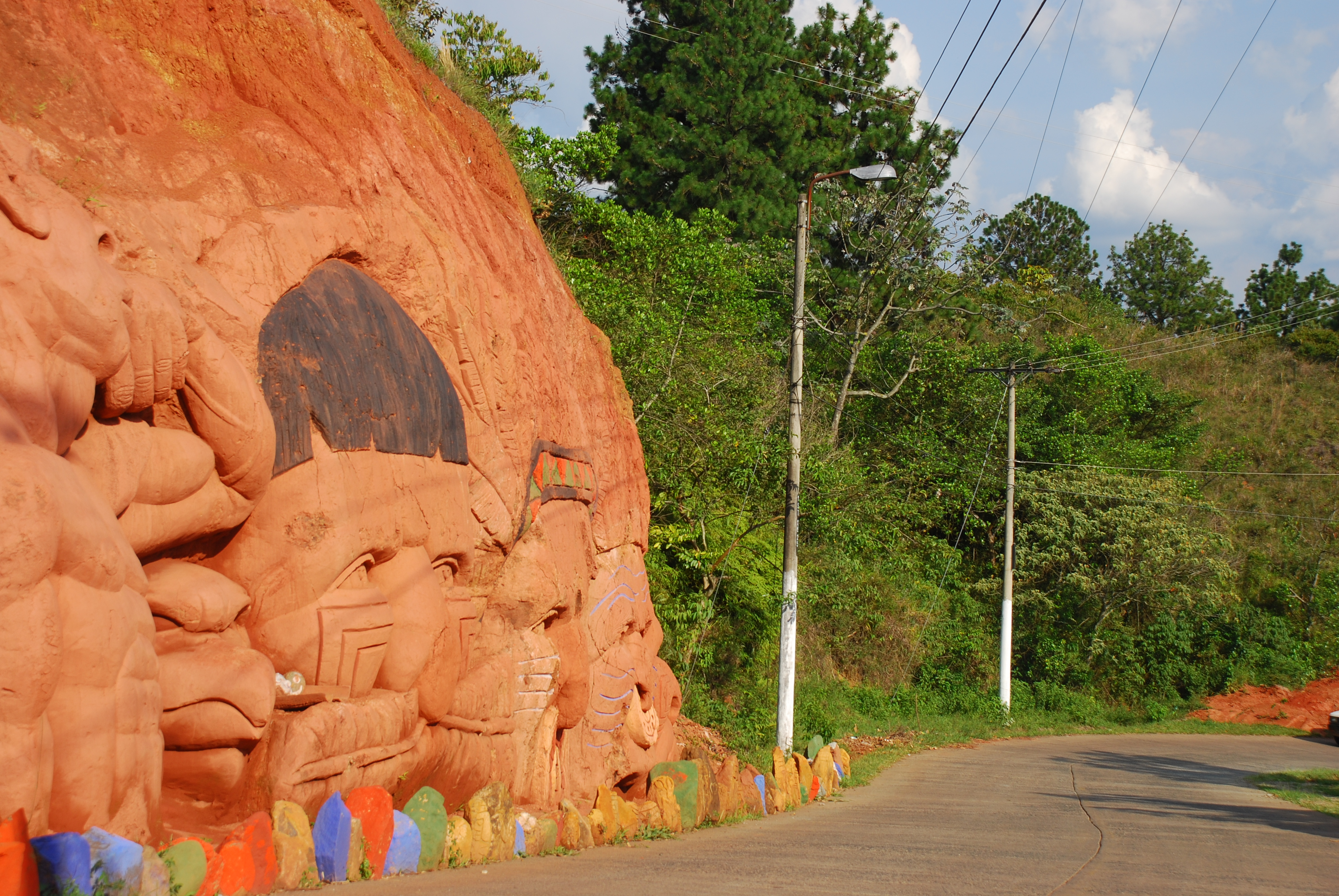
Work of Carlos Andrés Gómez, on the road to Cristo Rey.

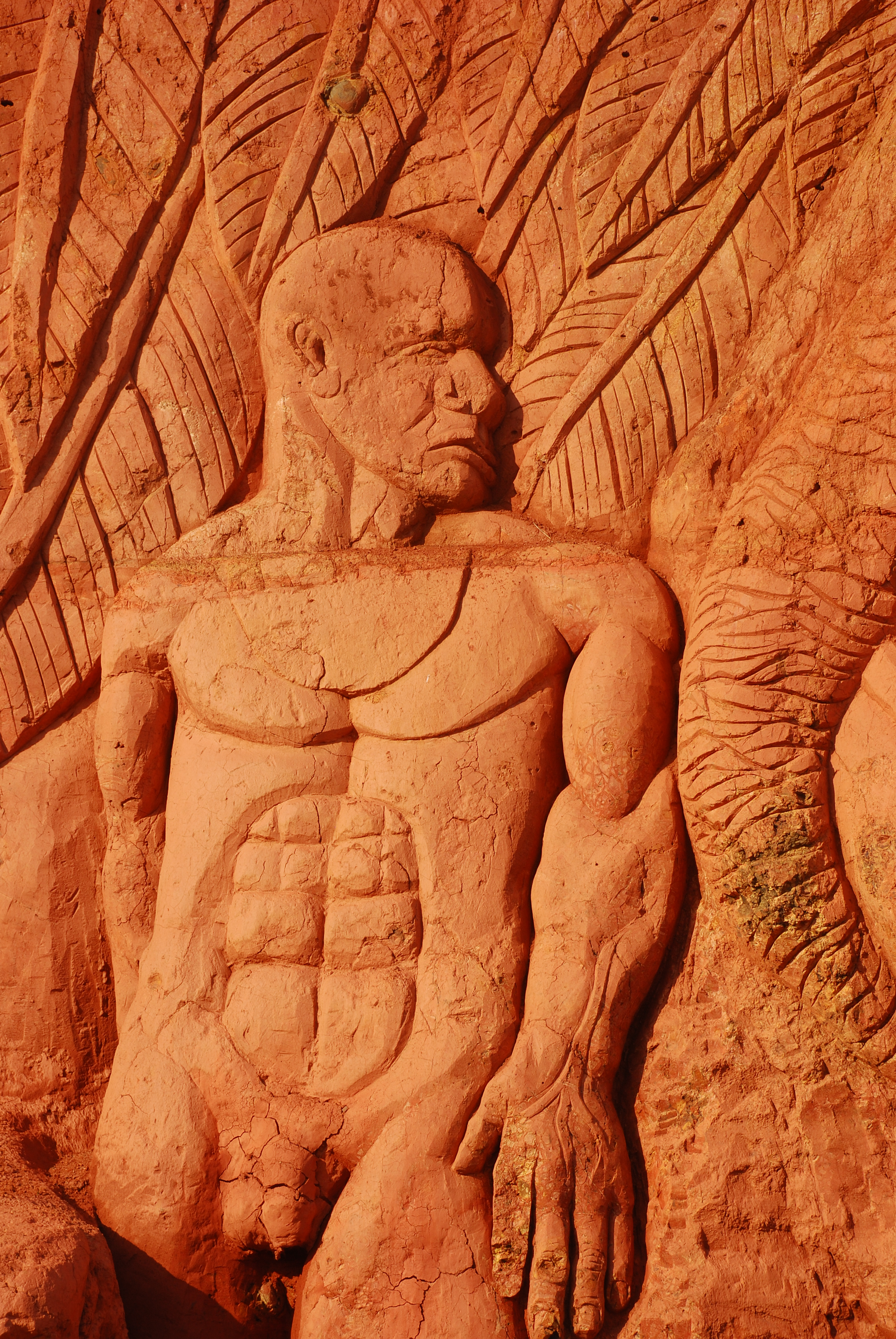
Barranquisimo

As people ascend the hill they can see the work of artist Carlos Andrés Gómez, who for two years sculpted his work on 34 ravines. This work is known as the biblical scenes of Golgotha. In the first canyon carved Existence, as a tribute to life and man; in the second, the Lament of the Pacha Mama, as a protest of nature for the damage that man has done to the environment; in the third gave life to Golgotha, to accompany the faithful make pilgrimage at Easter. In the fourth ravine is The Garden of Eden.

The figures modeled with cement and clay range from 50 centimeters to 5 meters high and extend over five kilometers.

The entrance to the monument of Christ the King is free. It is open from 8:00 am to 11:00 pm. There is a chapel, restaurant and parking, among other features.

Currently the sculpture is visited annually by 290,650 local and foreign tourists from the rest of Colombia and is one of the wonders of modern Colombia.

== See also ==
- List of statues of Jesus
- Christ the King (Almada) in Portugal
- Christ the Redeemer in Brazil
- Cristo Rey in Mexico
- Cristo de la Concordia in Bolivia
- Cristo de las Noas in Mexico
- Christ of Havana
