= List of statues of Jesus =

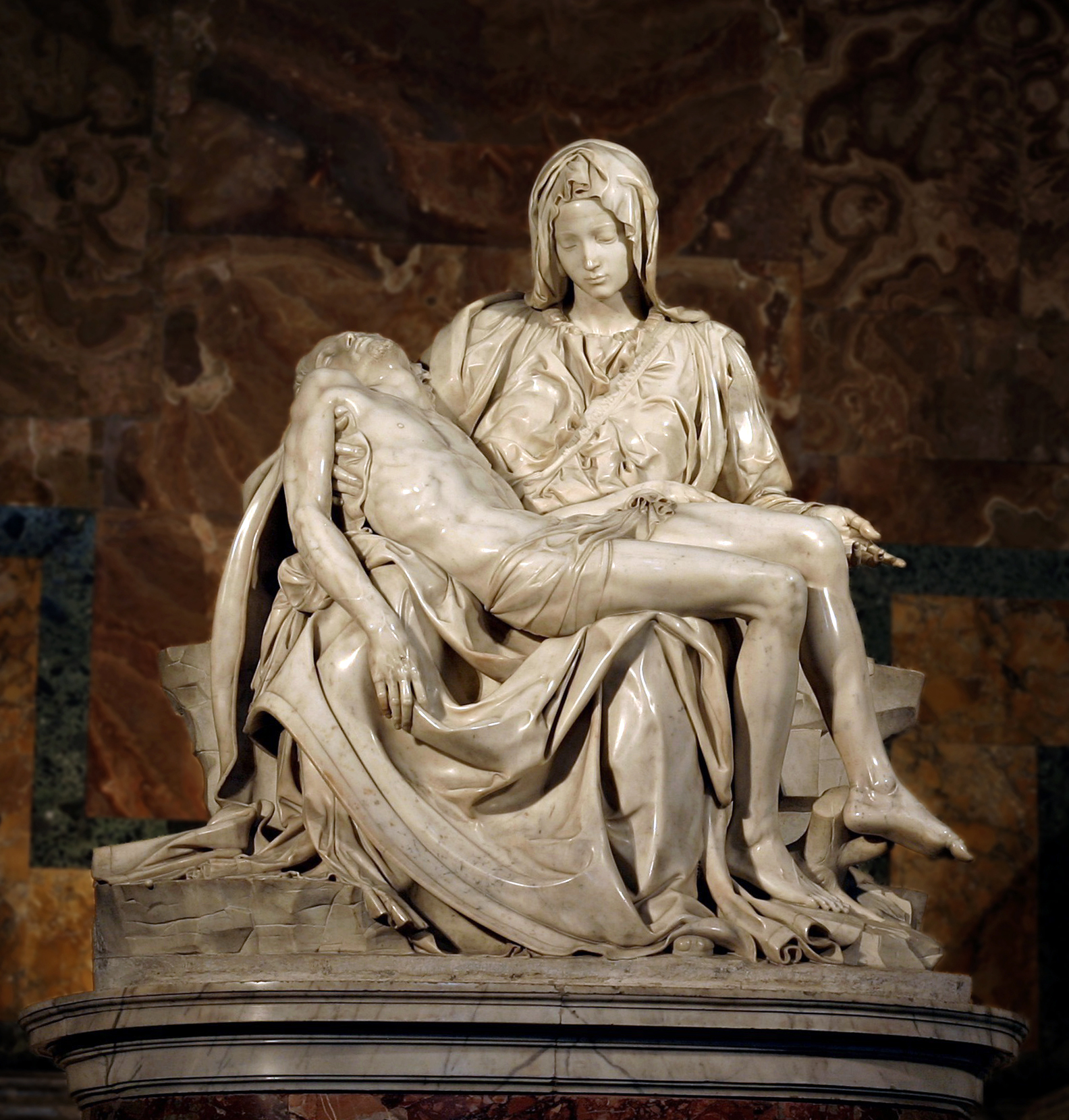
Pietà, Michelangelo, 1498–1499. St. Peter's Basilica, Vatican City

The following is an incomplete list of the more notable of the many statues of Jesus produced over the centuries.

Artistic depiction of Jesus in various forms date back to the early Christian period. However, it took several centuries for artists to reach a conventional standardised form for his physical appearance, which has remained largely stable since the early Middle Ages.

== Monumental ==
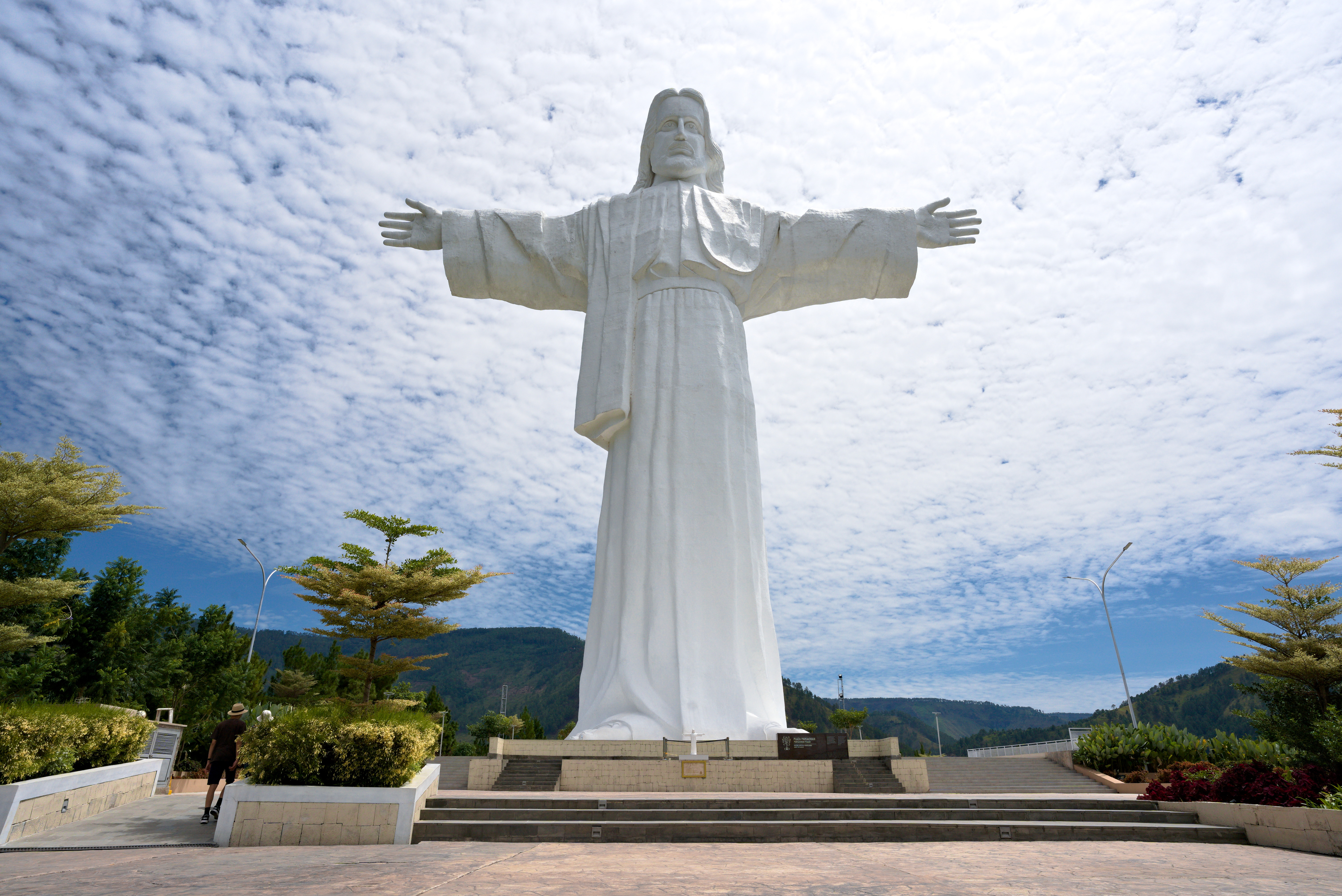
61-meter tall statue of Jesus Christ in Sibeabea, North Sumatra, Indonesia

- Jesus Blessed Sibea-bea or more often referred to as the Statue of Jesus in Sibea-bea, Samosir, North Sumatra, Indonesia, a statue monument with a height of 61 meters.

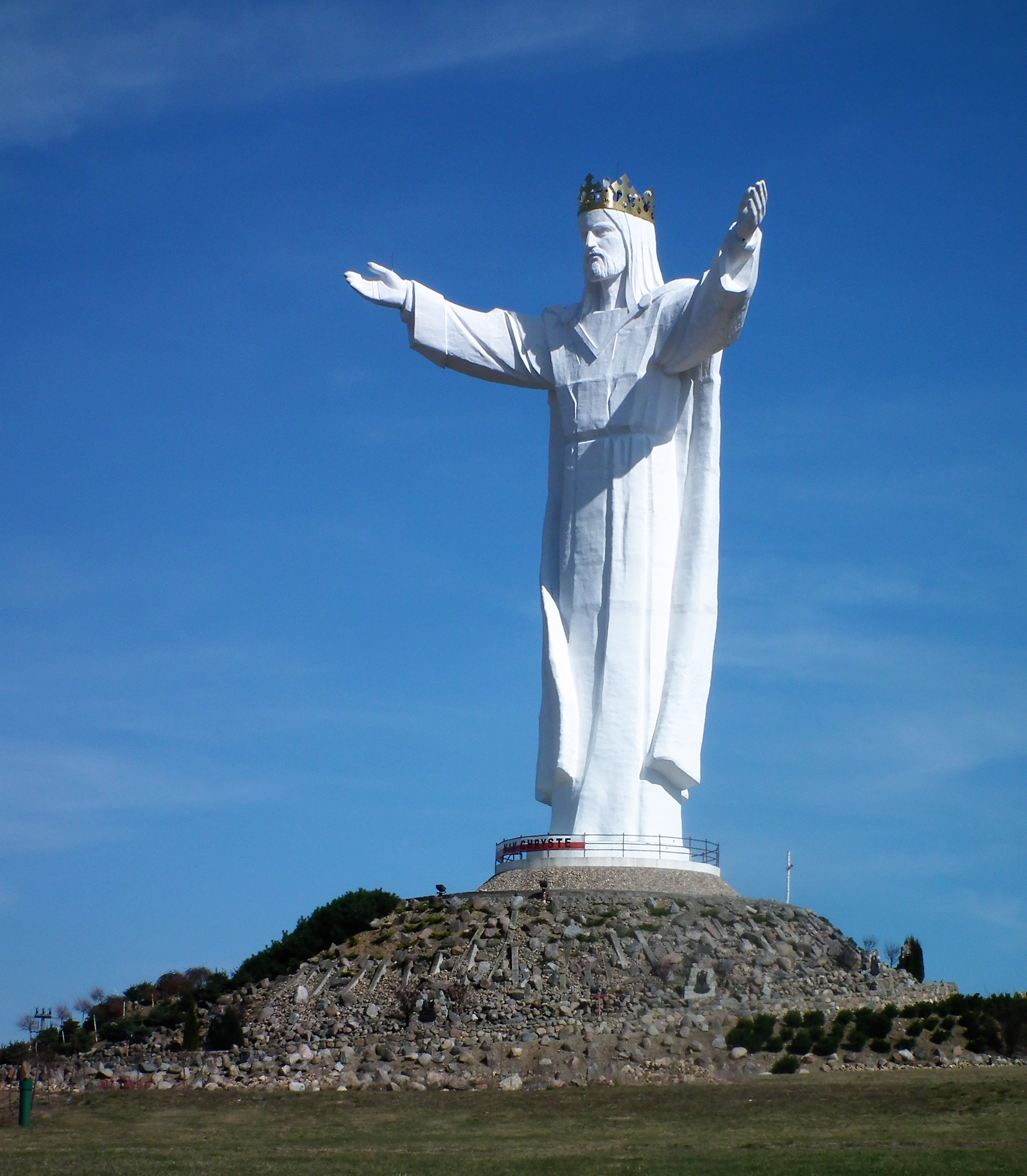
Christ the King in Poland

- Christ the King in Świebodzin, Poland.

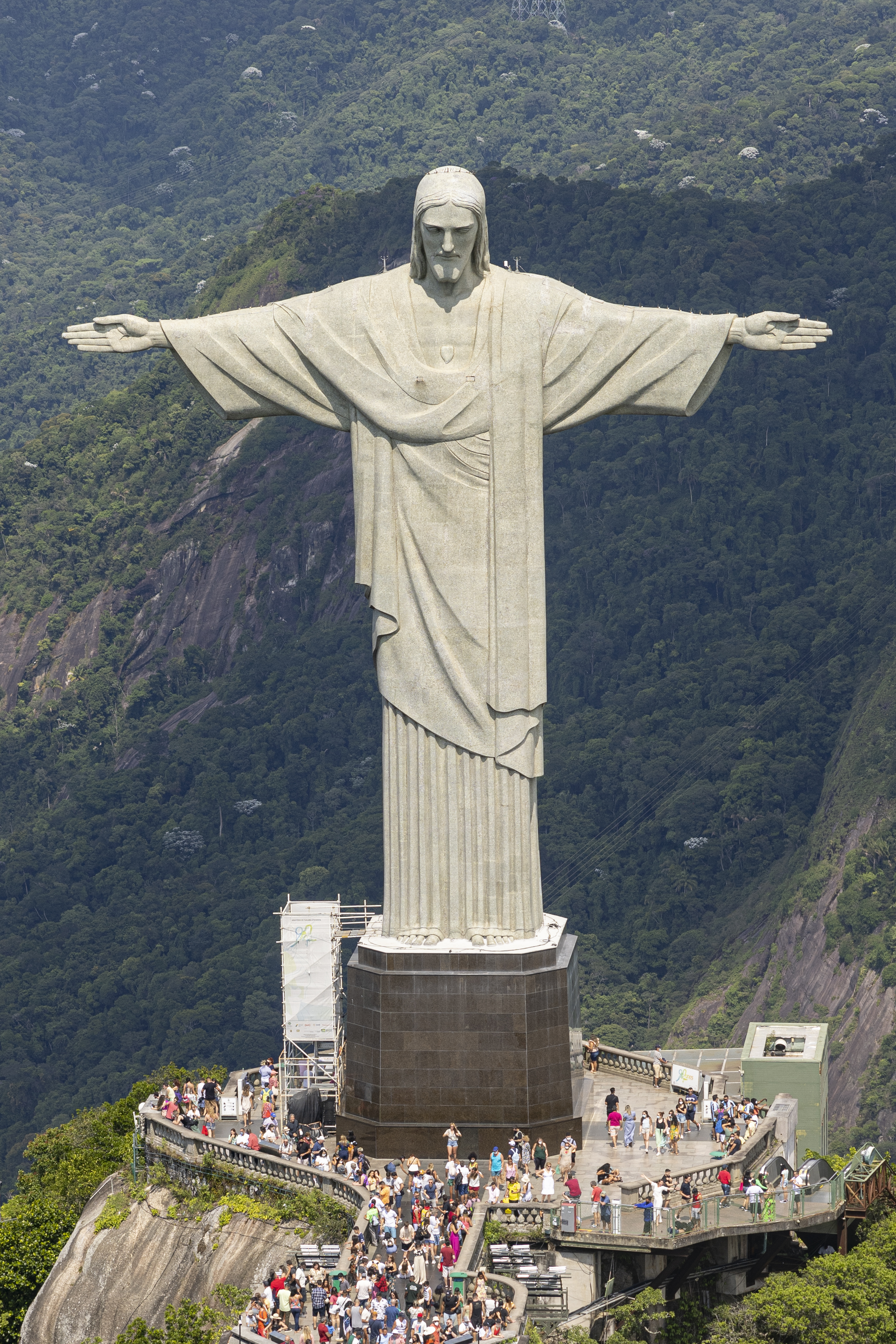
Christ the Redeemer, Rio de Janeiro, Brazil

- Christ the Redeemer in Rio de Janeiro, Brazil.

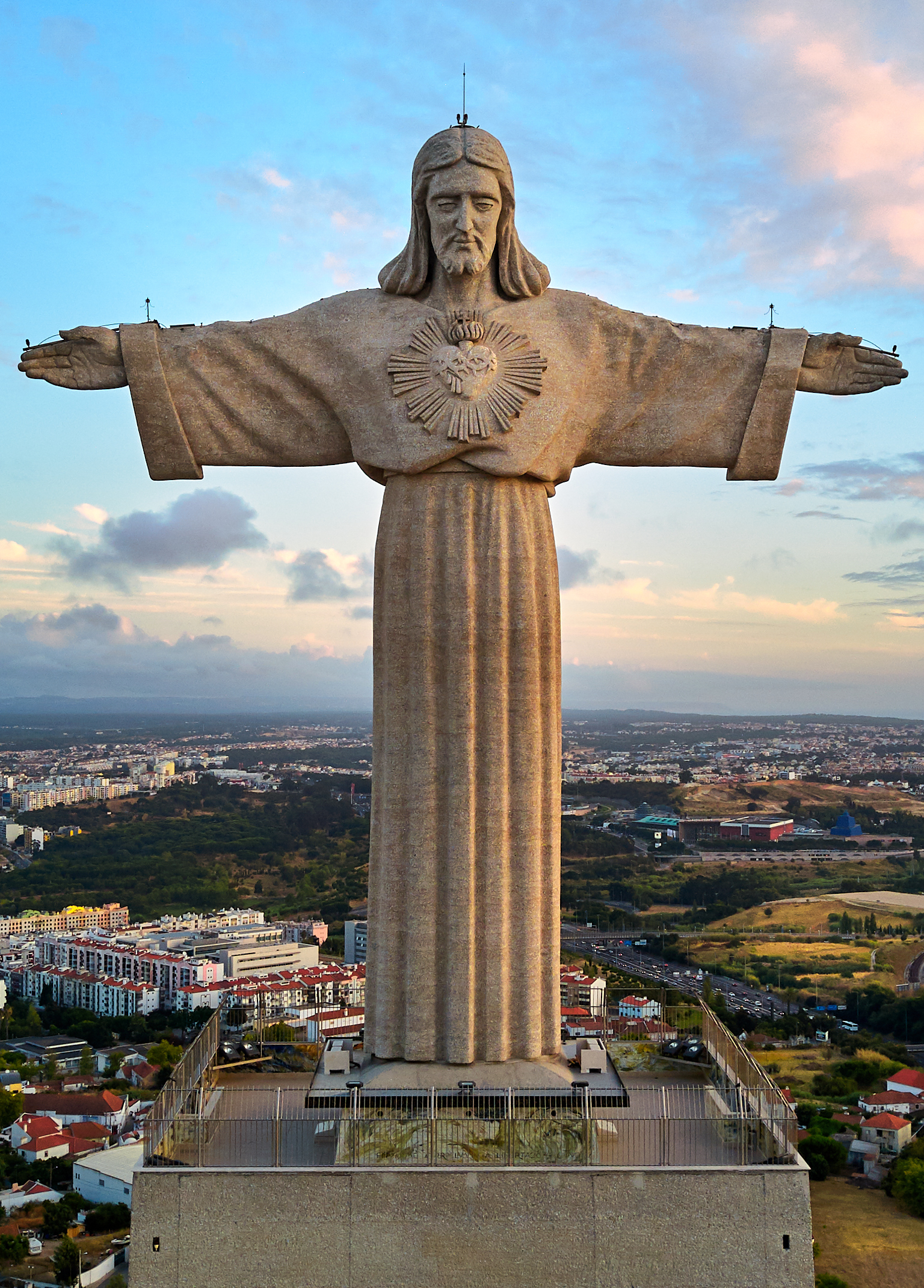
Christ the King in Lisbon, Portugal

- Christ the King is another very famous statue of the Sacred Heart of Jesus, located in Almada, overlooking the city of Lisbon, Portugal.
- Cerro del Cubilete in Guanajuato, Mexico
- Cerro de los Ángeles on a hill located in Getafe, Spain
- Christ at El Picacho in the north area of Tegucigalpa, capital of Honduras
- Christ Blessing in Manado, North Sulawesi, Indonesia
- Christ of Havana in Havana, Cuba
- Christ of the Abyss in various underwater locations
- Christ of the Mercy in the city of San Juan del Sur, Nicaragua
- Christ of the Ozarks in Arkansas, United States
- Christ of the Wichitas in Oklahoma, United States
- Christ of the Sacred Heart above the town of El Morro, near the city of Rosarito, Baja California, Mexico
- Christ of Vũng Tàu in Vung Tau city, Vietnam
- Le Christ Roi, Dog River, Matn District, Lebanon
- Christ the Redeemer of the Andes (Argentina/Chile)
- Cristo Blanco, atop Pukamuqu in the Cusco Region of Peru
- Cristo de la Concordia in Cochabamba, Bolivia
- Cristo de las Noas in Torreón, Mexico
- Cristo del Otero on the outskirts of the city of Palencia in Spain
- Cristo del Pacífico in Lima, Peru
- Cristo Ñu Pora, in Río Ceballos, Argentina
- Cristo Redentore Christ the Redeemer of Maratea, Italy
- Cristo Rei, Lubango in Lubango, Angola.
- Cristo Rei, Madeira in the Portuguese archipelago of Madeira
- Cristo Rei of Dili in Dili, Timor-Leste
- Cristo Rey (American statue) near Sunland Park, New Mexico, United States
- Cristo Rey (Colombian statue) in the village of Los Andes, west of the city of Cali, Valle del Cauca, Colombia
- Cristo Rey (Mexican statue) in Silao Municipality in Guanajuato, Mexico
- Divine Mercy Shrine (Misamis Oriental) in El Salvador, Misamis Oriental, Philippines
- Heart of Jesus (Foişorul "Inima lui Isus") near Lupeni, Harghita, Romania
- Jesus de Greatest in Abajah village in Imo State, Nigeria
- King of Kings (defunct) near Monroe, Ohio, in the United States
- Lux Mundi near Monroe, a replacement of King of Kings
- Monumento al Divino Salvador del Mundo in San Salvador City, El Salvador
- Risen Christ on top of Tombol Hill in Rosario, Batangas, Philippines
- Statue of Jesus in Mansinam Island, West Papua, Indonesia
- Sacred Heart of Jesus (Roxas, Capiz) in Roxas, Capiz in the Philippines
- Sagrat Cor de Jesus in Ibiza, Spain
- Statue of Jesus Christ, Ghosta, Lebanon
- Statue of Jesus in Saidnaya, Syria
- Statue of Jesus Christ on top of the Temple Expiatori del Sagrat Cor in Barcelona, Spain
- Statue of the Holy Son in Wolmyeongdong, South Korea
- Statue of Jesus Christ at Buntu Burake Hill, South Sulawesi, Indonesia
- Statue of Sacred Heart of Jesus in Merauke, South Papua, Indonesia

== Pietàs ==
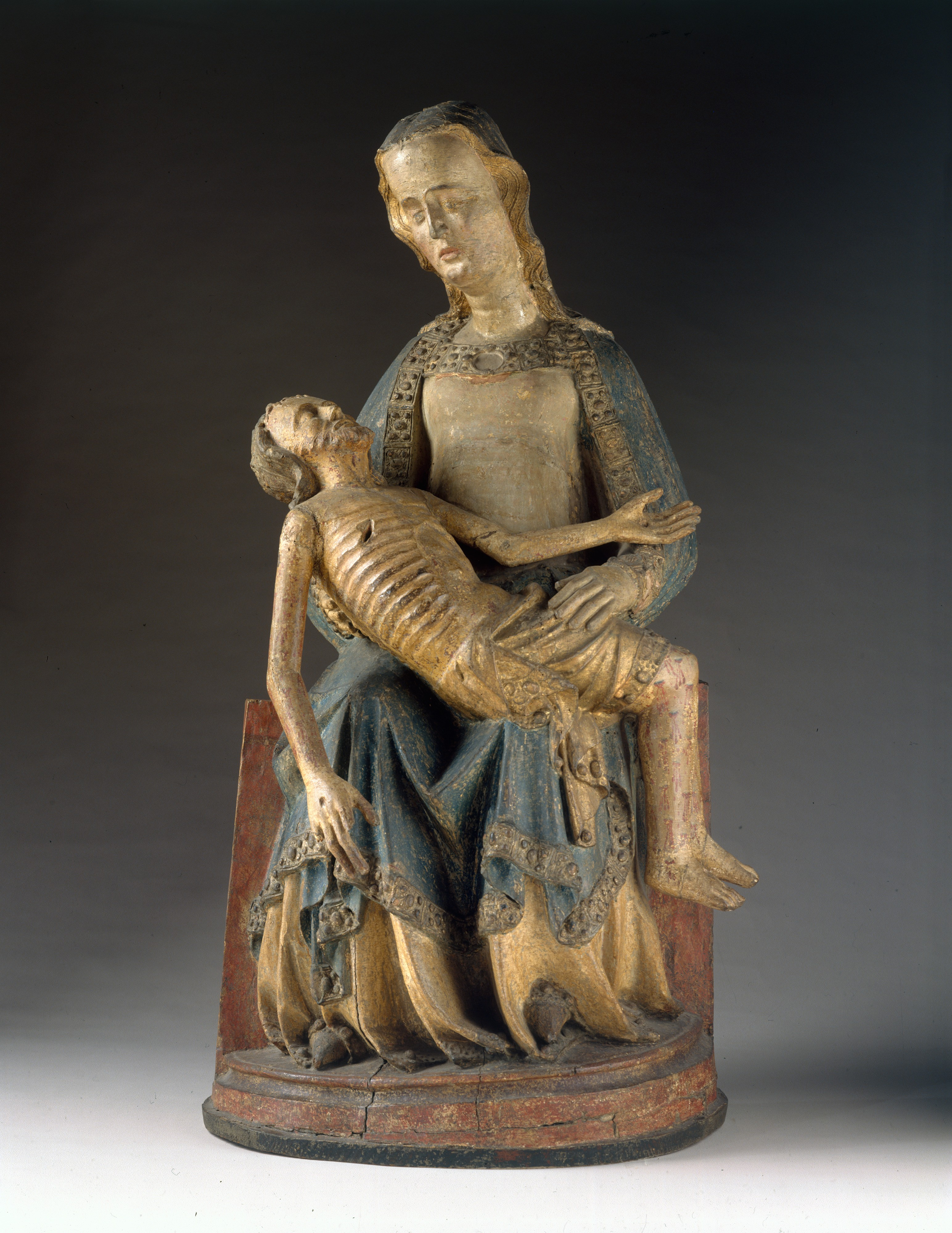
Pietà (Southern German, Cloisters), c. 1375–1400

Pietàs depict the Virgin Mary cradling in her lap or arms, the dead body of Jesus after his Descent from the Cross.

- Pietà, Southern German, c. 1375–1400, The Cloisters, NYC
- Pietà from Všeměřice, Czech, 1415
- Pietà, Italian, Michelangelo, 1498–1499
- Palestrina Pietà, formerly attributed to Michelangelo, c. 1555
- Rondanini Pietà, Michelangelo, completed 1564
- Pietà, Spanish, Gregorio Fernandez, 1616-1619
- Pietà, Spanish, Juan de Ávalos, 1952-1953, Valley of the Fallen Basilica, Madrid: the biggest Pietà in the world (6 x 12m).

== Others ==
- Bambino Gesu of Arenzano, 1902
- Batlló Majesty, Catalonia, 12th-century, Romanesque
- Black Nazarene, Philippines, 1606
- Chocolate Jesus, Australia, Richard Manderson, 1991
- Christ and St. Thomas, Andrea del Verrocchio, 1467–1483
- Christ of the Abyss, Italian, 1954
- Christ of the Lanterns, Spanish, Juan Navarro Leó, 1794
- Christ of the Ohio, US, 1954
- Christus Indianapolis
- Christus, Danish, 1833
- Corpus, Gian Lorenzo Bernini, 1650
- Cristo de La Laguna, Canary Islands, 1510-1514
- Cristo de Tacoronte
- Cristo della Minerva (Risen Christ), 1521, Rome
- Cristo Negro, Portobelo
- Crucifix (Michelangelo)
- The Dead Christ, Irish, John Hogan, 1829
- The Deposition, Michelangelo, 1547 to 1555
- Divino Niño, 20th-century, Bogotá
- Fisherman's Memorial (Palacios, Texas)
- Gero Cross, c. 965–970, now in Cologne Cathedral, Germany
- Holy Face of Lucca
- Holy Infant of Good Health
- Homeless Jesus, Timothy Schmalz, 2013
- Infant Jesus of Mechelen
- Infant Jesus of Prague, 16th-century
- Kristu tal-Baħħara
- Lamentation over the Dead Christ, Donatello, c. 1455-1460
- Monumento al Divino Salvador del Mundo
- Nazareno de Achaguas
- Niño Dios (Child Jesus images in Mexico)
- Niñopa, Mexico
- The Parable
- The Resurrection (Fazzini)
- Rood of Grace, English, Tudor era?
- Sacred Heart of Jesus (Indianapolis)
- Sagrat Cor de Jesus
- Santo Bambino of Aracoeli
- Holy Infant of Atocha
- Santo Niño de Cebú
- Santo Niño de Tondo
- Santo Niño de Arévalo
- Señor de las Tribulaciones
- Señor de los Temblores
- The Servant Christ, American, Jimilu Mason, 1986
- Veiled Christ, Giuseppe Sanmartino, 1753
- Virgin and Child from the Sainte-Chapelle
- Well of Moses, Claus Sluter, 1395–1403

== See also ==
- Depiction of Jesus
- Life of Christ in art
