= Christus (Indianapolis) =

Statue in Indianapolis, Indiana

- Year: ca. 1960
- Medium: Marble
- Dimensions: 174 cm × 85 cm × 30 cm (68.4 in × 33.6 in × 12 in)
- Location: Indianapolis, United States; 39°55′48″N 86°3′45″W
- Owner: Oaklawn Memorial Gardens

Christus is a public artwork by an unknown artist located in Oaklawn Memorial Gardens in Indianapolis, Indiana in the United States.

== Description ==
The work is made of marble and stands at 5 feet 7 inches (1.70 m). Built around 1960, it depicts Jesus Christ standing and wearing a robe and mantle. His head is bowed slightly and his eyes are closed. His arms are stretched in front of him with the palms of his hands facing upwards towards the sky. It stands upon a base made of brick and stone.

== Condition ==
The piece was surveyed in 1993 by Save Outdoor Sculpture!. It was described as being "well maintained."

== See also ==
- List of statues of Jesus
