= Christ at El Picacho =

Monument in Tegucigalpa, Honduras

- Cristo de "El Picacho"
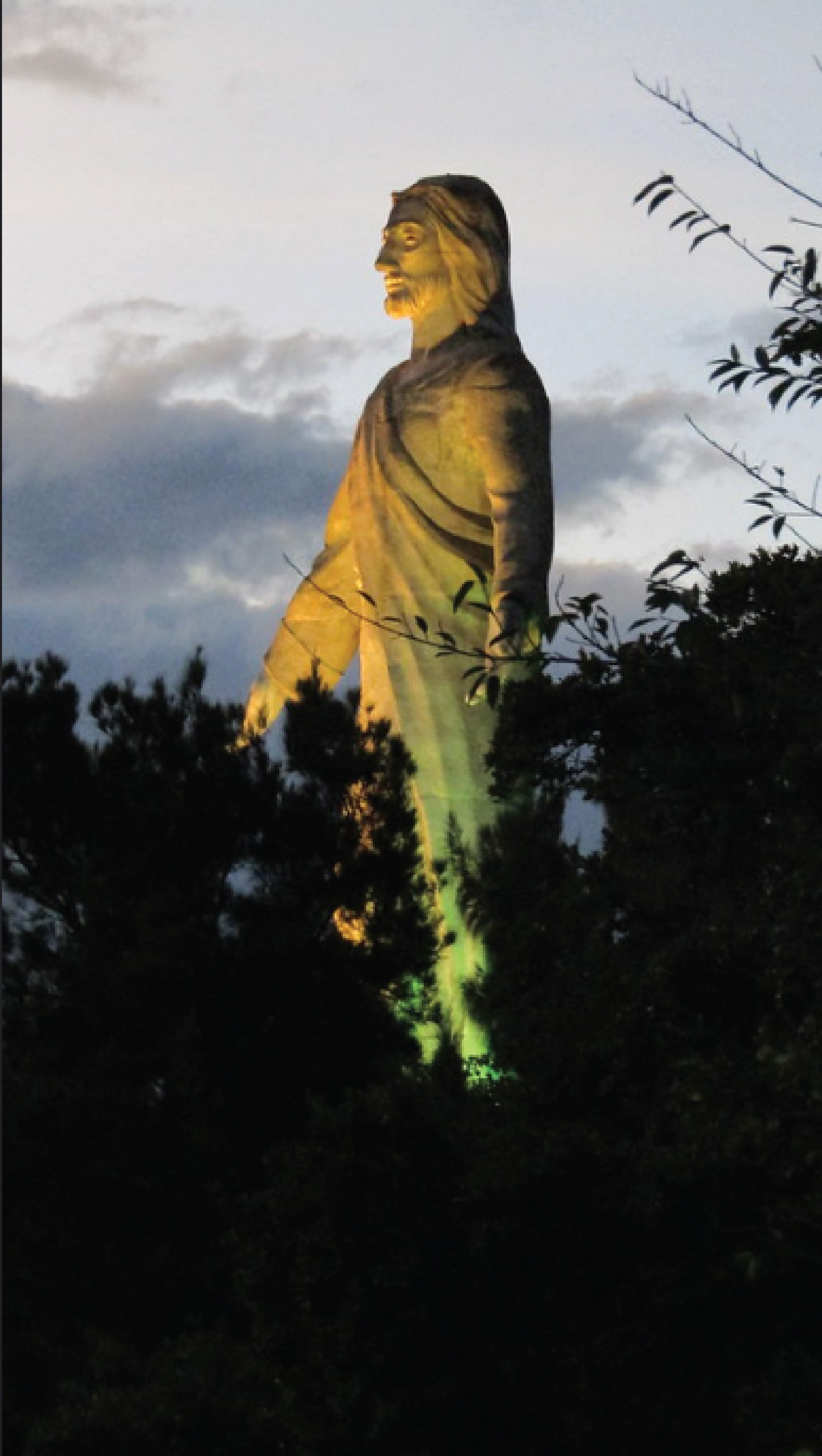

General information
- Location: Tegucigalpa, Honduras
- Elevation: 4,353 feet
- Construction started: 1997
- Completed: 1998
- Cost: $ 220,000
- Owner: Christ at El Picacho Foundation

Design and construction
- Architect: Luciano Duron
- Awards: 30 Wonders of Honduras

Website
- www.cristodelpicacho.org

The Christ at "El Picacho" is a monument which stands on the hill El Picacho in the north area of Tegucigalpa, capital of Honduras, at a height of 4,353 feet above sea level.

== History ==
In 1997, during preparations for the celebration of the 2000 Jubilee Year, Archbishop Oscar Andres Rodriguez dedicated the commemoration of the Lord Jesus Christ, at that time, in which he stated his desire to build a monument. To achieve its objective a commission headed by Armida of Lopez Contreras and complemented by key members of Honduran society, who after long deliberations and consultations with the permission of the Bishop Rodríguez, agreed to build an image of Christ of large dimensions.

Initially and after a close analysis -since the work needed to begin soon- two locations were chosen, the first to the highest in the Cerro El Picacho, the most prominent and representative natural accident in the capital of Honduras, from where everyone can see the city at its best, however inconvenient were found since the space was occupied by an important water distribution facility in town.

He also thought about the possibility to locate embedded in another important hill that closes like a Southern part of the city, "The Berrinche" Hill, which was, however, discarded because its projection would be limited to the historical and nearby downtown area.

Therefore, it was decided to resume but at a lower altitude, about 30 meters below and 300 meters away from the highest point of El Picacho, a special place in the strip occupied by the Park of the United Nations and bordering the same hill. Precisely the point that occupied an old sundial (built in the forties, who recalled an ancient Mayan symbol) which then served as a lookout, with the approval of Archbishop Oscar Andres Rodriguez, the city was chosen.

For the work it was necessary to invest a large sum of money. The Honduran people, many government and private entities contributed enthusiastically and in a short time is achieved collect the approximate amount of 5 million lempiras. The artist Mario Zamora resident in Mexico was hired, the committee requested him three sketches, which were presented to the then Monsignor Rodriguez, from which the image of the Resurrected Jesus was chosen.

== Description ==
The Christ is a sculpture of 2,500 tons and 98 feet in total height (an image of 65 feet high on a pedestal of 33 feet). Its opening was on January 16, 1997. The massive Christ rises on the west side of Cerro El Picacho, and can be seen from far away by at least sixty percent of the population of the Central District, especially at night. The reinforced concrete religious figure was artfully designed by the prestigious Honduran sculptor Mario Zamora Alcantara residing in Mexico for several years. The Design and Construction of the building in its share of Structural Engineering was conducted by the construction company CONSULCRETO, led by Engineer Jose Francisco Paredes and architectural design of the park was designed by Arch. Luciano Duron. The artist prepared a giant fiberglass mold in the Mexican capital, which is then melted into El Picacho on a concrete base also ten meters high. The construction hard work seven months a team of 40 people.

== Construction stages ==
1st Phase (Stage I and Stage II) Year 1997

- Monument, terraces and gardens to the south

2nd Phase (Stage III) Year 1998-2005

- Walls and towers north
- Terraces and gardens # 3 and # 4
- Bardas walls and closing the West
- Exterior trail - Terrace # 2

3rd Phase (Stages IV and V) Year 2007

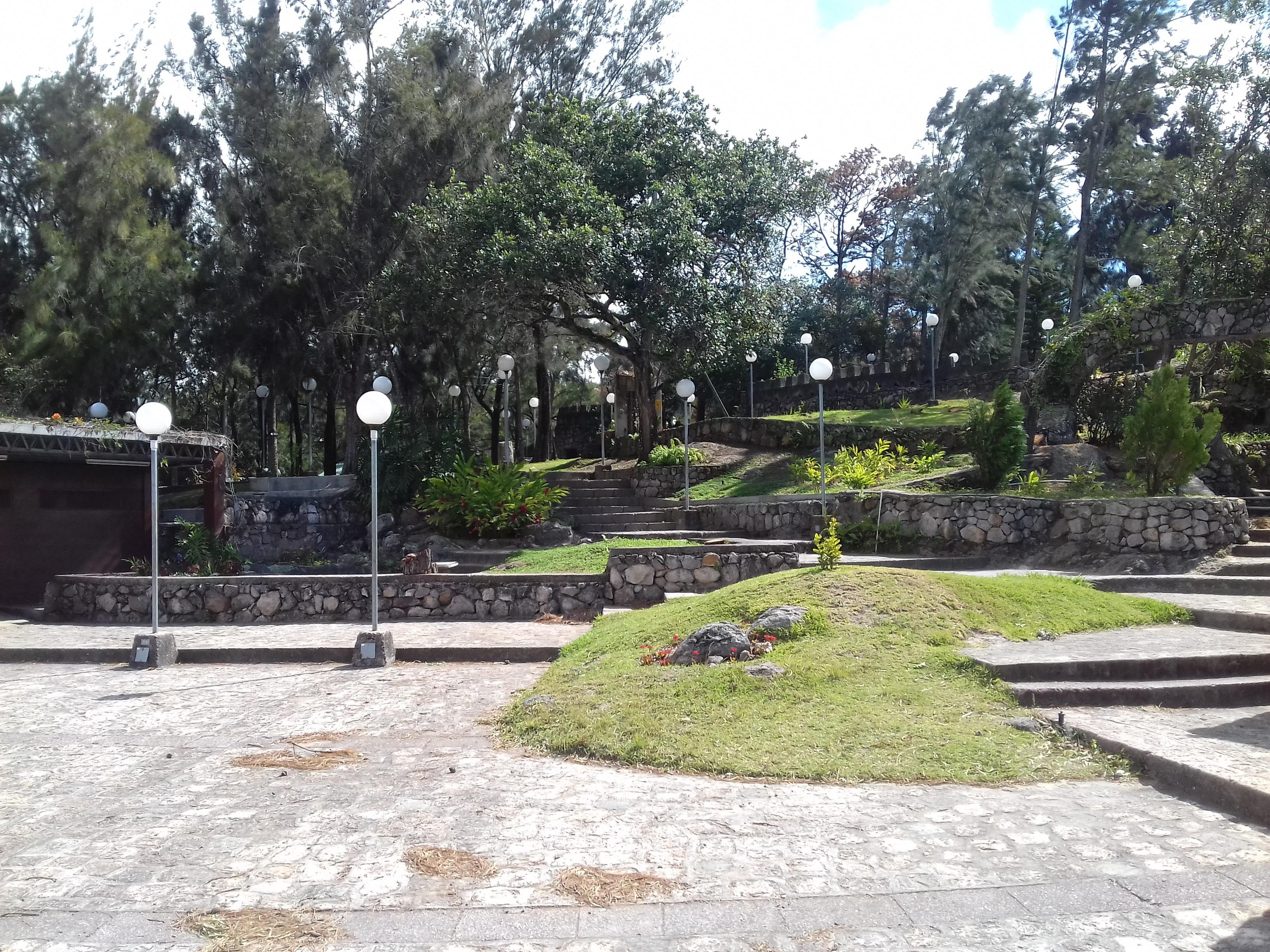
Ceremonial plaza at the Monument area

- Access to Ceremonial Plaza (West)
- Health Module - Treatment Plant
- Completion Central Sector (Square High - Bleachers) (I)
- Tower # 2 and stands (Cave of Christ)

4th Phase (Stage VI) 2008-2009

- Ceremonial Square enlargement
- Handicapped ramp
- 5 Commercial stores
- Terraces, paths, flower beds
- Lighting

5th Phase (Stage VII) Year 2010 Improvement trail north Amphitheatre in the northern part

== See also ==
- List of statues of Jesus
