= Sagrat Cor de Jesus =

Monument in Ibiza, Spain

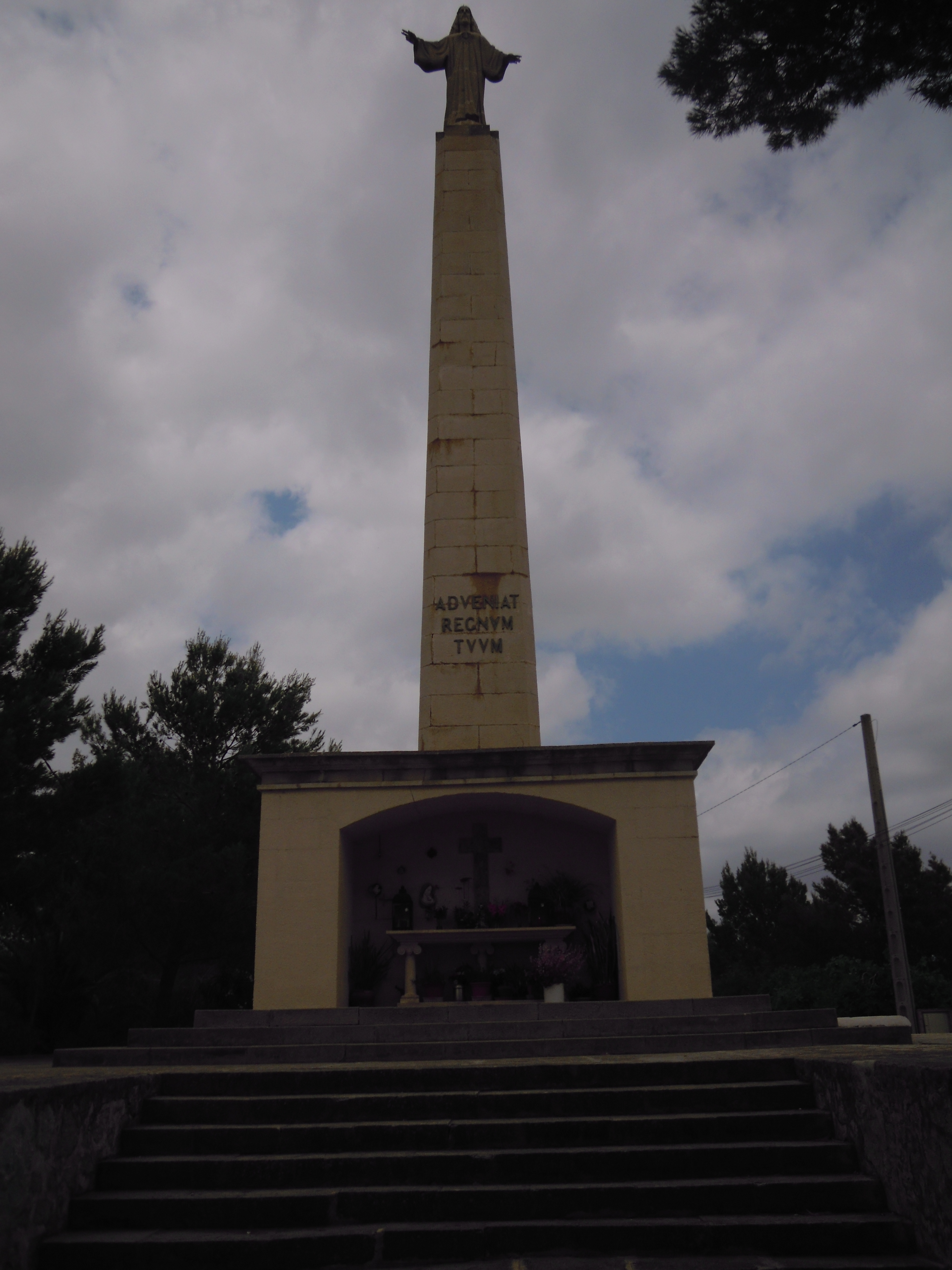
- The statue of Sagrat Cor de Jesus
- Interactive map of Sagrat Cor de Jesus
- Location: Ibiza Town, Balearic Islands, Spain
- Coordinates: 38°56′28.32″N 1°25′20.26″E
- Designer: Valencian sculptor Antoni Sanjuan
- Completion date: 12 October 1947

Sagrat Cor de Jesus (Christ, the Sacred Heart of Jesus) is a monument located 3.5 miles (5.6 km) north of Ibiza Town on the Spanish island of Ibiza.

== Description ==
The monument is built from stone and is 23 meters tall. The base pedestal and the pillar were constructed by a construction company from the island of Majorca by the name of Joan Serra. The onsite construction was carried out under the supervision of Joan Costa, master builder from Ibiza. The design structure and detail was carried out by architect Guillermo Moragues. The statue of Christ was carved by the Valencian sculptor Antoni Sanjuan. This statue of Christ resembles the famous statue of Christ the Redeemer on the Corcovado mountain outside the Brazilian city of Rio de Janeiro. The Ibizan statue is 14 meters shorter than its Brazilian cousin.

== History ==
This memorial was completed on 12 October 1947 and was constructed at the instruction of Antonio Cardona Riera who was the Bishop of Ibiza between 2 February 1950 to 28 March 1960. The memorial and Christ statue was constructed to commemorate and to give thanks to the local population for giving sanctuary and a place of hiding to Antonio Cardona Riera, known on the island as Frit, during the Spanish Civil War. The late summer of 1936 saw a period of time during the conflict when Ibiza churches had become a target of hate and were set alight and priests were being killed. Following the military rebellion on Ibiza by the Nationalist the island had been re-captured by the Republicans under the leadership of Alberto Bayo. When Bayo left the island for Majorca, the FAI (Iberian Anarchist Federation) were left in control and it was during this period that Cardona decided to go into hiding for several days in these hills and was able to survive with the help of the local population.

== Location ==
This memorial statue is to be found on a small knoll north of Ibiza town on the eastern side of the EI-600 road which runs from Ibiza Town to Sant Antoni de Portmany. It is in the small hamlet named Monte Cristo as is the nearby industrial estate.

=== Getting there ===
The memorial site is not easy to find. By car travelling from Ibiza town, take the main EI-600 road to Sant Antoni then, after two miles, take a right road eastwards towards the industrial zone after the large supermarket. Keep driving straight ahead and uphill. After a short distance turn right again along a small lane to the car park just below the monument.

=== Gallery ===
Sagrat Cor de Jesus

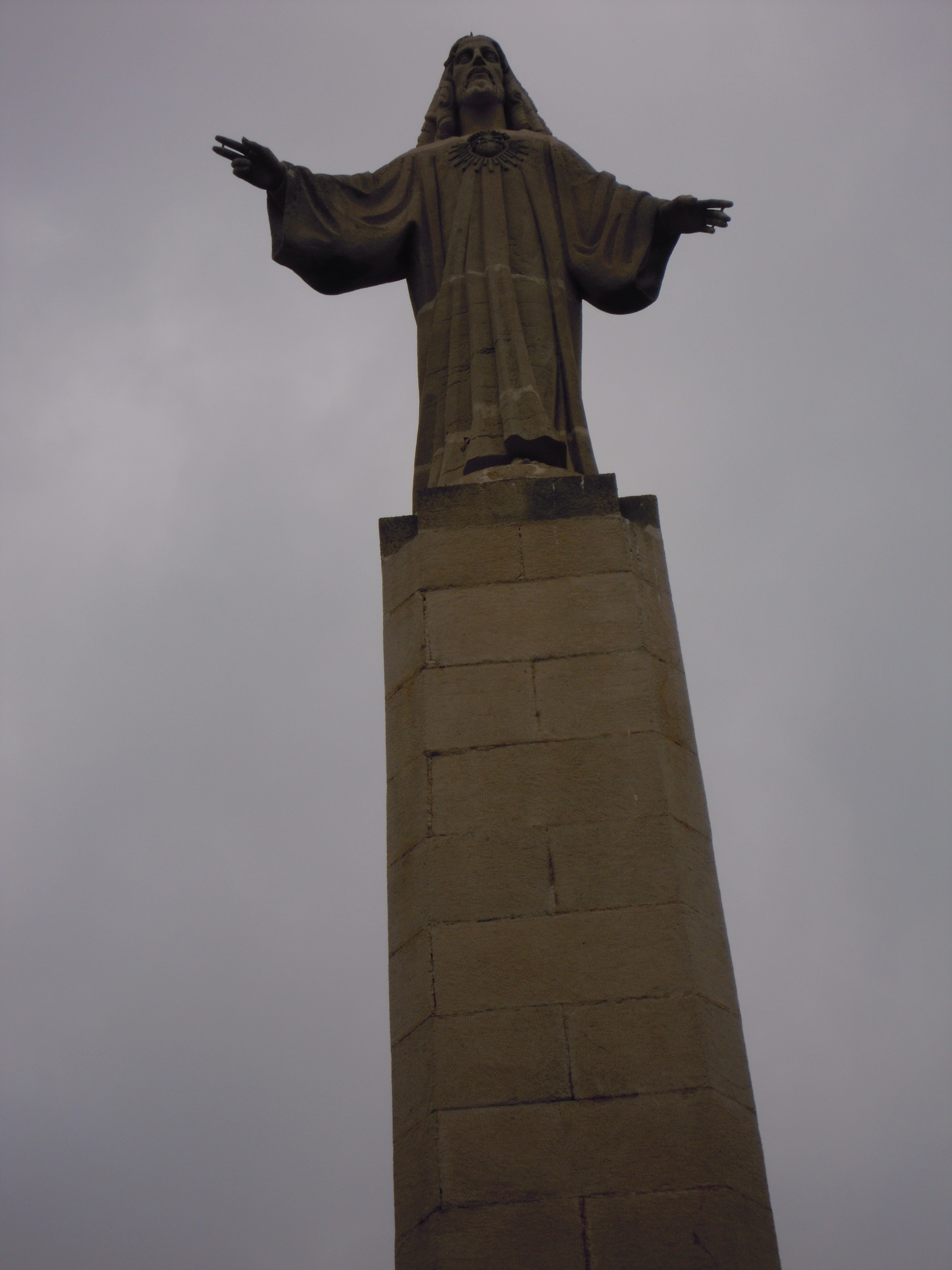
The statue of Christ, carved by sculptor Antoni Sanjuan

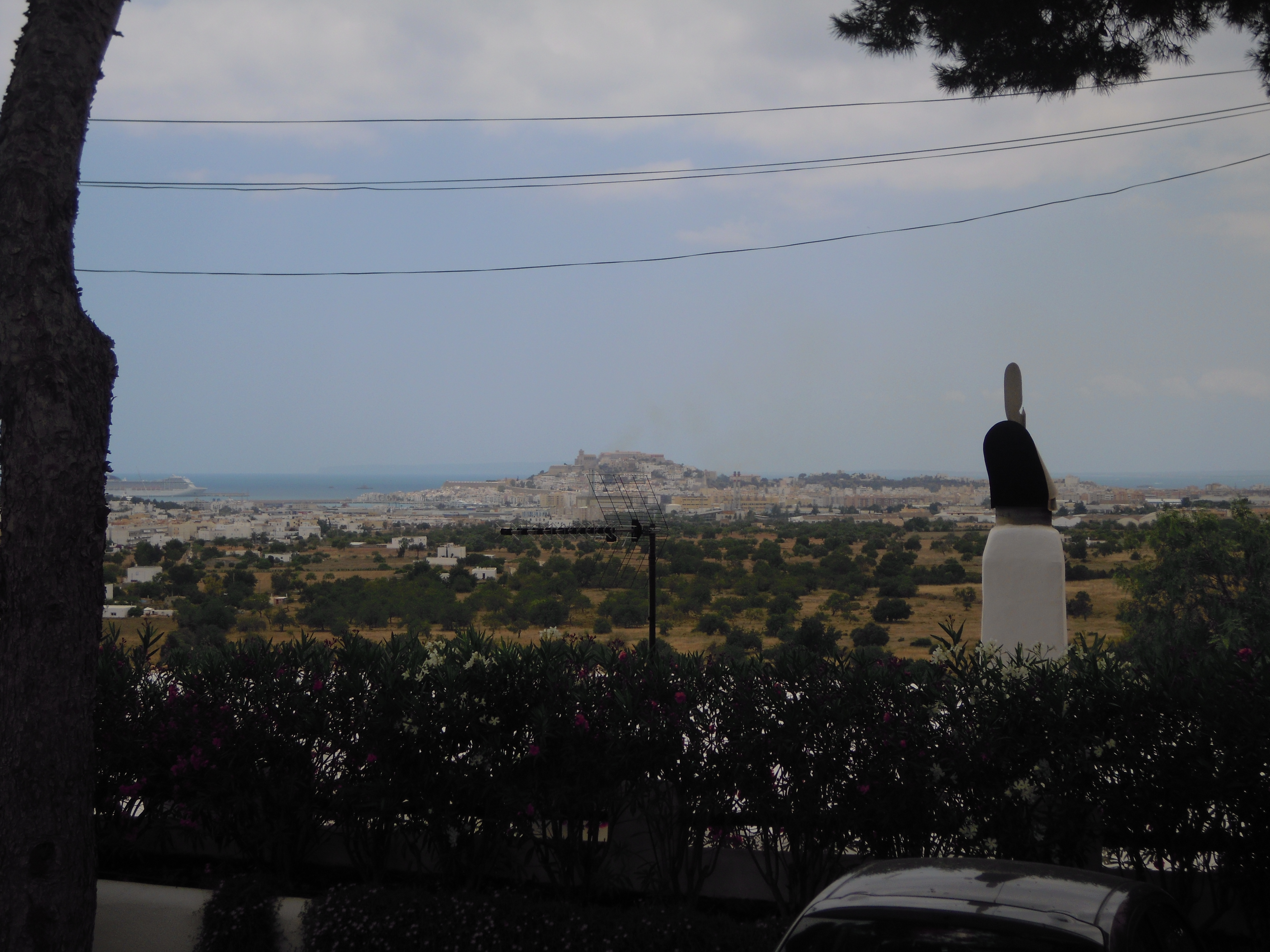
The View to Ibiza Town from the Plinth

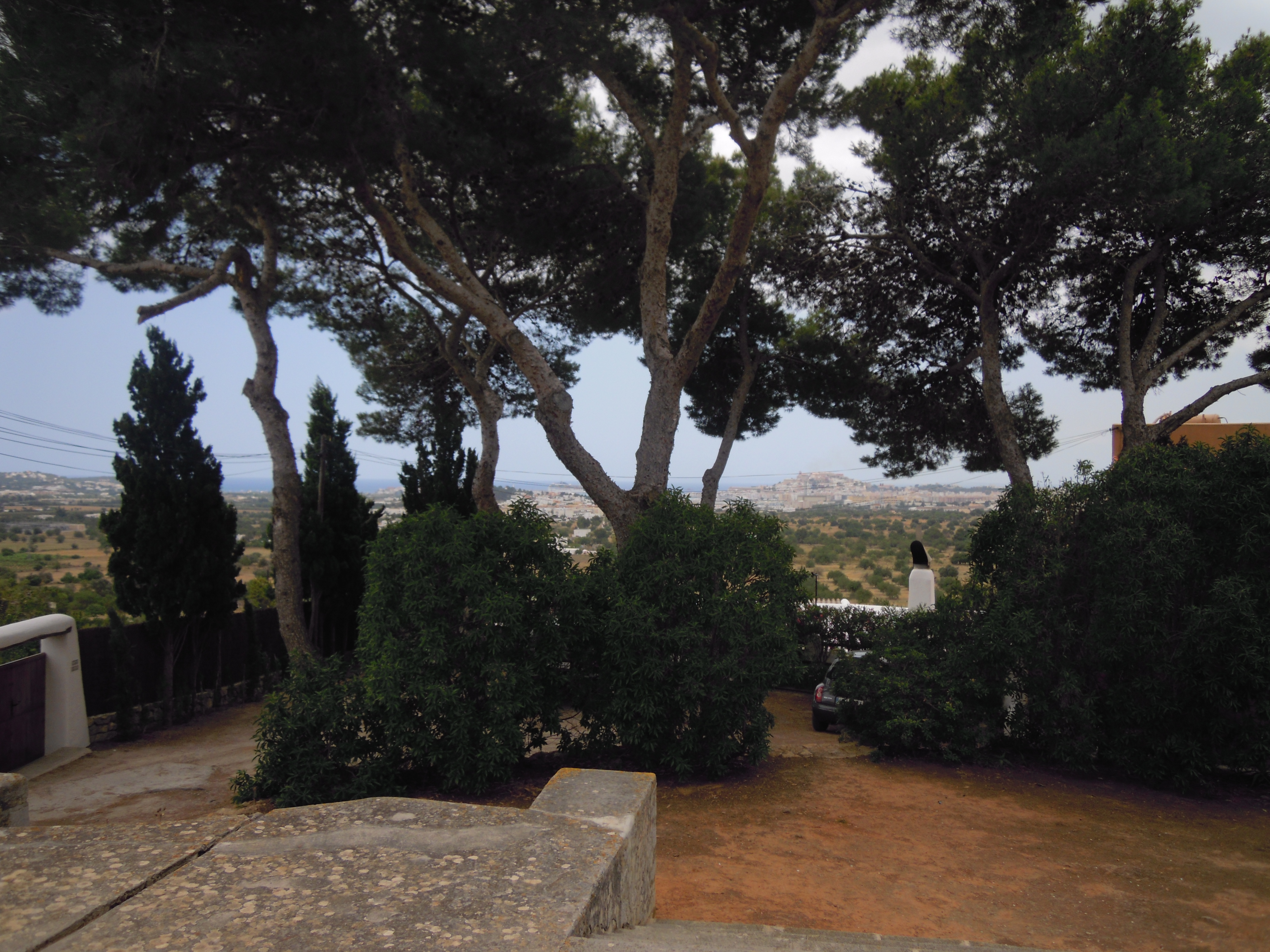

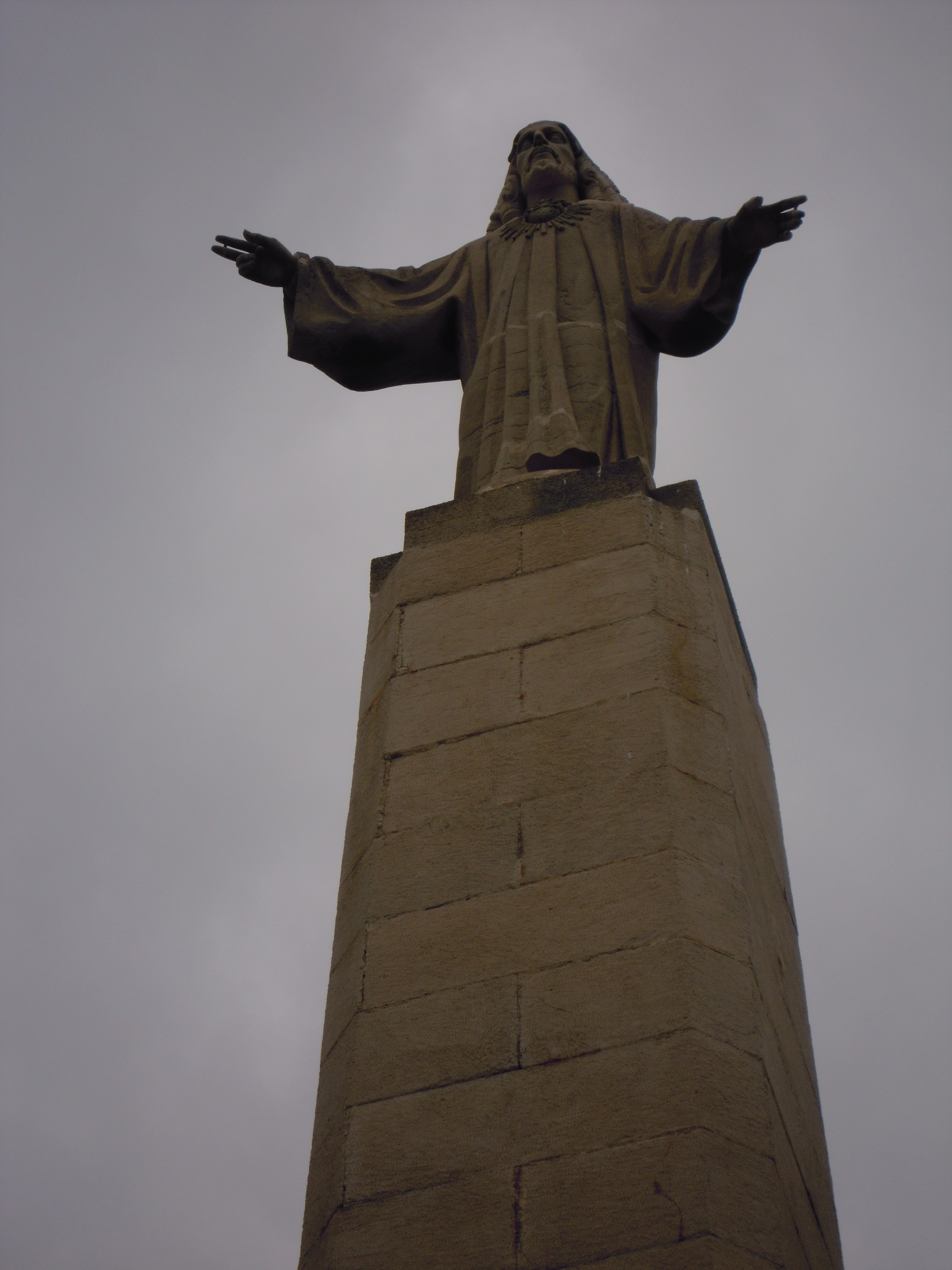

== See also ==
- List of statues of Jesus
