= Cristo Redentore =

Statue by Bruno Innocenti

Christ the Redeemer of Maratea
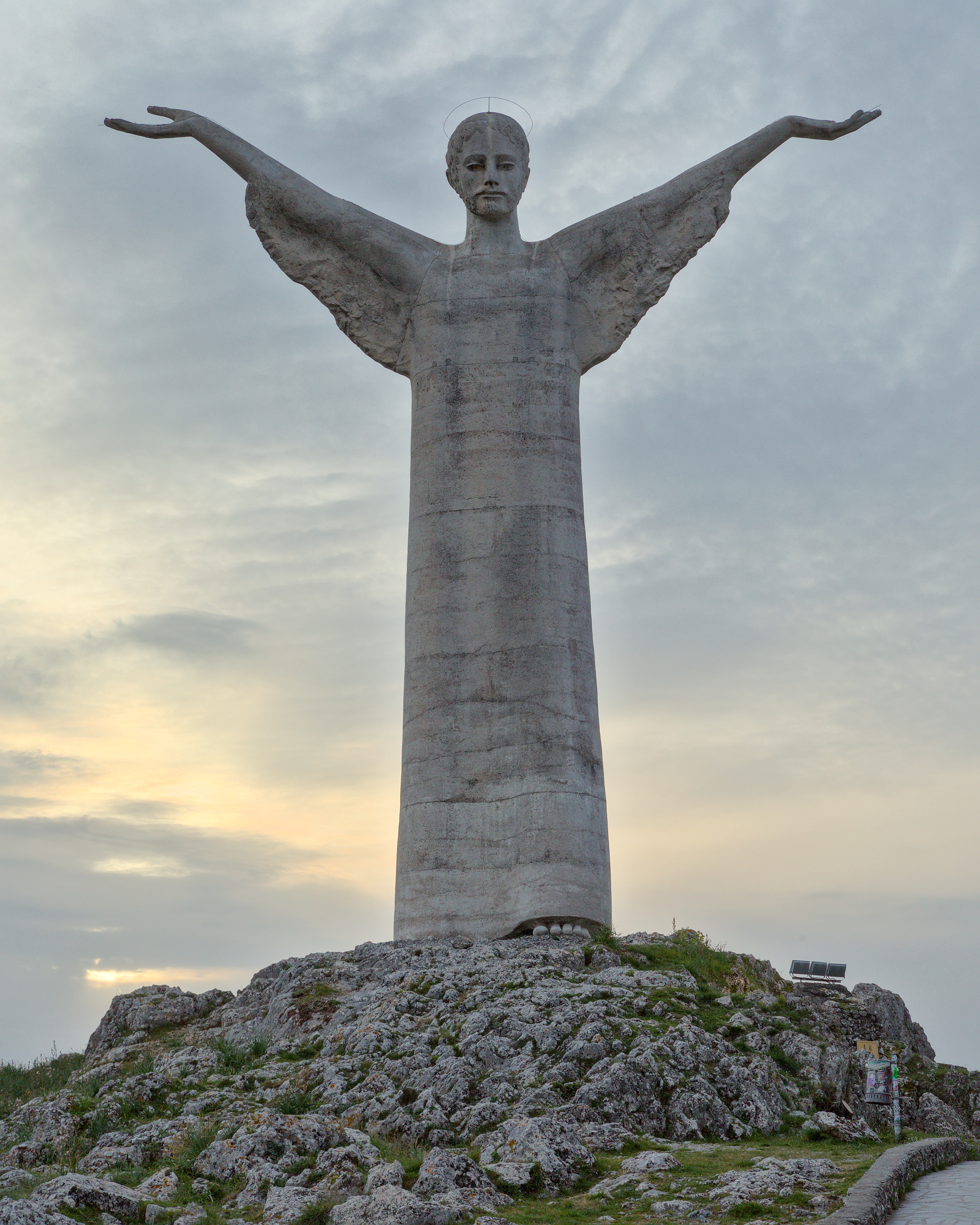

Religion
- Affiliation: Christianity

Location
- Location: Maratea, Italy
- Interactive map of Christ the Redeemer of Maratea
- Coordinates: 39°59′22″N 15°43′19″E

Architecture
- Architect: Stela Maris de Souza
- Type: Statue
- Groundbreaking: 1960
- Completed: 1965

Specifications
- Height (max): 21.20 metres (69.6 ft)
- Materials: Steel, concrete and Carrara marble

The Statue of Christ the Redeemer of Maratea (Italian: Cristo Redentore di Maratea) is a statue of Jesus Christ in Maratea, southern Italy, realized in Carrara marble on the top of the Mountain “St. Biagio".

The sculpture was created by the Florentine sculptor Bruno Innocenti. The entire statue was completed in 1965.

The idea to realize the statue was the Count Stefano Rivetti of Valcervo’s, who was also the promoter and financier of the project execution.

== The statue ==
This is the third tallest statue of Jesus in Europe, after Christ the King in Świebodzin, Poland and Cristo-Rei (Christ the King) in Lisbon, and sixth-largest in the world. It is 21,20 metres high, the head is 3 metres in height and the arm-span is 19 metres from finger tip to finger tip.

== History ==
The idea to realize the statue of Christ the Redeemer in Maratea belongs to the Count Stefano Rivetti di Val Cervo, during his trip in Brazil, while he was flying over the Corcovado. When he came back to Italy he asked Bruno Innocenti, professor of sculpture at the Istituto d’Arte of Florence, to realize the big statue of Christ the Redeemer that became the symbol of Maratea.

== See also ==
- Christ The Redeemer in Rio de Janeiro.
- List of statues of Jesus
