= Virgin and Child from the Sainte-Chapelle =

Ivory sculpture, probably 1260s

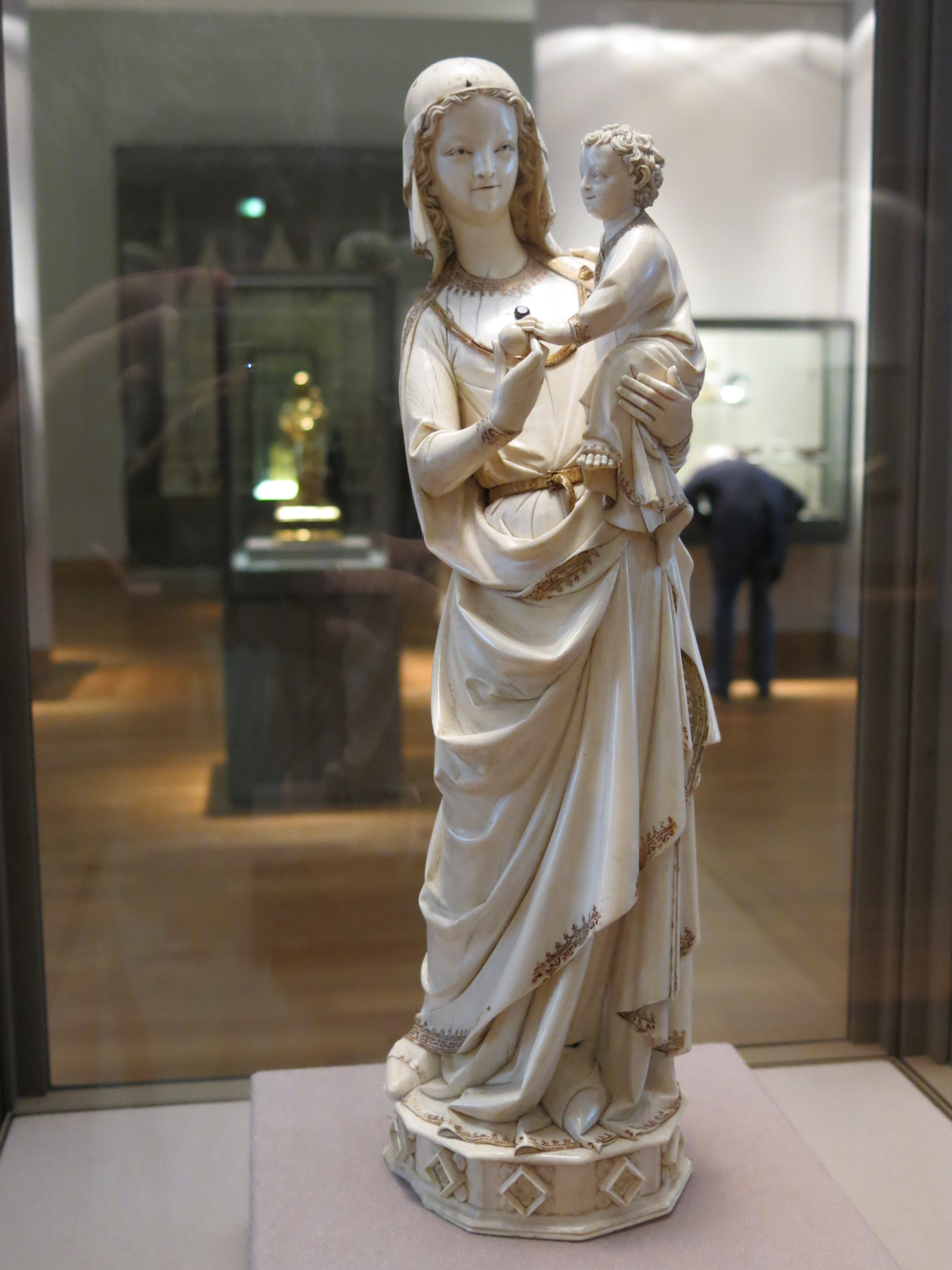
- Artist: Anonymous work
- Year: c. 1260—70
- Type: Ivory
- Dimensions: 41 cm (16 in)
- Location: Louvre, Paris

The Virgin and Child from the Sainte-Chapelle is an ivory sculpture probably created in the 1260s, currently in the possession of the Louvre Museum in Paris. The museum itself describes it as "unquestionably the most beautiful piece of ronde-bosse [in the round] ivory carving ever made", and the finest individual work of art in the wave of ivory sculpture coming out of Paris in the 13th and 14th centuries.

== History ==
After a relative shortage of ivory in Europe during the 11th and 12th centuries, the material once again became in abundance with new trade opening up on the Atlantic ports, particularly those of Normandy. The ivory workshops of Paris were the most admired ones, and the Virgin and Child must have originated from one of these. It is known to have been in the possession of the Sainte-Chapelle by the late 1270s, as it was recorded in the earliest inventory of the church, written some time between 1265 and 1279. It is believed to have been given to the chapel by its patron, Saint Louis. Charles V added a gold plinth and emerald-encrusted ornamentation sometime in the 14th century, but this was removed during the Revolution. Alexandre Lenoir was the one who salvaged the piece from the collection of the church during the Revolution, and exhibited it in his Musée national des Monuments Français. Later it was in the possession of the wealthy Far-Eastern merchant, Louis Fidel Debruge-Dumenil, and when it was acquired by the Louvre in 1861, this was from the collection of Prince Pierre Soltykoff.

== Description ==
The statue, forty-one cm high, represents the pinnacle of Gothic art and beautiful Madonnas, and the late medieval ideal of beauty. The Virgin Mary is portrayed as a young and slender woman; in appearance representative of the aristocracy of the age. Her hip is slightly protruded – giving the figure an S-shape. On her left arm she is resting the baby Jesus, who in turn reaches out his left hand to an apple the Virgin holds up in her right hand. Her robe, with a belt, is almost entirely covered by a coat, all of which is finely decorated with gold. The folds of the cloth are intricately and realistically sculpted towards the bottom. Her narrow, triangular face is surrounded by curly hair and a veil, her eyes are long and narrow, and a slight, playful smile is upon her lips.

The sculpture must have gained great popularity almost immediately, as several imitations can be found from the period following its creation. Of note are similar statues in the Taft Museum in Cincinnati, Ohio (formerly in the treasury of Saint-Denis), the Rijksmuseum in Amsterdam, the Metropolitan Museum in New York and in the museum of Orléans.

== See also ==
- List of statues of Jesus
