= Lamentation over the Dead Christ (Donatello) =

Relief by Donatello

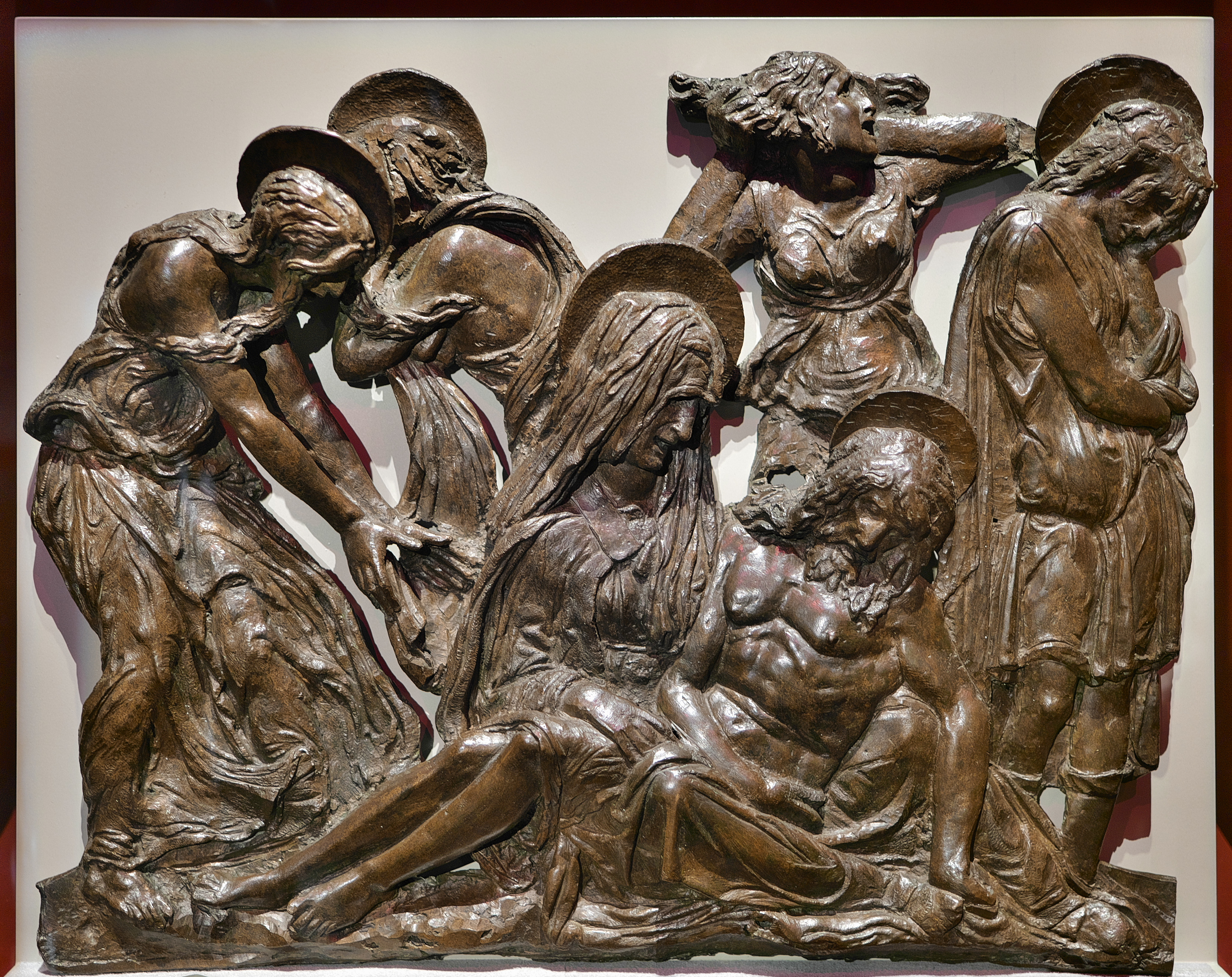
- Artist: Donatello
- Year: c. 1455–1460
- Medium: Bronze cast in relief
- Location: Victoria and Albert Museum; London
- Accession: 8552-1863

The Lamentation over the Dead Christ is an openwork bronze relief sculpture of c. 1455–1460, produced in his old age by Donatello and now in the Victoria and Albert Museum in London. It measures 32.1 by 41.7 cm.

It is generally thought to be a test piece for the bronze doors for Siena Cathedral, a commission from the artist that was contemplated, but never completed. In this case it would date from 1457-1459. It may be the bronze of the subject recorded as being in the cathedral's possession in 1639.

== See also ==
- List of statues of Jesus
