= Sacred Heart of Jesus (Indianapolis) =

- Year: c. 1961
- Type: Marble
- Dimensions: 150 cm × 120 cm × 36 cm (60 in × 46 in × 14 in)
- Location: Indianapolis, Indiana, United States; 39°44′47″N 86°9′29″W
- Owner: Sacred Heart Church

Sacred Heart of Jesus, is a public artwork by an unknown artist, located at Sacred Heart Church, which is in Indianapolis, Indiana, United States of America. It is a marble figure of Jesus standing with his arms outstretched at his sides. He is dressed in robes, barefoot and on his chest is the Sacred Heart. He stands on clouds and thorns, and it is mounted to a base of brick and limestone. Constructed just after 1960, it was on display at Alverna Retreat House in Indianapolis. In 1992 the sculpture was relocated to its current location at Sacred Heart Church.

== Information ==
Sacred Heart of Jesus was originally purchased by the Franciscans for installation at Alverna Retreat House in Indianapolis, in the early 1960s. In the early 1990s the retreat house closed and the sculpture was moved to Sacred Heart Church. Upon being moved to Sacred Heart the sculpture was rededicated. In 1992 architect Donald Wood was commissioned by the Philip Caito Jr. Family. Wood created a shrine in the courtyard of the church grounds, nestled behind a memorial dedicated to Catholic education. A plaque sits on the brick and limestone base stating that the statue was donated by the Caito family and designed by Wood.

== See also ==
- List of statues of Jesus
- Christian symbolism
- Christian art
- Art in Roman Catholicism
