= Fisherman's Memorial (Palacios, Texas) =

Coordinates: 28°41′46″N 96°13′51″W

"King of God"
- Artist: Tuyven Viet Vu, commissioned
- Year: 2013
- Medium: Granite
- Subject: Jesus
- Dimensions: 460 cm (15 ft)
- Weight: 24,000 lbs. (12 tons)
- Location: Palacios, Texas
- Website: https://www.cityofpalacios.org/tourism/page/arts-culture

The Fisherman's Memorial is a granite statue of Jesus located in Palacios, Texas. The statue is placed on private land near the edge of Matagorda Bay.

== Origin ==
In 1975, many Vietnamese fled Vietnam and immigrated to the United States. Some migrated to southern Texas and worked in the Gulf of Mexico fishing and shrimping industry. In 2012, a former shrimp fisherman of Palacios, Texas named Tuyven Vien Vu, established a memorial for fishermen lost at sea.

For about 20 years, Vu wanted to honor "shrimpers" and fishermen who had died at sea. He cited one event in particular that had prompted him to establish the memorial. As a shrimper for many years with his brother and cousin, one day they pulled up a human skull in their shrimp net. After informing authorities, Vu stated that he "became sad because I knew that there was a family out there missing their loved one."

Vu ordered the statue from Vietnam. It required six months for the statue to be carved and shipped whole to Texas.

== Fisherman's Memorial ==
The memorial is a 15-foot tall granite statue of Jesus who is portrayed open armed. The Sacred Heart of Jesus is carved in relief on the statue's chest. The statue is named "King of God" and stands on a 15-foot tall, three-tiered pedestal that raises the statue to a height of 30 feet. Inset on the pedestal is a relief carving of three fishermen, "an American, a Hispanic, and a Vietnamese", depicted as holding a ship's steering wheel.

The Fisherman's Memorial is located at Turning g basin #3 on the property of the Bayside RV Park and overlooks the Palacios Harbor and Tres Palacios Bay. The site also offers a view of West Matagorda Bay, the location of the largest shrimp fleet on the Texas Gulf Coast. According to David Aparicio, the owner of Bayside RV Park, "the location is a high spot and the angle the statue will stand will allow all fishermen leaving and returning to see the statue." Aparicio also stated that "God has blessed us fishermen who make a living in the sea."

== Palacios, Texas ==
The memorial is described on the City of Palacios internet site. Other sites of interest in Palacios mentioned on the site are the City by the Sea Museum, the Petite la Belle shipwreck, and some homes listed on the National Register of Historic Places.

== See also ==
- Palacios, Texas
- List of statues of Jesus

== Other sources ==
- City of Palacios
- Fisherman Memorial statue at TB#3
- Tripadvisor: Fisherman's Memorial
- City by the Sea Museum
- La Petite Belle
