= Christ of the Lanterns =

Monument in Cordoba, Spain

Coordinates: 37°53′17″N 4°46′39″W

- Cristo de los Faroles
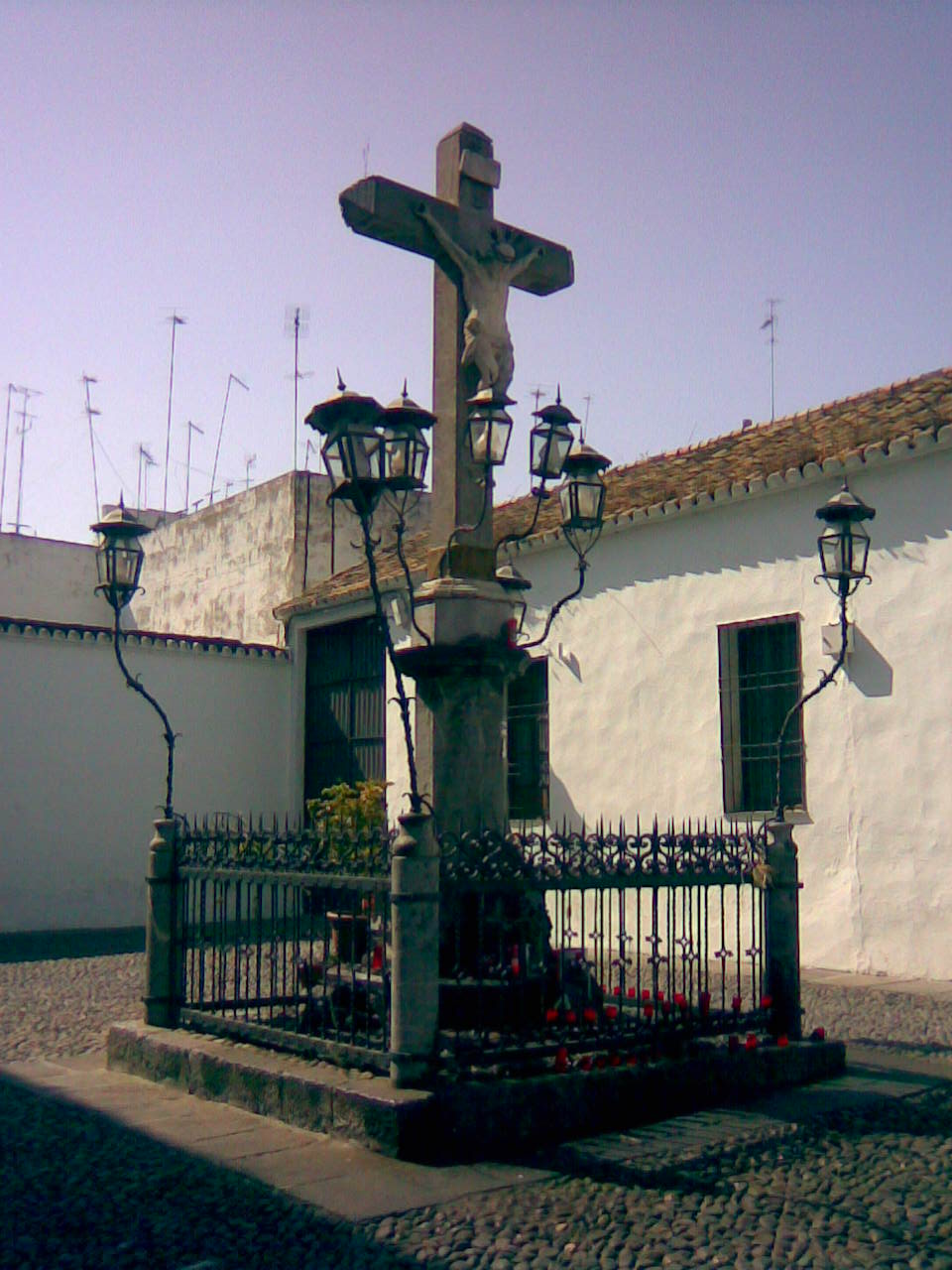
- Artist: Juan Navarro León
- Year: 1794
- Location: Plaza de los Capuchinos, Cordoba, Spain

The Christ of Atonement and Mercy, popularly known as the Christ of the Lanterns (Spanish: Cristo de los Faroles), is a large Crucifix located at the Plaza de los Capuchinos in Cordoba, Spain.

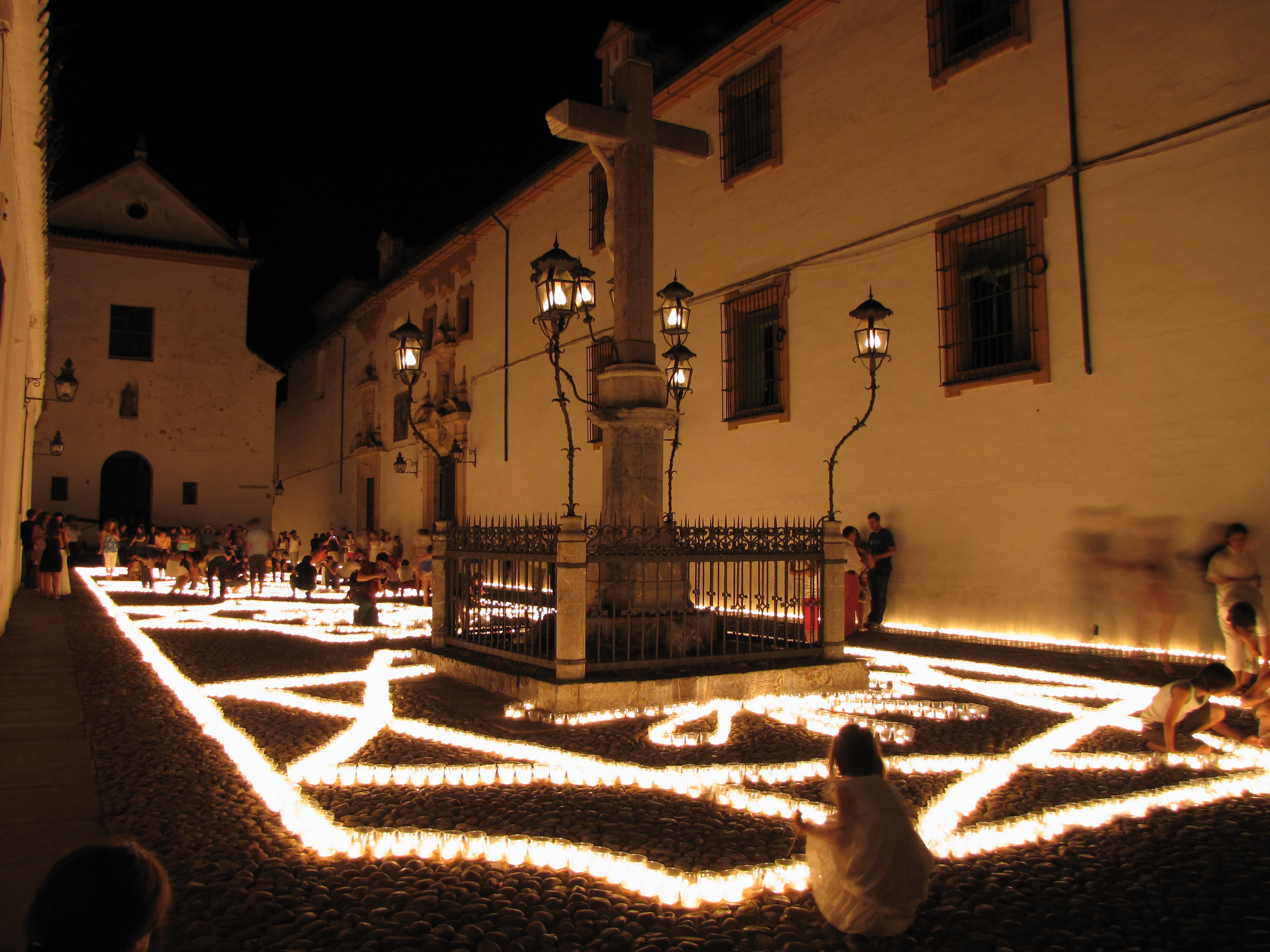
Nighttime celebration at Christ of the Lanterns illuminated by candles

The sculpture was created in 1794 by the sculptor Juan Navarro León under a commission by the Capuchin friar Diego José de Cádiz. Its popular name comes from the eight lanterns set on iron mounts that illuminate it. The current appearance of the sculpture has developed with the construction of a fence in the 20th century and the replacement of the lanterns with darker ones in 1984.

== See also ==
- List of statues of Jesus
