= Cristo del Pacífico =

Statue in Lima, Peru

Coordinates: 12°10′27″S 77°01′44″W

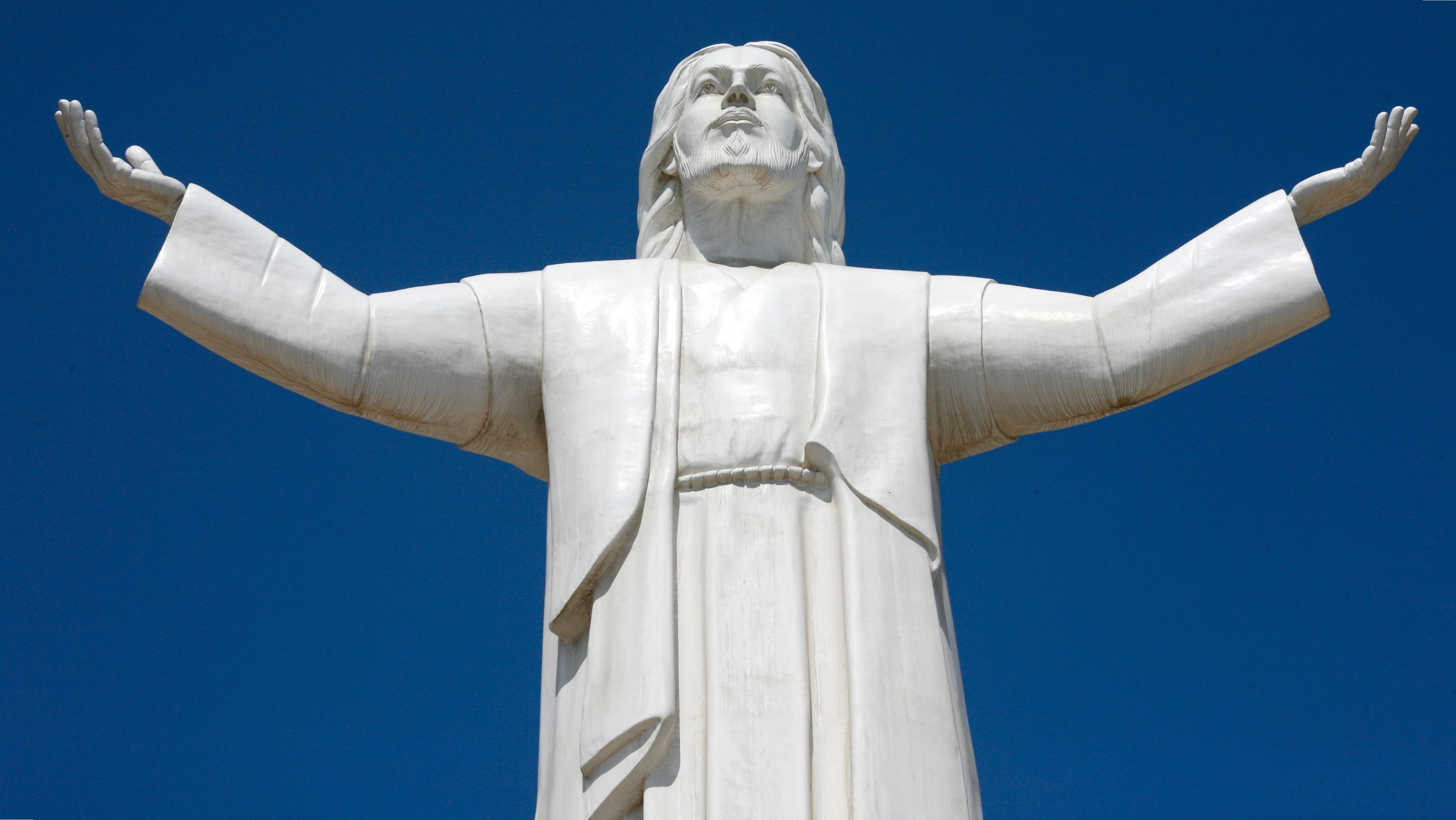
The Jesus above Chorrillos

Cristo del Pacífico, "the Christ of the Pacific", is a 37-metre-high (121 ft) statue of Jesus erected in Lima, Peru, in 2011. Its erection was a gift from a consortium of Brazilian companies to the city of Lima, under former President Alan García, and described as a parting gift to the nation on occasion of his leaving office after the 2011 presidential election. It was inspired by the Christ the Redeemer statue in Rio de Janeiro.

== Height ==
At 37 metres (121 feet) including its pedestal, and 22 m (72 ft) without, the statue is smaller than the Christ the Redeemer statue in Rio de Janeiro, which measures 39.6 m (130 ft), 30 m (98 ft) without its pedestal.

== See also ==
- List of statues of Jesus
