= Cerro del Cubilete =

Mountain in Guanajuato, Mexico

Coordinates: 21.012°N 101.369°W

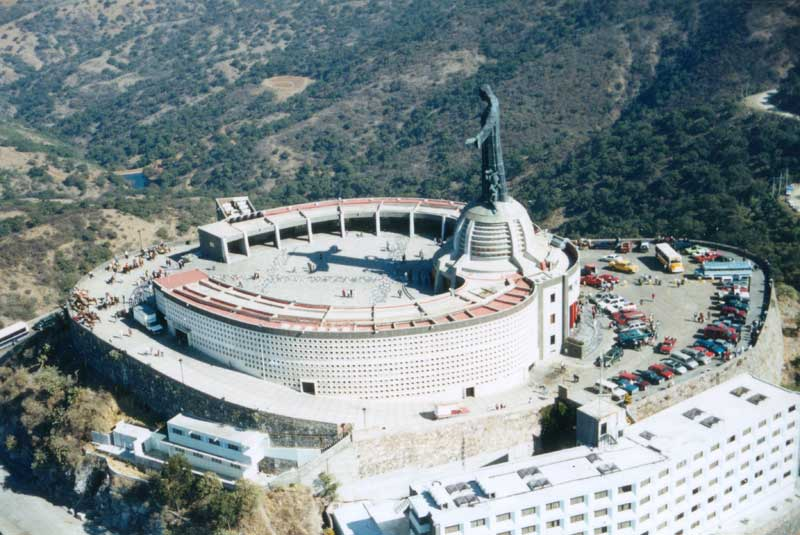
Cristo Rey sanctuary atop the hill of the Cubilete.

The Cerro del Cubilete ("Dice Cup Hill") is a hill in Silao, Guanajuato, in Mexico. Approximately 30 miles southeast of Léon, it is said to be the geographical center of Mexico. Rising 2,580 metres (8,460 ft) above sea level, Cerro del Cubilete offers a panoramic view of Bajío. At the top of the hill is the 25 metre high Cristo Rey (Christ the King) statue by Mexican sculptor Fidias Elizondo, which attracts many visitors on pilgrimages.

== See also ==
- List of statues of Jesus
