= Pietà (Southern German, Cloisters) =

Painted wood sculpture

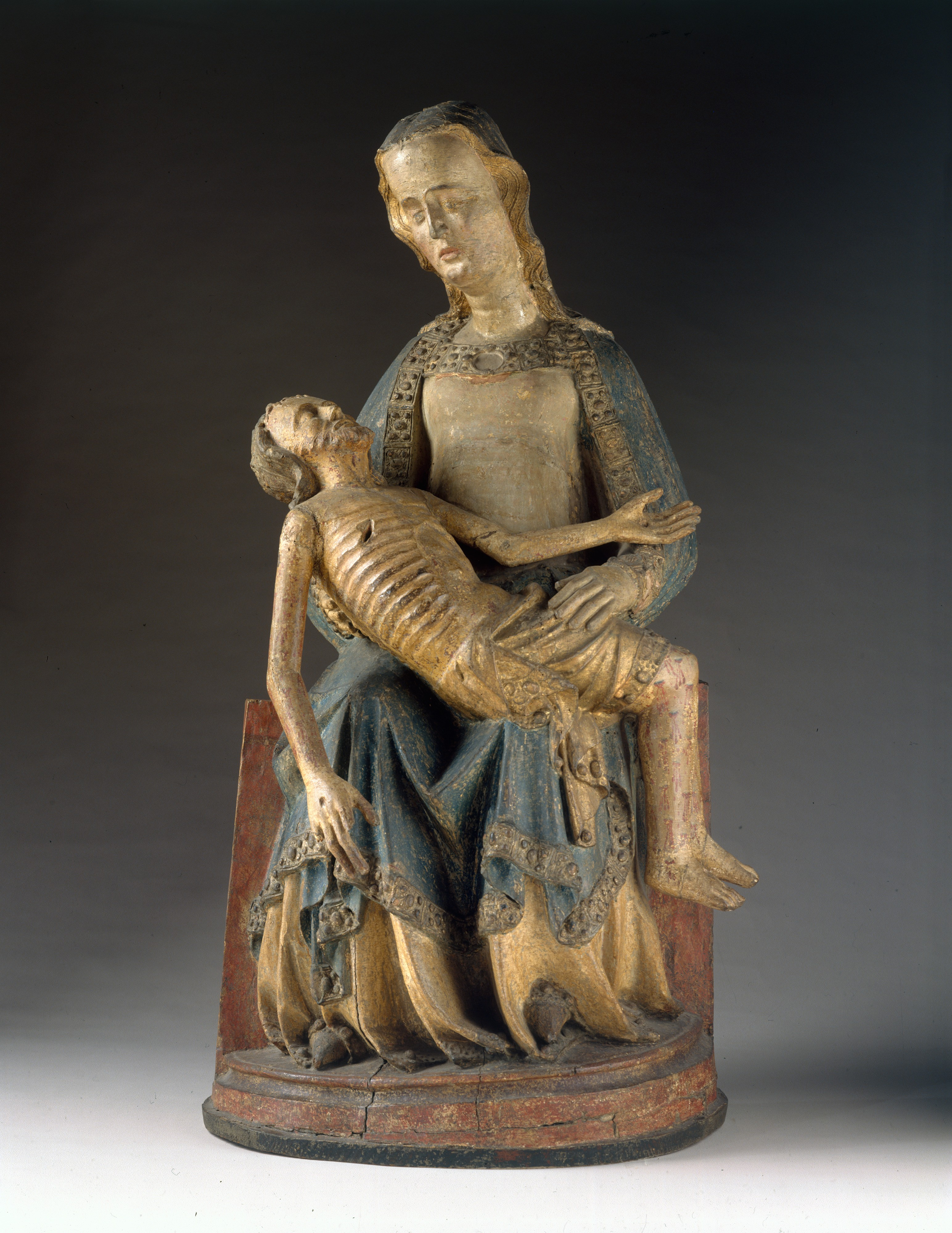
Pietà, Height: 132.7 cm (52 in), German, Rhine Valley, Cologne (?), c. 1375–1400

Pietà (German: Vesperbild) a small painted wood sculpture dated to c. 1375–1400, now in the collection of the Cloisters, New York. Very little is known of it, except that is probably of southern German origin. The statuette emphasises the suffering of both the Virgin and Jesus Christ. Its stylistic characteristics, including its iconography, pathos, austerity, high reliefs and links to 13th century German mysticism texts, suggest it probably came from, or near, the Rhine Valley.

Mary is shown in grief and mourning, holding the body of her son on her lap, as she leans over him and faces towards his crown of thorns. Christ body is emaciated, shrunken, decomposing and lacerated with the wounds of his crucifixion. Because of its small size and intimacy, the Pietà was probably not intended for a main church altar, rather for either a side altar or home altar to be viewed by those in repentance.

== Description ==
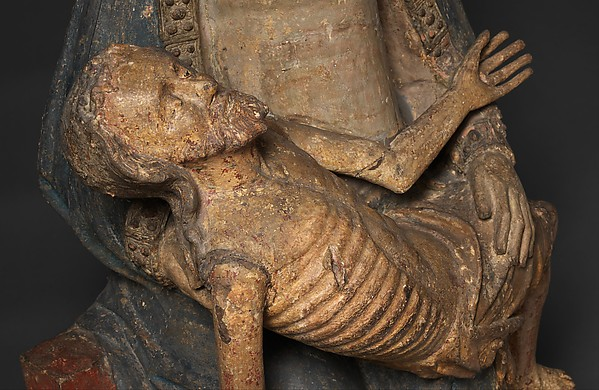
Detail showing the dead body of Christ

The statuette is made from poplar wood, plaster, paint and gilding. Its back is hollowed out, although closed with a board. It was for a period attached to a reliquary. This German style was adapted by French carvers, although with softer and less brutally realistic tones.

The work shows an enthroned and sorrowful Virgin holding the lifeless body of the dead Christ. The image is realistic and grim; his ribs protrude, his stomach is sunken and he shows visible signs of rigor mortis; and he bears the bloody wounds of the Passion, with the stigmata on his hands, feet, and side. Mary's upper body is somewhat rigid, stiff and awkward, compared to the fluidity of Christ, and the lower layers of her dress. According to art historian William Forsyth, the "large soft folds of the Virgin's cloak around her legs and over her body clothe her with majesty befitting so august a mourner". The figures are carved in high relief, which can be seen especially in the deep concave folds of the dress around Mary's legs.

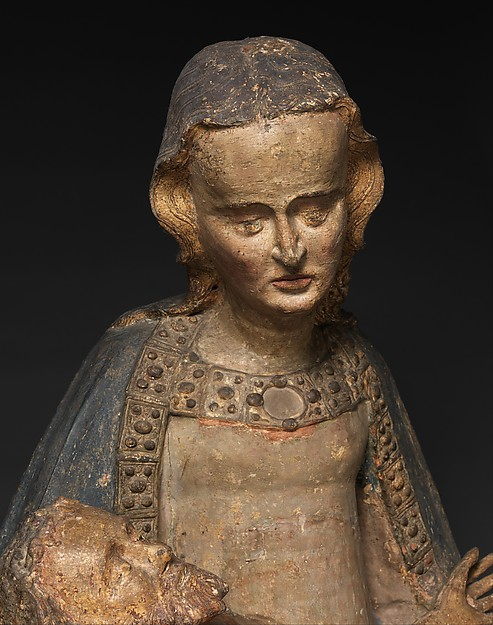
Detail of the Virgin

Images of the Virgin cradling the body of her son in her arms and lap are known as "Pietà", and were a popular devotional subject in the later Middle Ages from the 13th century, especially in nunneries, possibly under Byzantine influence, as a form of the Lamentation of Christ. In this version, internal harmony is achieved by Christ's limp and outstretched form, echoing the curve of the Virgin's body, which is turned slightly towards the viewer. The early German examples, such as this, are intended to evoke pity; art historian William Wixom writes that "the worshipers' feelings are not spared but are lacerated, as was Christ's body, inducing a state of repentance in the beholder". According to Wixom, Pietà statuettes such as this example were intentionally stoic and gruesome, "designed to have a profound emphatic effect on those who said their prayers before them."

The scale of the work is significant in two aspects; in overall size, and in the relative size of the figures in relation to each other. The scale of the statuette's diminutive size (132.7 x 69.5 x 36.8 cm) indicates that it might have derived from a 13th-century south German mystical belief that the Virgin, in her grief, imagined Christ as an infant once again as she held his body after the crucifixion, and that his burial shroud is instead his swaddling clothes. Christ is diminutive relative to her monumental scale. This approach allows the emphasis of the work to focus on her suffering.

The fourteenth century Dominican mystic, Henry Suso, in his "Little Book of Holy Wisdom", vocalised the Virgin's thoughts as, "I took my tender child (mein zartes kind) upon my lap and gazed upon him, but he was dead." Saint Bernardino wrote that the Virgin is remembering of his childhood in Bethlehem, while Saint Brigid says she is looking "at his eyes full of blood."

== Provenance ==
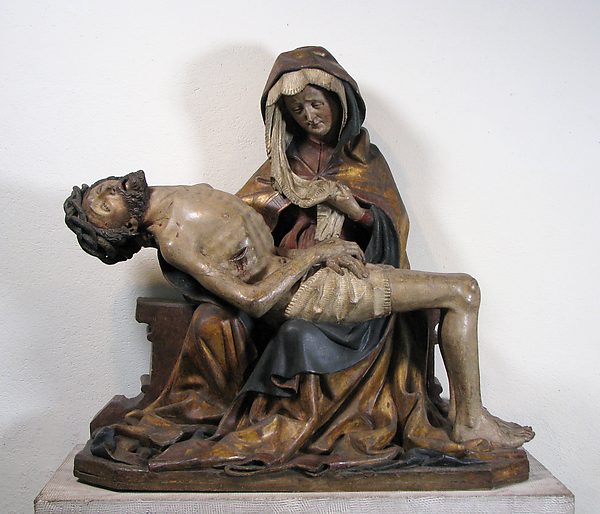
Pietà, Swabian, c. 1435-40

It was acquired by the Cloisters in 1948 using the Jacob S. Rogers fund, having previously been in the collection of the collector and art historian Lucien J. Demotte, of Paris and New York. The museum has one other roughly contemporary example of this kind of Pietà, from Swabia, dated to c. 1435–40.

== Sources ==
- Forsyth, William. "Medieval Statues of the Pietà in the Museum." The Metropolitan Museum of Art Bulletin, Volume 11, no. 7, March 1953. 177–184
- Husband, Timothy; Little, Charles. Europe in the Middle Ages. New York: The Metropolitan Museum of Art, 1987, Nr 11
- Stein, Wendy. How to Read Medieval Art. New York: The Metropolitan Museum of Art, 2016. ISBN 978-1-5883-9597-9
- Wixom, William. "Medieval Sculpture at The Cloisters". The Metropolitan Museum of Art Bulletin, Volume 46, no. 3, Winter, 1988–1989
