= Cristo de la Concordia =

Statue of Jesus in Cochabamba, Bolivia

Coordinates: 17°23′04″S 66°08′04″W

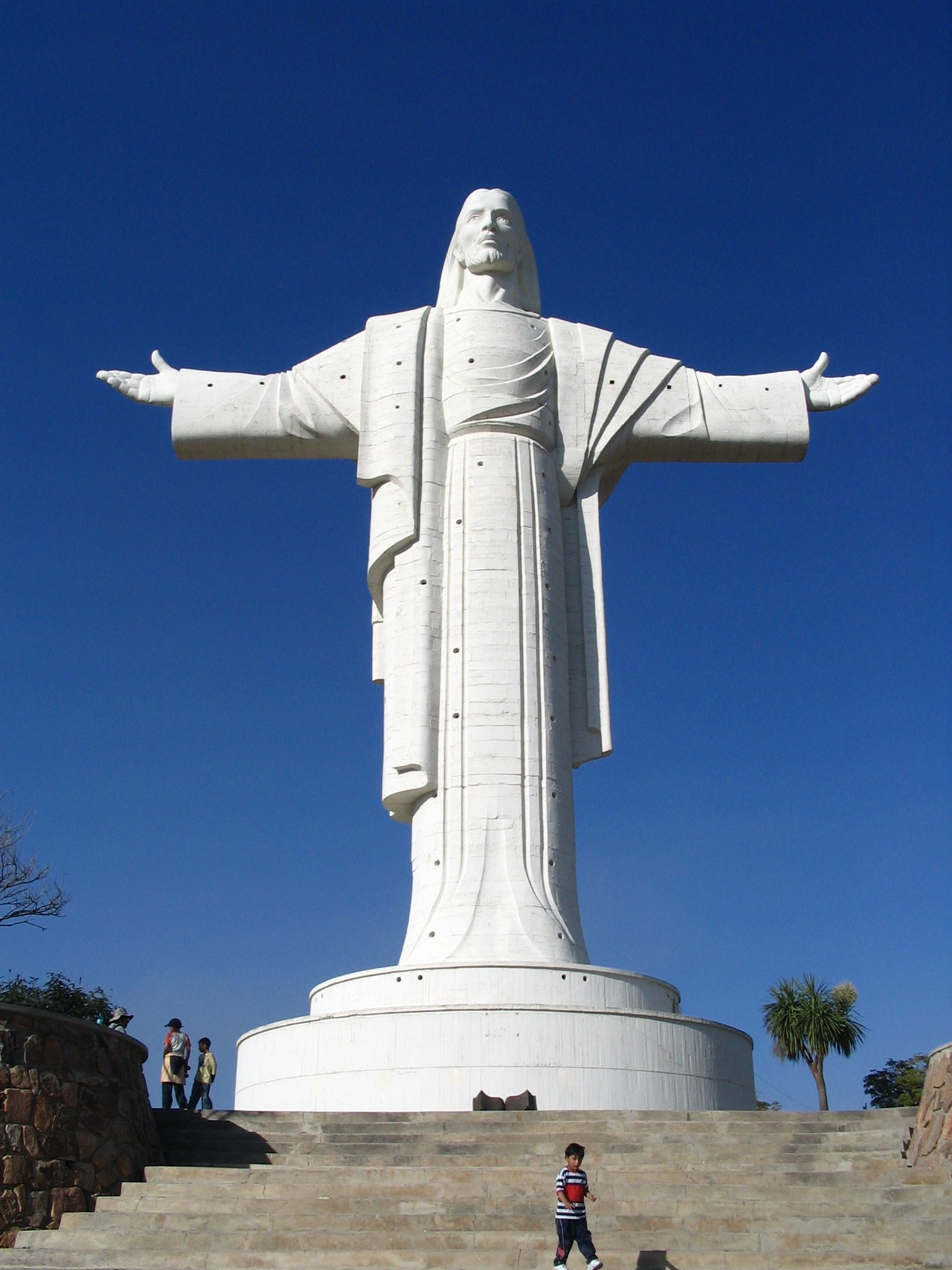

Religion
- Affiliation: Christianity

Location
- Location: Cochabamba, Bolivia
- Interactive map of Cristo de la Concordia

Architecture
- Architects: César and Wálter Terrazas Pardo
- Type: Statue
- Groundbreaking: 12 Jul 1987
- Completed: 20 Nov 1994

Specifications
- Height (max): 39.68 metres (130.2 ft)
- Materials: Steel and concrete

Cristo de la Concordia (Christ of Peace) is a statue of Jesus Christ located atop San Pedro Hill, to the east of Cochabamba, Bolivia. It is accessible by cable car, or by climbing 2,000 steps. The statue is 33.44 metres (109.7 ft) tall, on a pedestal of 6.24 metres (20.5 ft), for a total height of 39.68 metres (130.2 ft).

== Construction ==
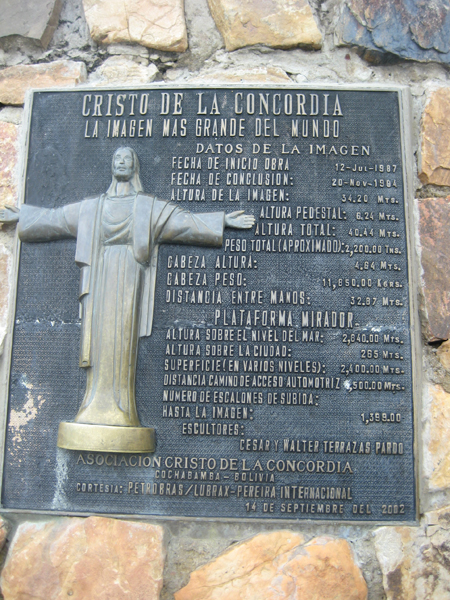
Plaque describing the statue in Cochabamba, Bolivia.

Construction of the statue began on 12 July 1987, and was completed 20 November 1994. It was designed by César and Wálter Terrazas Pardo, and was modeled after the statue Christ the Redeemer in Rio de Janeiro. Standing 265 metres (869 ft) above the city of Cochabamba, the statue rises 2,840.00 metres (9,317.59 ft) above sea level. Upon its completion, it became the largest statue of Jesus Christ in the world, surpassing the one it was modeled after. It weighs approximately 2,200 tonnes (2,200,000 kg). The head of the statue is 4.64 metres (15.2 ft) tall, and weighs 11,850 kilograms (26,120 lb). The arms span 32.87 metres (107.8 ft). The statue has a surface area of 2,400 sq. metres (25,833 sq. ft.). 1,399 stairs lead to a viewing area inside the arms of the statue, but visitors are only permitted to make the ascent on Sundays.

== Design ==
The statue is slightly smaller than Christ the King in Świebodzin, Poland (36 m tall if the 2 metres (6.6 ft) high crown of Christ the King is counted) and taller than the Christ the Redeemer (30 m tall) outside Rio de Janeiro, Brazil, which all are smaller than the 61-meter statue of Jesus Christ in North Sumatra, Indonesia, which was completed in 2024. It is the third largest statue in the Southern Hemisphere, after the statue of Virgen de la Paz in Venezuela, and the statue of Saint Rita of Cascia in Brazil. The left hand of the statue points to the South, and the right points to the North.

Initially, the statue was planned to be exactly 33 metres (108 ft), one metre for every year of Jesus Christ's life. However, an extra 44 centimetres (17 in) was added as "well-coiffed" hair atop Christ's head, making it taller than its brother in Rio de Janeiro. Locals from Cochabamba say the discrepancy accounts for Christ living "a little past" his 33rd year.

== See also ==
- List of statues of Jesus
