= Jesus Christ the King of the Universe =

Colossal statue in Poland

- Jezus Chrystus Król Wszechświata
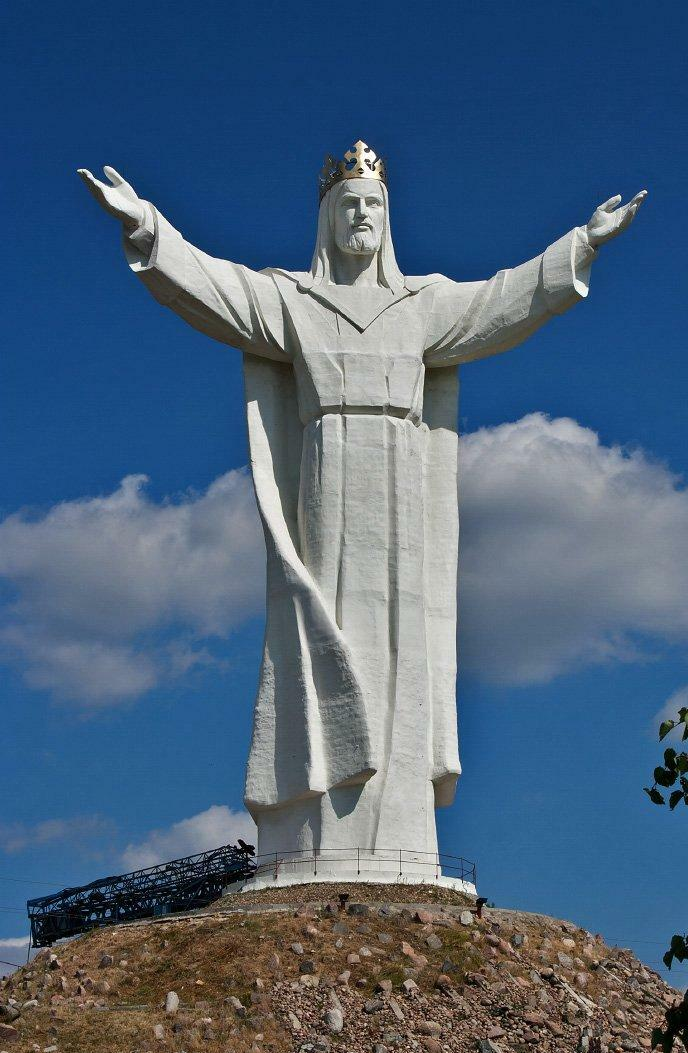
- The statue in September 2017

Religion
- Affiliation: Roman Catholic

Location
- Location: Świebodzin, Poland
- Interactive map of Jesus Christ the King of the Universe

Architecture
- Architect: Mirosław Kazimierz Patecki
- Type: Statue
- Groundbreaking: 29 September 2006
- Completed: 6 November 2010

Specifications
- Height (max): 52°14′12.00″N 15°32′47.00″E 33 metres (108 ft) (statue); 52.5 metres (172 ft) (with pedestal)
- Materials: Concrete

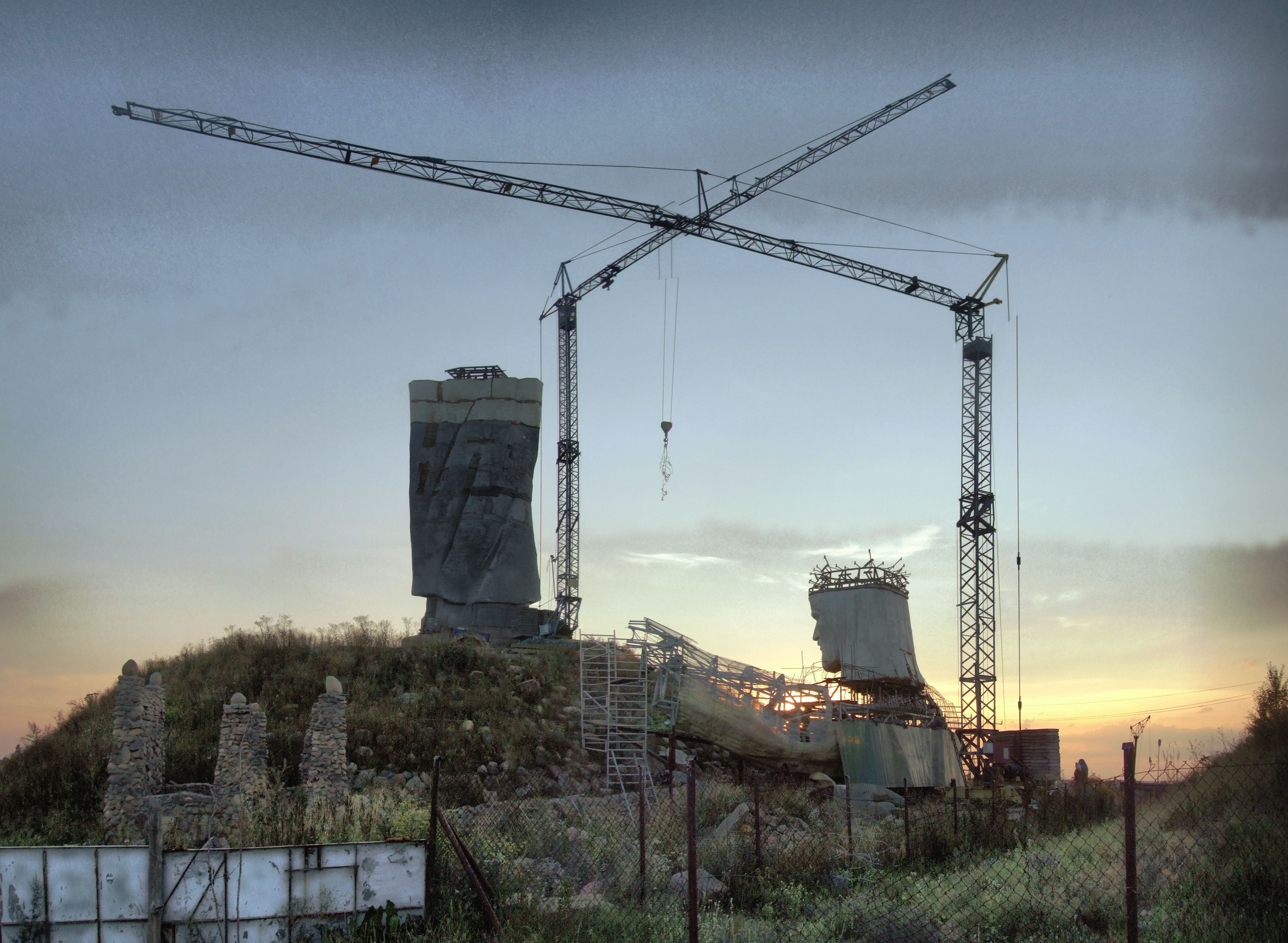
The statue under construction in August 2010

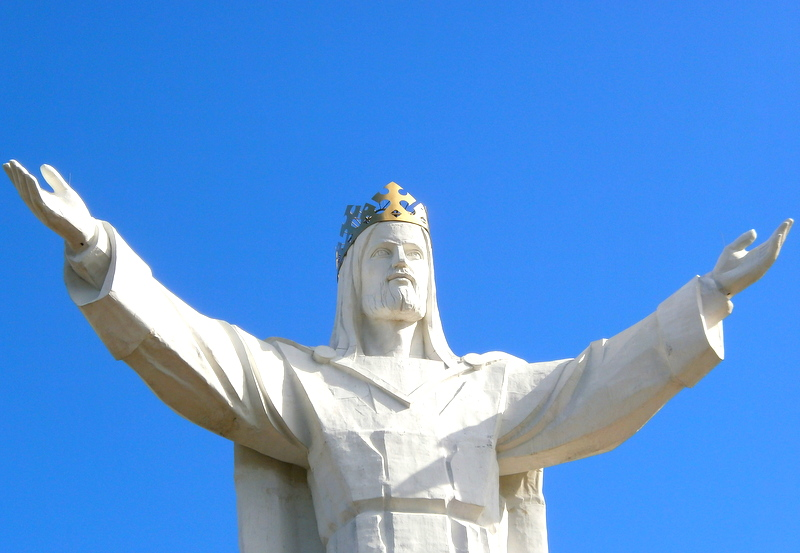
The statue in September 2012

Jesus Christ the King of the Universe (Polish: Jezus Chrystus Król Wszechświata) is a statue of Jesus Christ in Świebodzin, western Poland, completed on 6 November 2010. The figure is 33 metres (108 ft) tall, the crown is 2 metres (6.6 ft) tall, and along with its mound, it reaches 52.5 metres (172 ft) overall. It took five years in total to construct and cost around $1.5 million to build, which was collected from donations of the 21,000 residents of the town. The project was conceived and led by Sylwester Zawadzki, a retired Polish priest. For some time it was the tallest Jesus statue in the world according to the Guinness Book of World Records, until a 61-meter tall statue was unveiled in North Sumatra, Indonesia, in 2024.

== Characteristics ==
The statue was built on a 16.5-metre (54 ft) embankment of stones and rubble. Christ the King has a height of 33 metres (108 ft), symbolising Jesus' age at his death; combined with its mound and crown, it reaches 52.5 metres (172 ft). The crown of the temple is 3.5 metres (11 ft) in diameter and 2 metres (6.6 ft) in height, and the whole is gilded. It weighs 440 tons. The head alone is 4.5 metres (15 ft) tall and weighs 15 tons. Each hand is 6 metres (20 ft) in length and the distance between the ends of the fingers is 24 metres (79 ft). It is composed of concrete and fibreglass. It is 3 metres (9.8 ft) taller than the better known statue of Christ the Redeemer in Rio de Janeiro, standing at 30.1 metres (99 ft) tall without its pedestal.

Wi-Fi antennas were discovered in the crown of the statue in 2018 by a Polish tabloid; the internet provider later stated the local church was using them as a surveillance system. Afterwards, the local bishop ordered their removal before 10 May 2018.

== Design ==
The designs for various elements of the statue were produced by a number of individuals; the sculpture design was primarily produced by Mirosław Kazimierz Patecki with the technical design aspect being undertaken by Assoc. Jakub Marcinowski and Assoc. Mikołaj Kłapeć, both of whom are employees of the University of Zielona Gora. Meanwhile, elements of the clothing and the arms of the statue were designed by Tomasz Stafiniak and Krzysztof Nawojski (the latter being of the town of Świebodzin) respectively. Another resident of Świebodzin, Marian Wybraniec, was responsible for the design of the foundations upon which the statue was constructed.

The construction work was undertaken by staff employed by the Sanctuary of Divine Mercy in Świebodzin and included welders, locksmiths and mechanics.

== Construction ==
On 29 September 2006, the city council of Świebodzin passed a resolution on the establishment of Christ the King. The President (under the authority of the board) along with the mayor spoke to the Bishop of Zielona Góra-Gorzów Diocese. State officials also temporarily halted the project due to safety concerns. With funding from local people and as far away as Canada, the statue was completed on 6 November 2010 and was at the time the largest statue of Jesus Christ according to the Guinness Book of World Records.

== See also ==
- Mug (2018 film)
- List of statues of Jesus
- List of tallest statues
- enthronement movement
