= Christ the King (Almada) =

Sanctuary of Christ the King
- National Shrine of Christ the King
- Santuário de Cristo Rei
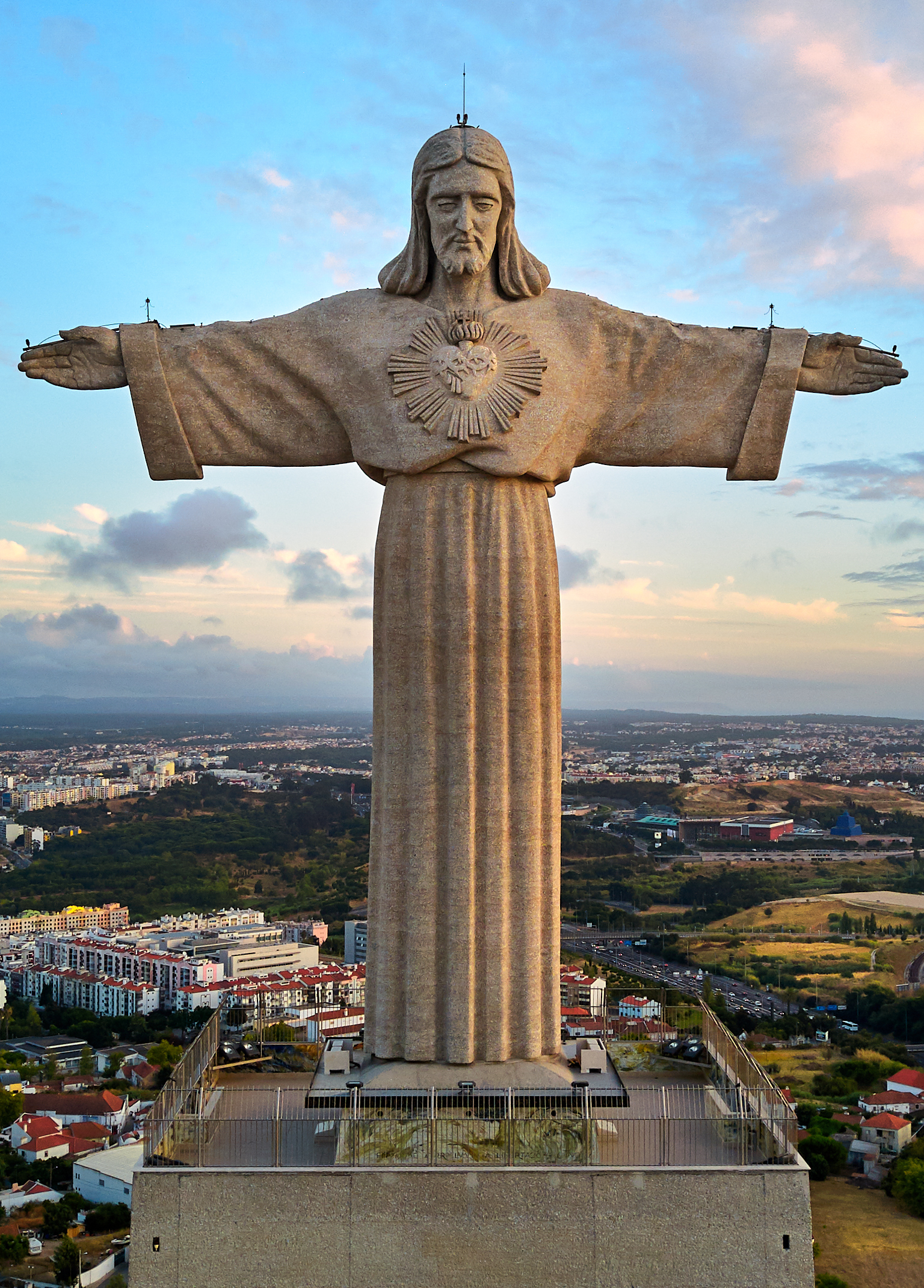
- The outstretched arms of the Christ the King sanctuary, projected towards the city of Lisbon
- Sanctuary of Christ the King
- 38°40′43″N 9°10′17″W
- Location: Almada, Setúbal District
- Country: Portugal
- Website: http://www.cristorei.pt/

History
- Dedication: National tribute to the Sacred Heart

Architecture
- Architect: António Lino
- Style: Modern architecture

Specifications
- Width: 28 m (92 ft) finger to finger.
- Height: 110 m (360 ft) incl. base. Figure = 28 m Base= 82 m.

Administration
- Diocese: Diocese of Setúbal

The Sanctuary of Christ the King (Portuguese: Santuário de Cristo Rei) is a Catholic monument and shrine dedicated to the Sacred Heart of Jesus Christ overlooking the city of Lisbon situated in Almada, in Portugal. It was inspired by the Christ the Redeemer statue of Rio de Janeiro, in Brazil, after the Cardinal Patriarch of Lisbon visited that monument. The project was inaugurated on 17 May 1959. The giant statue was erected to express gratitude because the Portuguese were spared the direct destructive effects of World War II.

== History ==
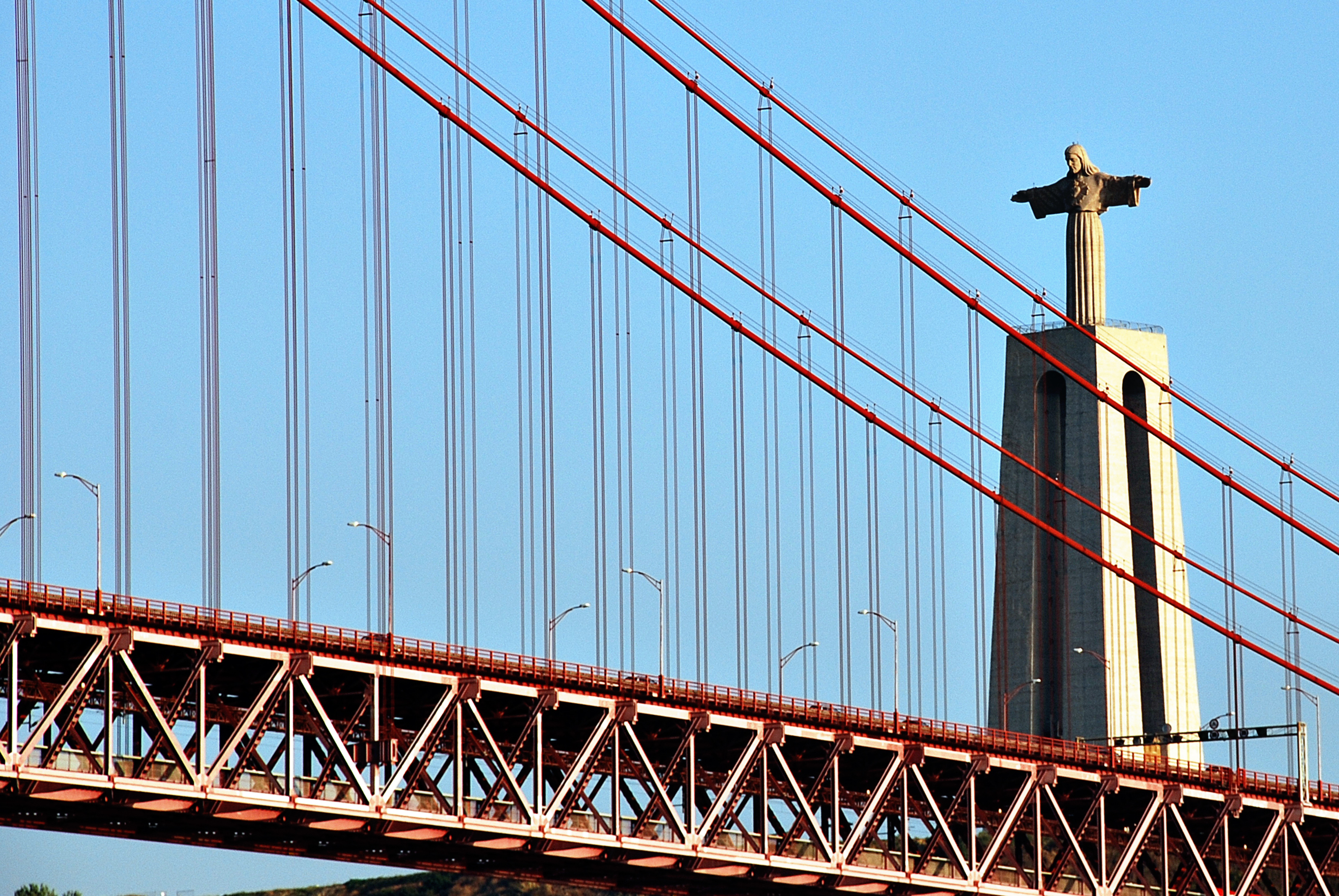
View from the 25 de Abril Bridge

The construction of the Christ the King monument was approved in a Portuguese Episcopate conference, held in Fatima on 20 April 1940, as a plea to God to release Portugal from entering World War II and celebrate the 50th anniversary of the act of consecration of the world to the Sacred Heart of Jesus. However, the idea had originated earlier on a visit of the Cardinal Patriarch of Lisbon to Rio de Janeiro in 1934, soon after the inauguration of the statue of Christ the Redeemer in 1931.

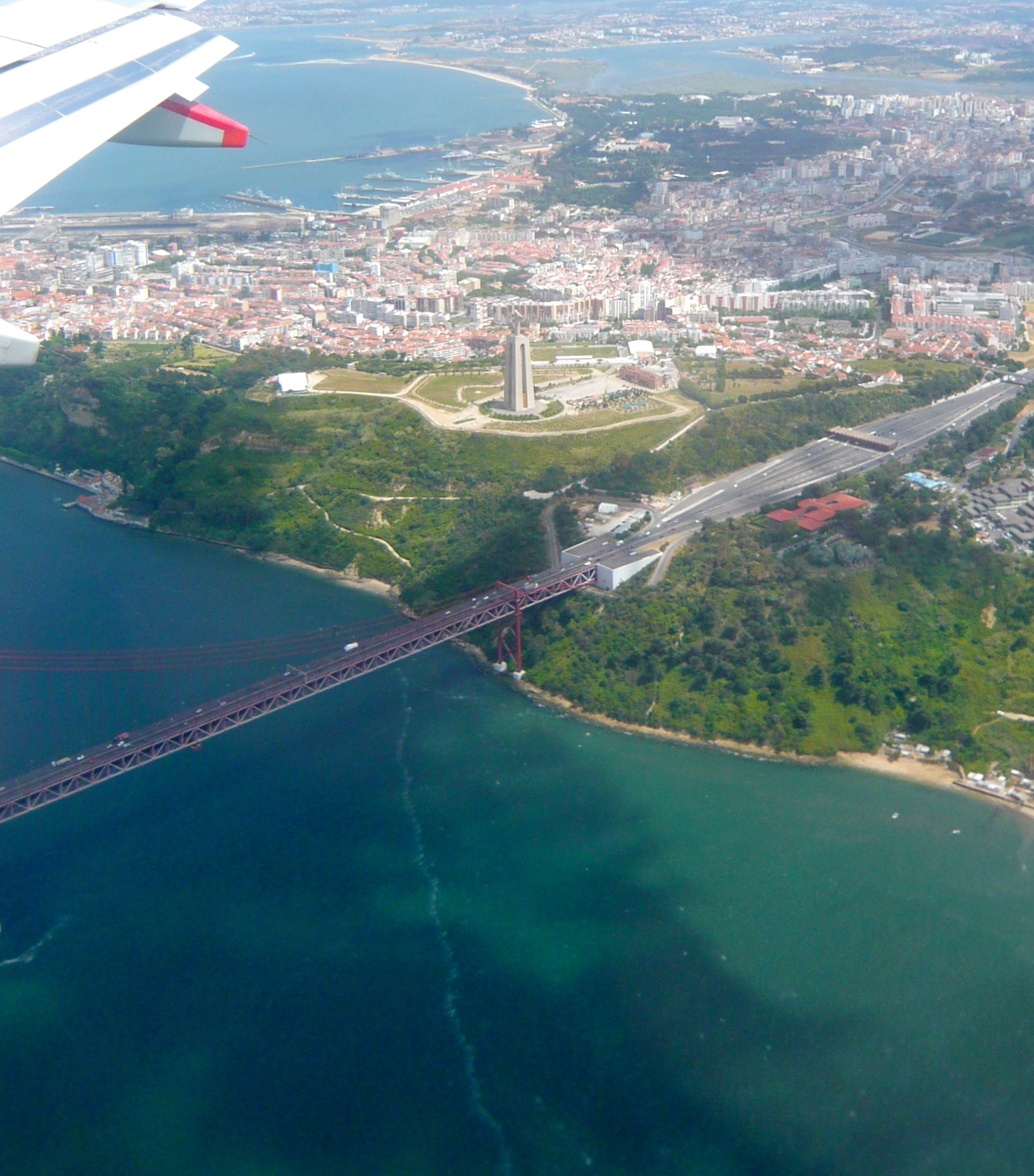
View of Christ the King monument with the Tagus River in the foreground and Almada in the background

In 1941 the land which was used to construct the monument was acquired. In 1949 the cornerstone was finally placed on the site, and managed by the Portuguese Episcopate. Construction began in 1949 and took ten years to complete, funded and supported by Apostleship of Prayer members. Yet it was only in 1952 that the first construction started on the site; at that time the foundations of the monument were established by Empresa de Construções OPCA. The final cost of the complex was of twenty million escudos (20 059 258$40).

The inauguration of the complex officially began on 17 May 1959, and continued throughout the 20th century. On the 25th anniversary of the Shrine in 1984, the Chapel of Our Lady of Peace was first inaugurated. A new plan was approved to recondition the grounds of the Shrine (under the direction of Luiz Cunha and Domingos Ávila Gomes) and also to build a Sanctuary, which included a rectory, a chapel, administration and meeting halls and exhibition galleries.

When Pope Paul VI created the Diocese of Setúbal on 16 July 1975, by means of the Papal bull Studentes Nos, the Monument of Christ the King and the Seminary of Almada remained under the control of the Patriarchate of Lisbon. In June 1999 the site passed under the authority of the Diocese of Setúbal, which immediately started to restore the monument. The municipal authority was responsible for public works, beginning in May 2001 to clean the area and reorganize the public spaces, under technical supervision of the School of Sciences and Technology of the Nova University of Lisbon. Following the restoration projects, the monument was reopened in a solemn ceremony on 1 February 2001. Due to its national importance, the Conference of Bishops determined that funds collected throughout the country on 23 November 2003 would be used for the restoration.

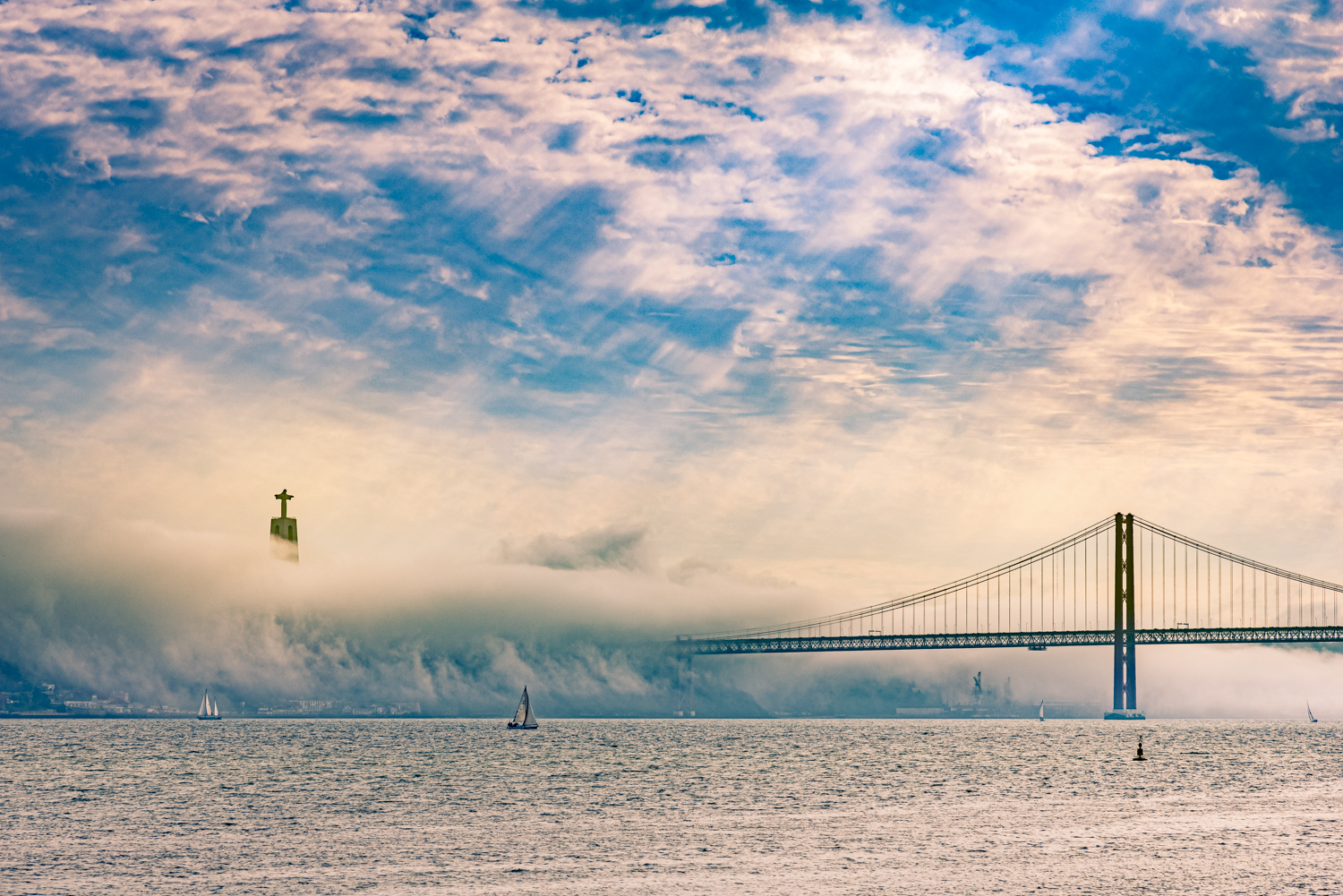
Christ the King view from Lisbon

In order to support pilgrimage to the site, in June 2004 new spaces in the Sanctuary building were inaugurated, including a dining room for 150 people and two segregated dormitories. This was followed on 17 May 2005 by the inauguration of a 150-person dining area and 80-person meeting hall, in addition to two segregated dormitories, dining room and kitchen.

Improvements to the monument and sanctuary of Christ the King began in 2006. By 17 May of that year, the Chapel of Our Lady of Peace was inaugurated, under the supervision of architect João de Sousa Araújo. In the following year (17 May 2007), the Pope John XXIII hall was opened, containing eight oil paintings by the same architect, among them images from the encyclical Pax in Terris and a statue of the Angel of Portugal. Similarly, the old high cross from the Sanctuary of Our Lady of Fatima was donated to the Sanctuary of Christ the King, and unveiled on the same day. On 25 November 2005, the newly remodeled main sacristy in the monument's chapel was reopened. It features the original statue from the monument by sculptor Francisco Franco.

On 17 May 2008, the Chapel of the Confidants in the Heart of Jesus, containing precious reliquaries of St Margaret Mary Alacoque, St John Eudes, St Faustina Kowalska and Blessed Mary of the Divine Heart was inaugurated, along with the Ten Commandments in bronze, which were placed on the main face of the monument.

The inauguration of the Chapel of the Blessed Sacrament (6 January 2009) witnessed the presentation of two paintings related to the revelations made by Margaret Mary Alacoque and another, which was placed above the tabernacle.

Pope Benedict XVI over flew the shrine on the occasion of his apostolic visit to Portugal in May 2010.

=== Porsche controversy ===
In summer 2023, carmaker Porsche controversially digitally removed the statue from footage of Lisbon in their advertisement, with the statue's base still visible. In response to the controversy, Porsche apologized and pulled the advertisement, later replacing it with one that retained the original footage which depicted the Christ the King statue.

== Architecture ==
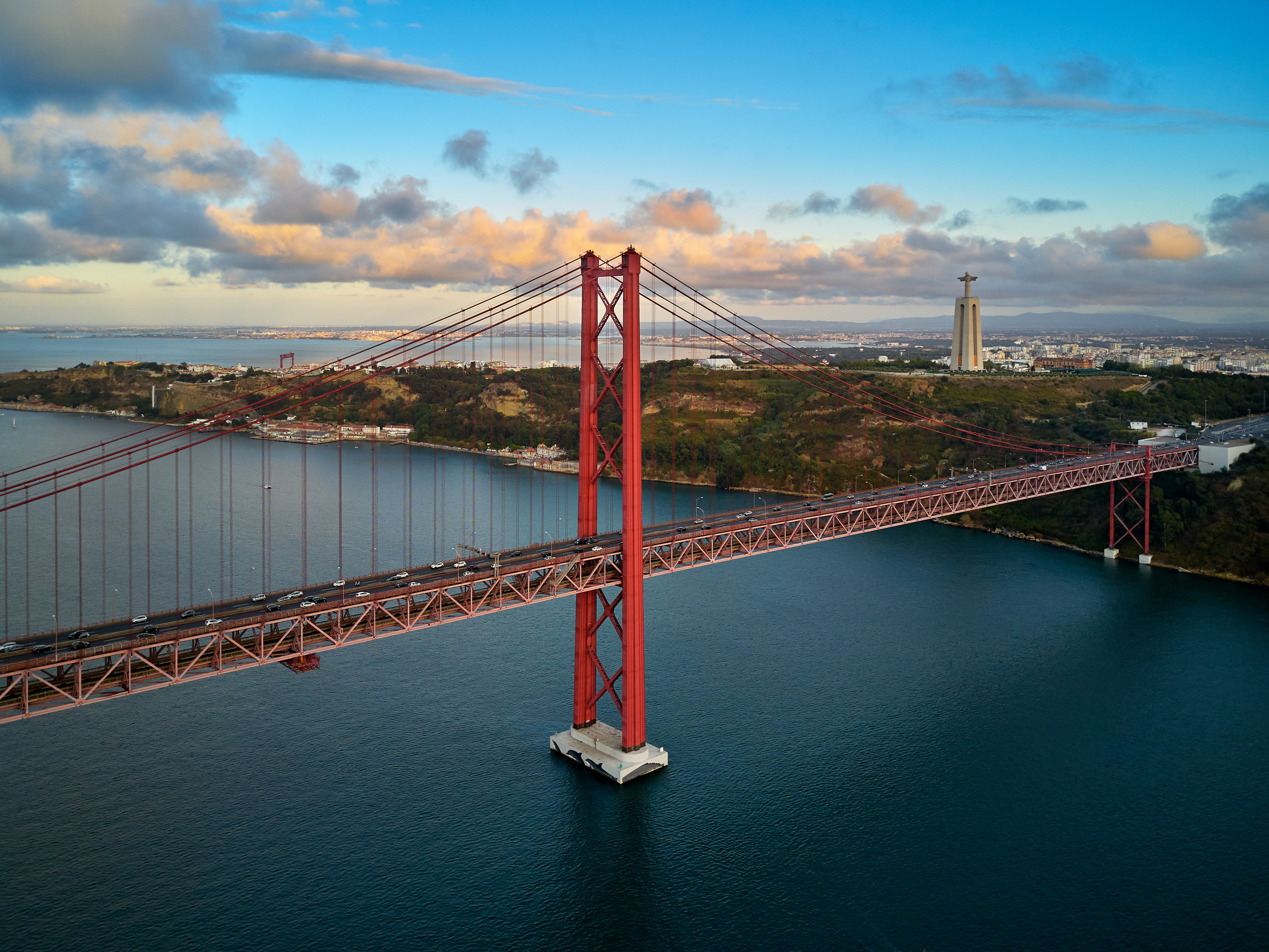
View from the Tagus River

The monument was erected on an isolated clifftop 133 m above the sea, overlooking the Tagus River left bank. It was constructed in the parish of Pragal, which was merged with the parishes of Almada, Cova da Piedade, Pragal e Cacilhas in 2013, into the municipality of Almada. It is the highest point in Almada, on a plateau dominated by the 25 de Abril Bridge, and close to the Estação Elevatória e Reservatório do Pragal. It is accessible from Lisbon by car (over the 25 de Abril Bridge east of the crossing), by train through station in Pragal and by ferry (the Cacilheiro) over the Tagus, through the port of Cacilhas in Almada.

The monument consists of a trapezoidal pedestal of 82 metres (269 ft) height, formed by four arches and a flat platform, supporting the 28 metres (92 ft) image of Christ. Its base was designed by architect António Lino in the form of a gate, while the statue of Christ the King was designed by sculptor Francisco Franco de Sousa. The four arches of the pedestal are oriented in the directions of the compass rose. The figure of Christ, comparable to the Christ the Redeemer statue in Rio de Janeiro, forms a cross, with its arms extended out facing the city of Lisbon, as if to embrace the city. Due to issues of security and safety, the monument was sufficiently distanced from the cliffs on which it predominates.

At the base of the statue is the observation deck, at 82 metres (269 ft), which enables panoramic views of the city of Lisbon, the Tagus River and the 25 de Abril Bridge.

Under the statue, occupying a fifth of the pedestal's height is the Chapel of Our Lady of Peace (Nossa Senhora da Paz) with an entrance from the northern facade. This space is distinctly different with its masonry stone, the northern facade surmounted by cross and the other facades containing narrow doors. Inside two of the pillars is an elevator system with access to the terrace; the statue is 79.30 metres high, and overlooks the Tagus (192 metres above the river).

To the south of the monument is the Sanctuary building, comprising a rectangular body of three wings, with facades covered with masonry brick. In 1987 there was a plan to construct 18 different buildings and spaces around the monument (including a restaurant, lookouts, a commercial complex, a parking area and a sanctuary), of which only a few of these structures were built. The most notable was the construction of the visitors' centre and the Sanctuary building.

=== Interior ===
The interior of the monument is divided into various spaces, among them a library, a bar, two halls and the main chapel. Two religious spaces were dedicated, one to the Chapel of Our Lady of Peace (Portuguese: Capela de Nossa Senhora da Paz) and the other to the Confidants of Jesus (Portuguese: Capela dos Confidentes de Jesus). There are relics exposed for public veneration (of Margaret Mary Alacoque, John Eudes, Faustina Kowalska and Mary of the Divine Heart), relating to the revelations of the Sacred Heart of Jesus).

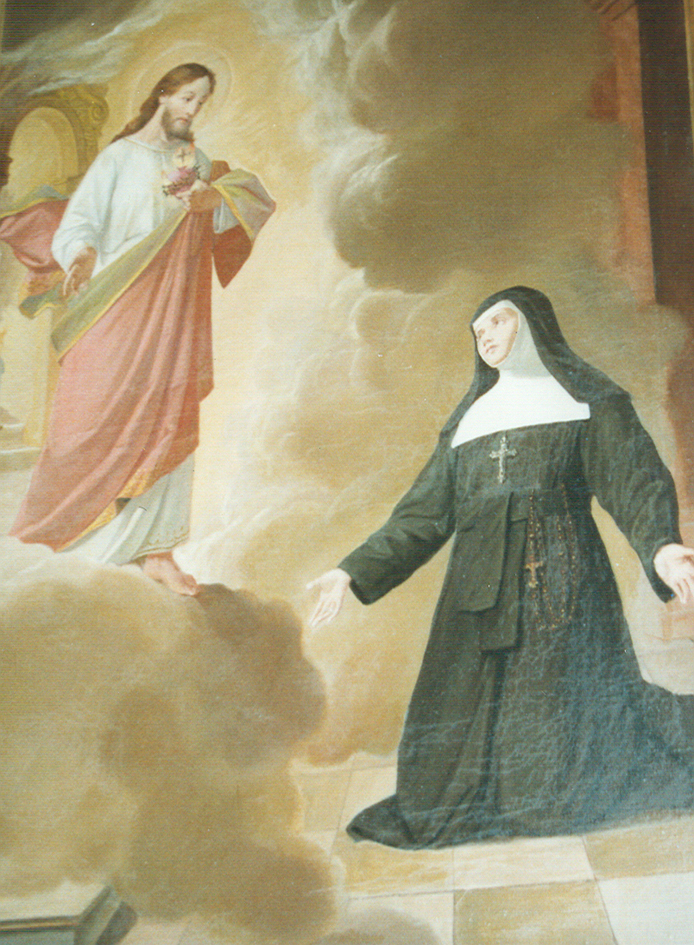
Margaret Mary Alacoque

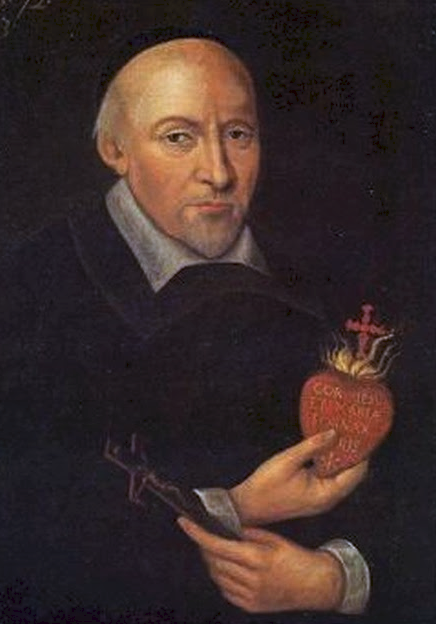
John Eudes

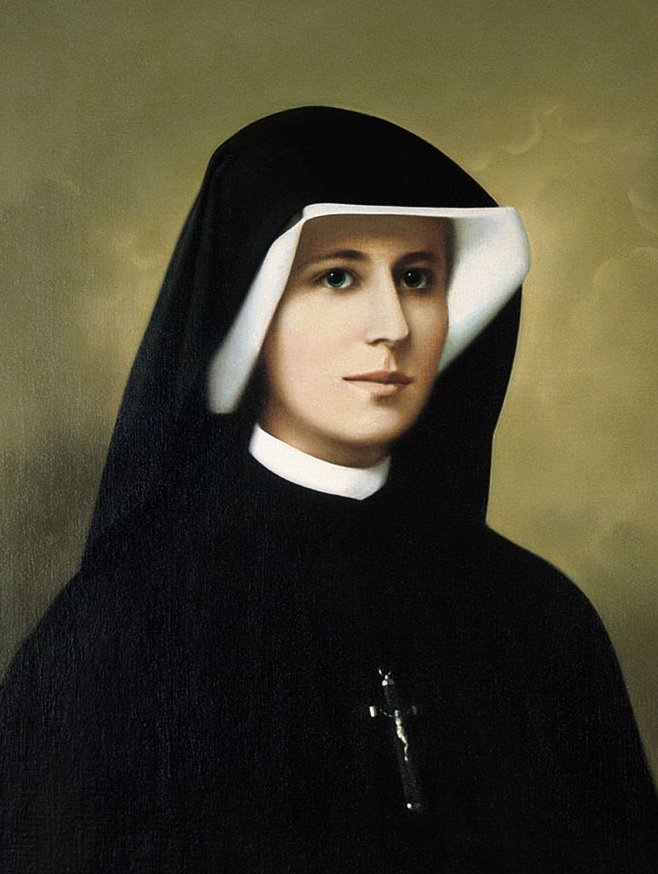
Faustina Kowalska

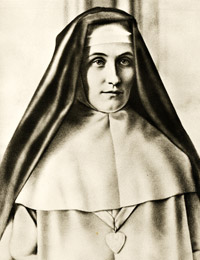
Mary of the Divine Heart

== Gallery ==
Rear view of the monument

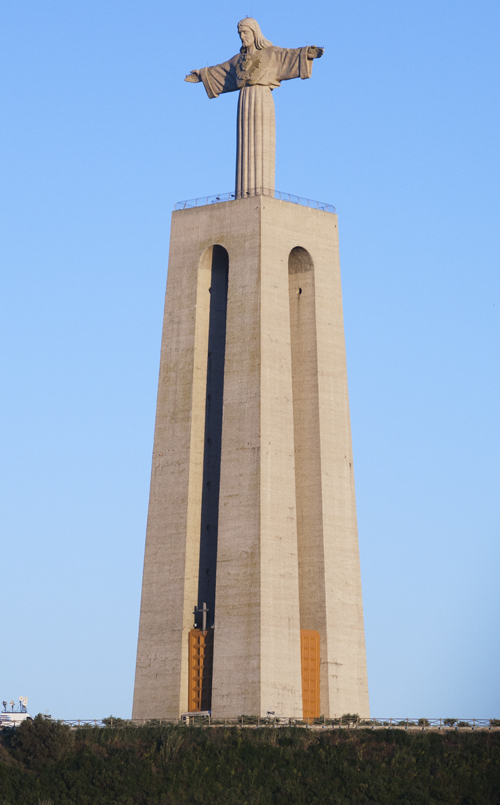
Oblique view of the monument

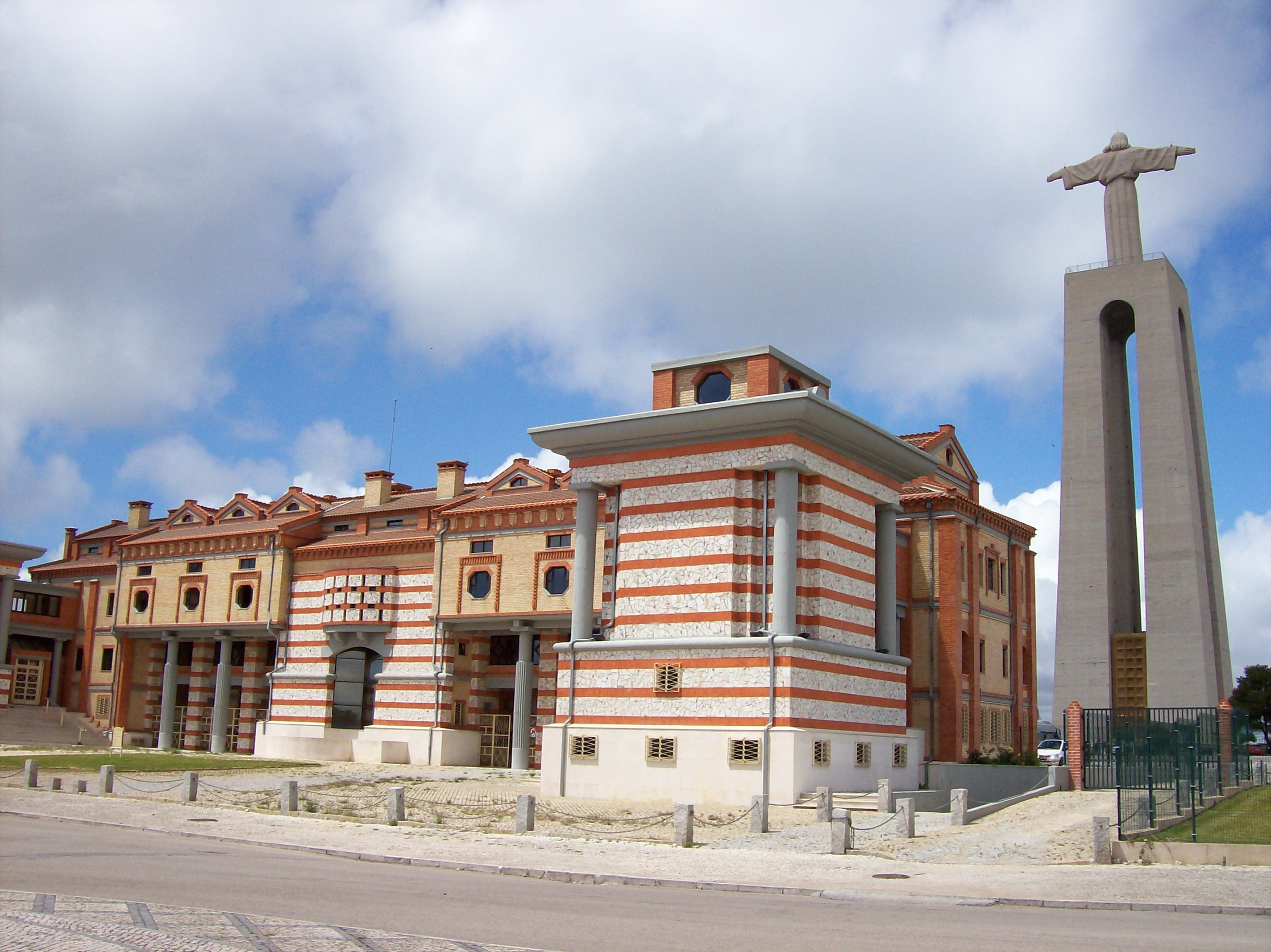
Sanctuary buildings beside the monument

Altar of the Chapel of Our Lady of Peace

Chapel interior facing the entrance

Chapel interior, statue of the Virgin Mary

Station of the Cross overlooking the Tagus

Ponte 25 de Abril and Lisbon viewed from the base of the monument

== See also ==
- Cristo Rei of Dili, a comparable statue in the town of Dili; in the former Portuguese colony of East Timor
- List of statues of Jesus
- List of tallest statues
- List of Christian pilgrimage sites
