= Castle of Almada =

Medieval castle in Cova da Piedade, Setúbal, Portugal

- Castelo de Almada
- Setúbal, Península de Setúbal, Lisbon in Portugal
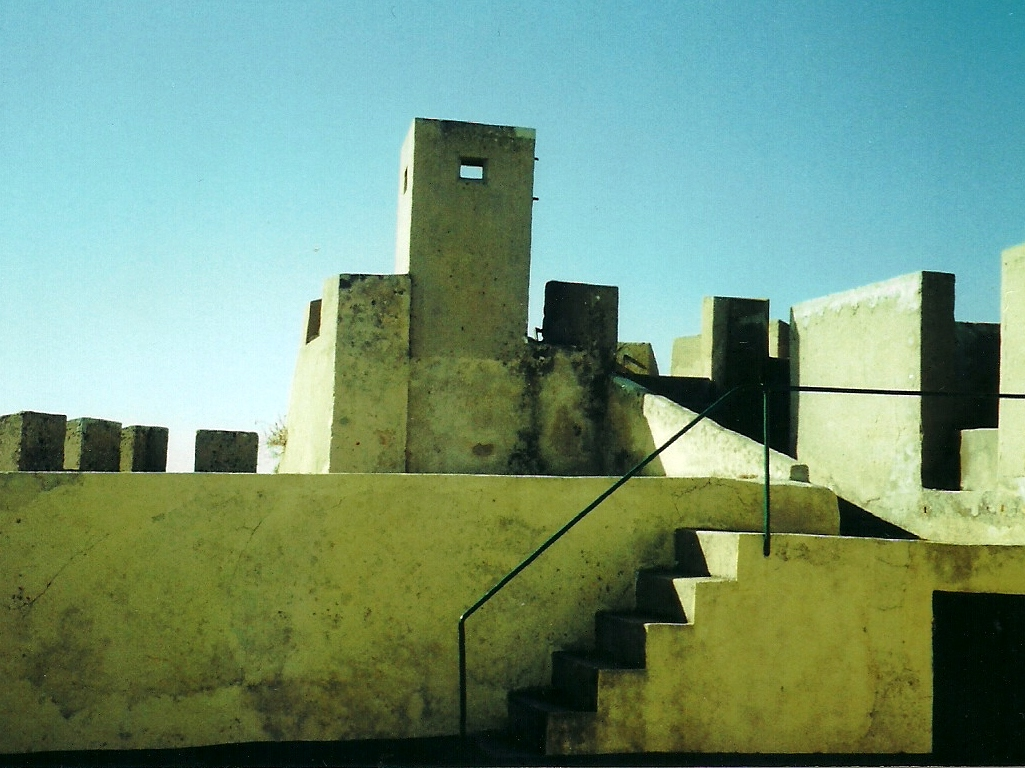
- A view of the tower and battlements of the Castle of Almada

Site information
- Type: Castle
- Owner: Portuguese Republic
- Open to the public: Public

Location
- Location of the castle within the municipality of Almada
- Coordinates: 38°41′5.03″N 9°9′20.8″W

Site history
- Materials: Stone, Granite, Iron, Wood

The Castle of Almada (Portuguese: Castelo de Almada) is a medieval castle located in the civil parish of Almada, Cova da Piedade, Pragal e Cacilhas, in the municipality of Almada, Portuguese Setúbal.

== History ==
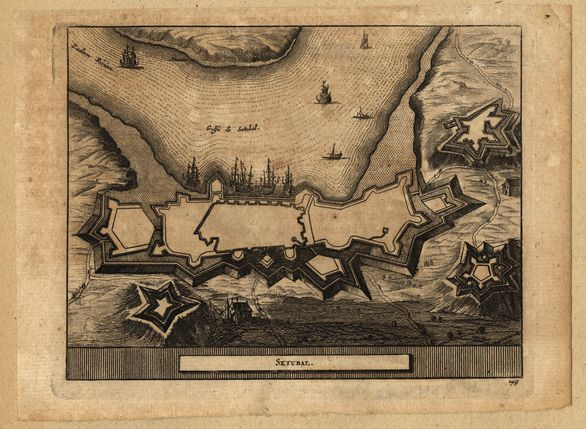
An 18th century sketch of the battlements and fortifications of Setúbal

The castle was founded in a strategic position, on a site settled by Muslim forces during the Iberian occupation, referred to as al-Madan (which means gold mine or silver mine), suggesting that the site was built on mineral extraction in the region or epoch, and referred to in the Geografia Nubiense of Muhammad al-Idrisi (dating to the 12th century. During the Portuguese Reconquista of Lisbon (around 1147), Almada was assaulted and conquered by the combined forces of King D. Afonso and a crusader army. Following its conquest, the settlement's defenses were reinforced and expanded following the foral (charter) issued of 1170.

King D. Sancho I signed a new foral in 1190. During this period, Almohad forces under the command of caliph Abū Yūssuf Yaʿqūb bin Yūssuf al-Manṣūr following their conquest of the Algarve, advanced to the north, expelling Portuguese forces from citadels in Alcácer do Sal and Palmela, and destroyed the defensive lines in Almada (1191). The Portuguese monarch reconquered the fortifications in 1195, and began the construction of a castle on the site. It was only following the battle of Navas de Tolosa (1212), when Christian forces registered a decisive victory over Muslim forces in the Iberian peninsula, that the lost territories were recaptured from the Tagus to Évora.

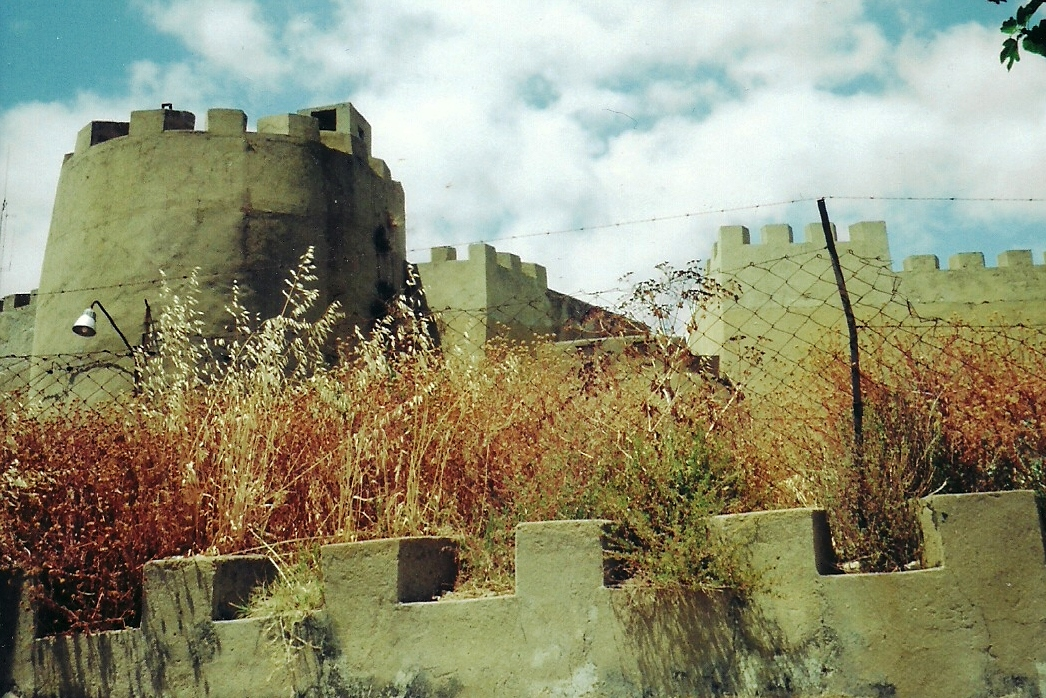
The upper tier of fortifications on the battlements of the Castle of Almada

On 24 February 1255, King D. Afonso III (1248-1279) reconfirmed to the Order of Santiago, in the person of Master Paio Peres Correia and his commander, the control of the castles first donated by D. Sancho I, and later confirmed by Afonso II (1211-1223), namely Alcácer do Sal, Almadar do Sal, Almada, Arruda and Palmela.

The castle was expanded and reinforced during the reign of King D. Dinis I and, later, under the direction of King Ferdinand (1367-1383).

During the succession crisis of 1383-1385, when the city of Lisbon was under siege (1384), Almada was encircled by forces loyal to Castile, by Condestável D. Nuno Álvares Pereira who was unsuccessful in liberating the region.

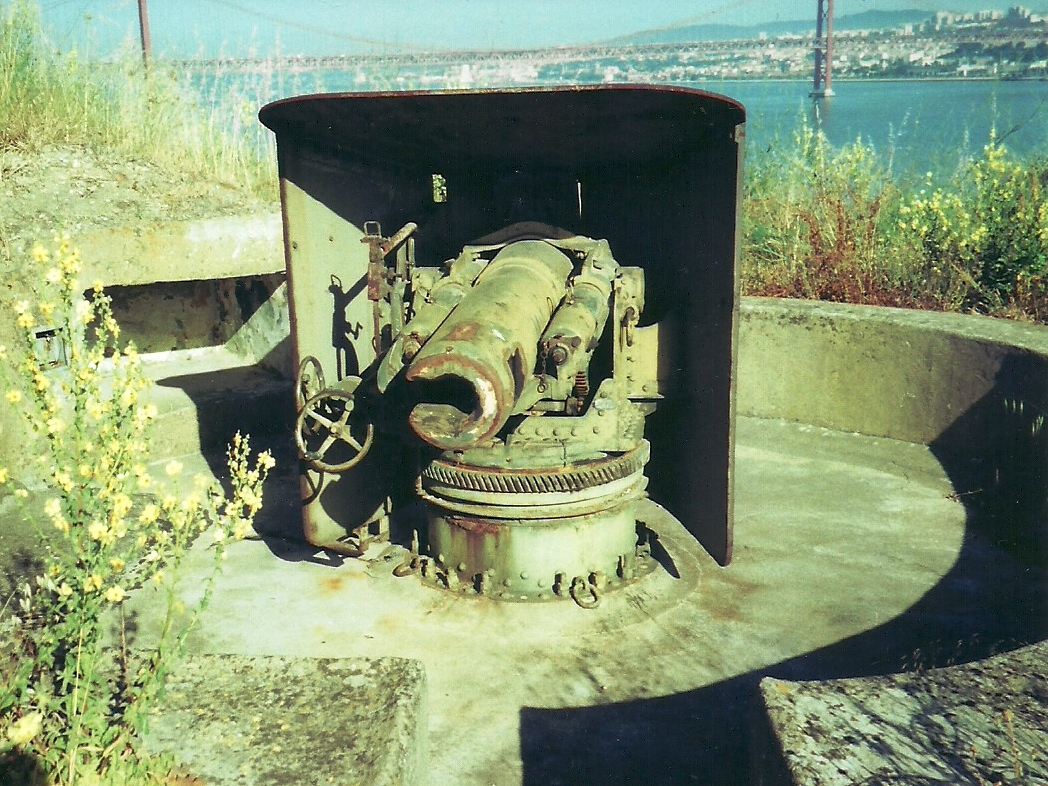
A piece of artillery overlooking the Tagus River

During the reign of King D. Manuel I (1495-1521) a tower was constructed on the south wall of the castle fortifications.

During the context of the Portuguese Restoration War (1640-1668), in the reign of King D. Afonso VI (1656-1683) the town was defended by the old castle, and was rebuilt in order to maintain the defense of Lisbon, resulting in the construction of a line of bastions.

The castle was damaged during the events of the Lisbon earthquake (1 November 1755), but was only reconstructed around 1760, when it acquired its current extent and layout.

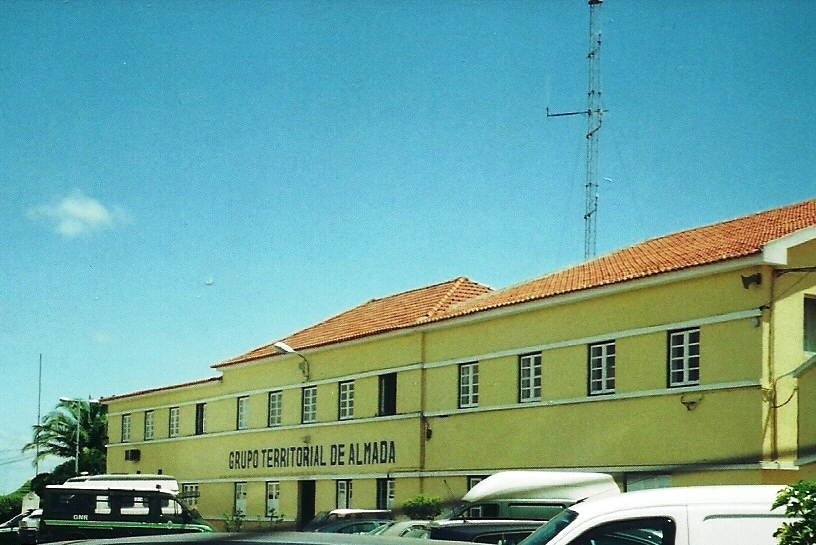
Building of the GNR contingent located in the central courtyard of the former-castle

It was decommissioned in 1825, and Lieutenant Fulgêncio Gomes dos Santos Vale received orders to collect all the arms material onsite, and transfer it the military arsenal in Lisbon. But, the site was garrisoned in 1831, during the context of the Portuguese Civil War (1828-1834). In this period, the site was commanded by Colonel Manuel de Freitas e Paiva. It was visited by King D. Miguel (1828-1834) on 18 February 1832. When Liberals advanced into Lisbon, they defeated Miguelists in the Battle of Cova da Piedade (also known as the Battle of Cacilhas) on 23 June 1833, forcing their retreat to the Castle of Almada. These forces were defeated on the following day.

Between 1865 and 1866 there were repairs completed, in order to coordinate with the various defensive batteries on the southern margin of the Tagus. With the loss of its defensive function, its garrison was reduced and its command assigned to reformist officials, classifying it as a first and second class fort.

In 1868, the public garden was inaugurated, providing landscapes and views of the Tagus.

When the first Portuguese Republic was proclaimed in the country (5 October 1910), it was occupied by Republicans, without any resistance.

During the pandemic of 1918, the site was used to serve as a temporary hospital.

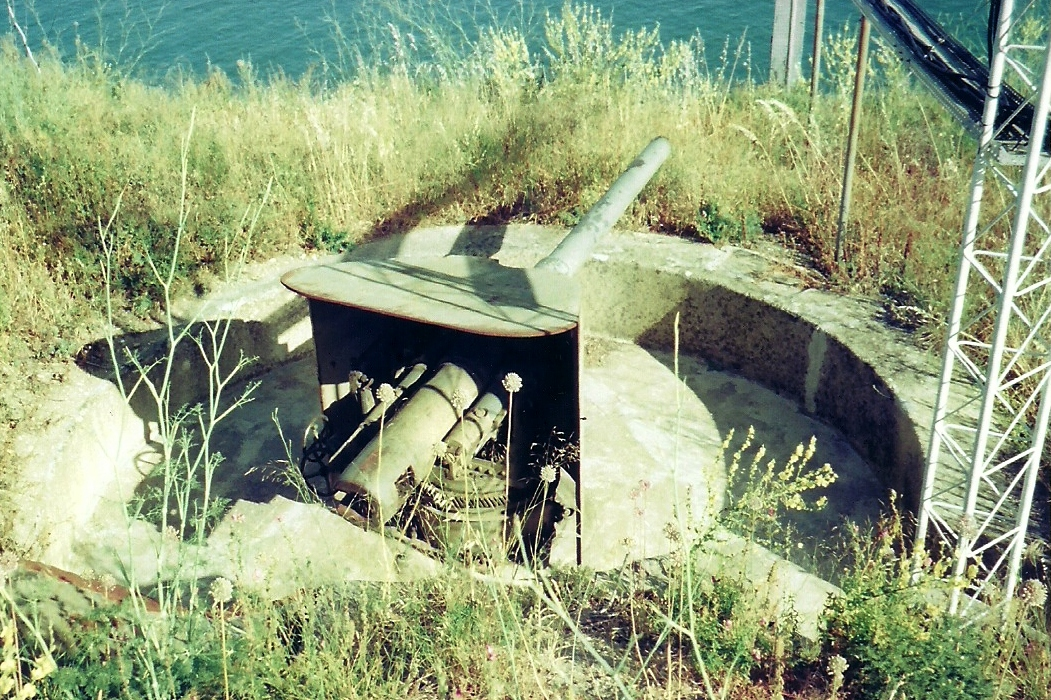
One of the several 20th century artillery pieces on the grounds

Following the 26 August 1931 revolt, the revolutionary airman José Manuel Sarmento de Beires (who along with António Jacinto de Silva Brito Paes, had completed the first aerial flight from Lisbon to Maucau on 2 April 1924) left the air base at Alverca, to bomb the fortification. He failed in this attempt, with his bomb falling in the town square (today Almada Velha), causing the death of three people and injuring many onlookers, including children flying kites in the vicinity. The name of the square was later referred to as the Largo das Vitimas (square of the victims) on 26 August 1931, with an inscription inscribed on a plaque to mark the tragic event and its victims.

During the Second World War, the castle received new artillery. It was garrisoned until the Carnation Revolution, when the garrison revolted on the day of the event. After 1976, the building was renovated and the installations used by the Guarda Nacional Republicana (Republican National Guard).

The public garden was revamped in the 1990s as part of the restoration of the historical centre of Almada Velha undertaken by the municipal authority of Almada.

By the early 21st century, the castle and fortifications hosted a contingent of the Destacamento de Intervenção de Setúbal (Setúbal Intervention Detachment) of the GNR.
