= Serreta =

Serreta may refer to:

- Serreta (Azores), a parish in the Azores, Portugal
- serreta, a type of noseband for horses
