= Serreta Lighthouse =

Lighthouse in Azores, Portugal

Serreta Lighthouse Farol da Ponta da Serreta
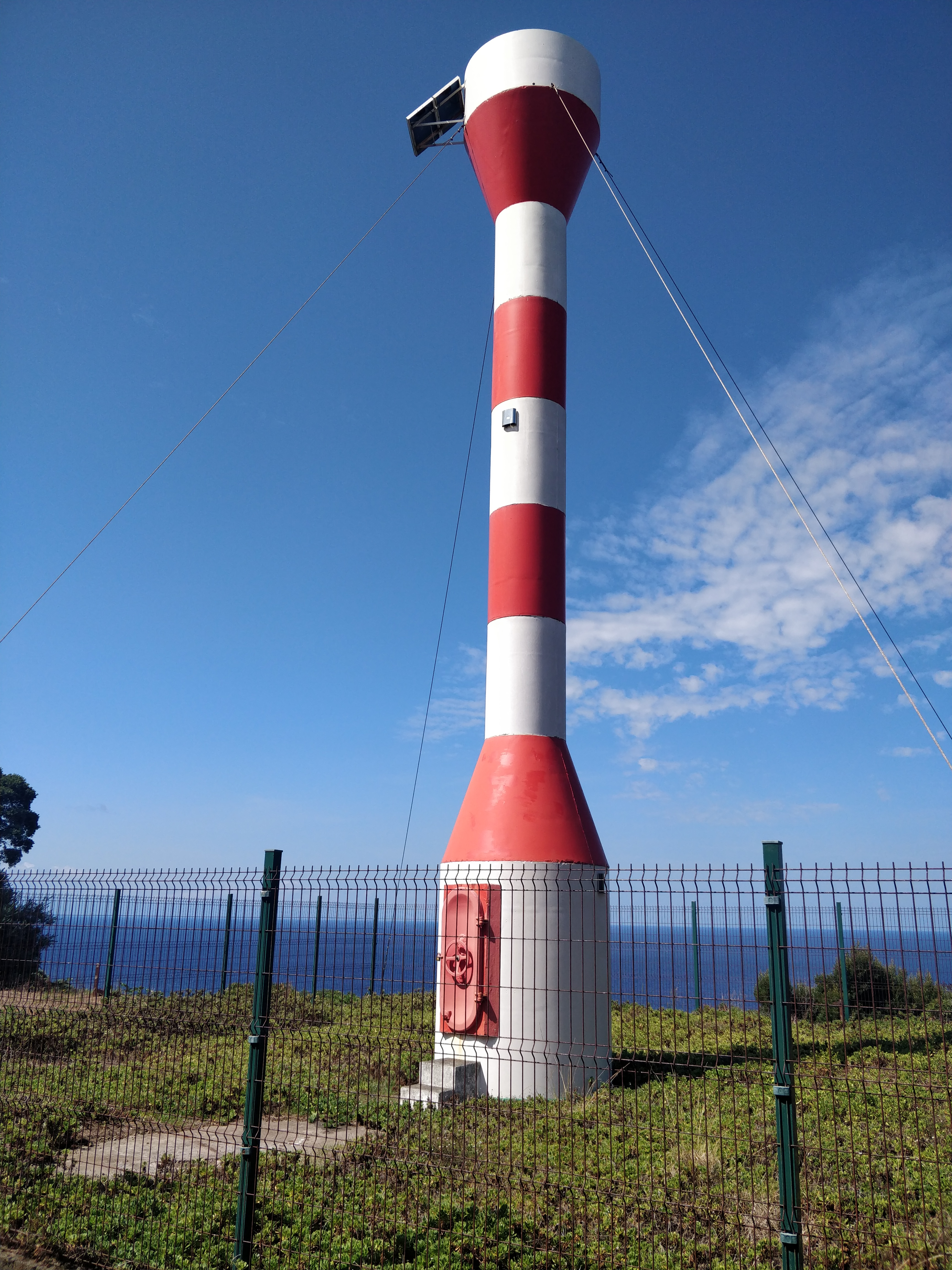
- Serreta Lighthouse
- Location: Serreta, Terceira Island, Azores, Portugal
- Coordinates: 38°45′57″N 27°22′26″W

Tower
- Constructed: 2004 (Existing lighthouse. Original erected 1908)
- Automated: 2004
- Height: 12 metres (39 ft)
- Heritage: heritage without legal protection

Light
- Focal height: 100 m (330 ft)
- Lens: Fifth-order Fresnel
- Range: 12 nautical miles
- Characteristic: Fl W 6s

The Serreta Lighthouse (Farol da Ponta da Serreta or Farol da Serreta), is located on top of a cliff, on the Ponta do Queimado, in the parish of Serreta, on the northwest coast of Terceira Island, in the Azores, Portugal. There have been four different lighthouses on this site, the most recent being a 14-metre-tall white with red horizontal bars fibreglass tower, equipped with a fifth-order optical device, powered by solar energy. It is situated within the Nature Park of Terceira.

== History ==
The "General Plan for Lighting and Marking the Coasts and Maritime Ports of the Mainland of the Kingdom and Adjacent Islands", was presented in 1883 by the Lighthouse and Marking Commission, which had been established in 1881. This envisaged the construction of a lighthouse at Ponta da Serreta (Serreta Point). This document provided for the construction of a lighthouse with a fourth-order lens and a range of 17.5 nautical miles (nm) in moderate weather conditions and 8.5 nm in foggy conditions.

The proposal to install a lighthouse at the westernmost point of Terceira Island was defended by Commander José de Almeida de Ávila, from Faial, in an article published in 1891 entitled "An opinion on the lighting of the Azores archipelago". The idea was adopted in the "Lighthouse Design and Marking Plan for the Adjacent Islands", drawn up in 1902, which identified the exact location and the characteristics of the light required, opting for a fifth-order device showing a white flash followed by a red one every five seconds.

Construction of the lighthouse began in 1907, according to a project drawn up by the engineer Jules Dourot. The work to construct the white, quadrangular masonry tower was carried out by Augusto Alves, a mason, and Jacinto Ferreira, a carpenter. The Serreta Lighthouse began operating on 4 November 1908. It had a focal plane 96 m above mean sea level. The original tower was 11 metres high and was initially equipped with a fifth-order rotating catadioptric device, with a focal length of 187.5 mm, which had a constant-level lamp as its light source. The rotation was produced by a clockwork machine. The optical device was replaced in 1935 by a fourth-order one and in 1947 the light source was changed to an incandescent lamp powered by petroleum vapour, giving the lighthouse a range of 25 nautical miles. It was electrified in 1958 through the installation of two diesel generator sets, and the light source was changed to a 3000 W electric incandescent lamp, giving a light range of 30 nautical miles. In 1960, due to its poor condition, the optics were replaced by a fourth-order one, which had been removed from the Lighthouse of Ponta de Sagres in the Algarve on the Portuguese mainland.

The access road to the lighthouse was opened when the lighthouse was built. It often became impassable after heavy rains. In 1968, a single-lane, tarred access road to the lighthouse was built, connecting it to the road that runs around the island. The road now goes beyond the lighthouse, taking tourists down to a sea level viewpoint.

During an earthquake on 1 January 1980, the lighthouse and the keepers' houses were damaged. Cracks in the lighthouse led to the loss of 2.5 kg of mercury, although it remained in operation. The following year, four prefabricated houses were temporarily installed to house the lighthouse keepers. Plans to restore the tower were abandoned in 1982 as they were considered too expensive. As an alternative, at the end of 1983, the old 12-metre cylindrical iron tower of the extinct Cacilhas Lighthouse, just south of the capital Lisbon on the opposite bank of the Tagus estuary, was moved to Terceira. The Cacilhas light had been deactivated on 18 May 1978 due to the construction of the new passenger ferry terminal and because it served little use as an aid to navigation.

The original lighthouse was demolished, a small temporary lighthouse was installed and began to operate in 1983, with a sixth-order light, while the tower brought from Cacilhas was assembled. The assembly work was completed in 1986 and a new fifth-order optical device was installed. The tower was 15 metres high. In 1987 the lighthouse was remodelled and automated using the SIRIUS system, and began to operate with solar energy, with a generator set being kept as a reserve. In 2000, the SIRIUS system was replaced by the ELCO-12 system.

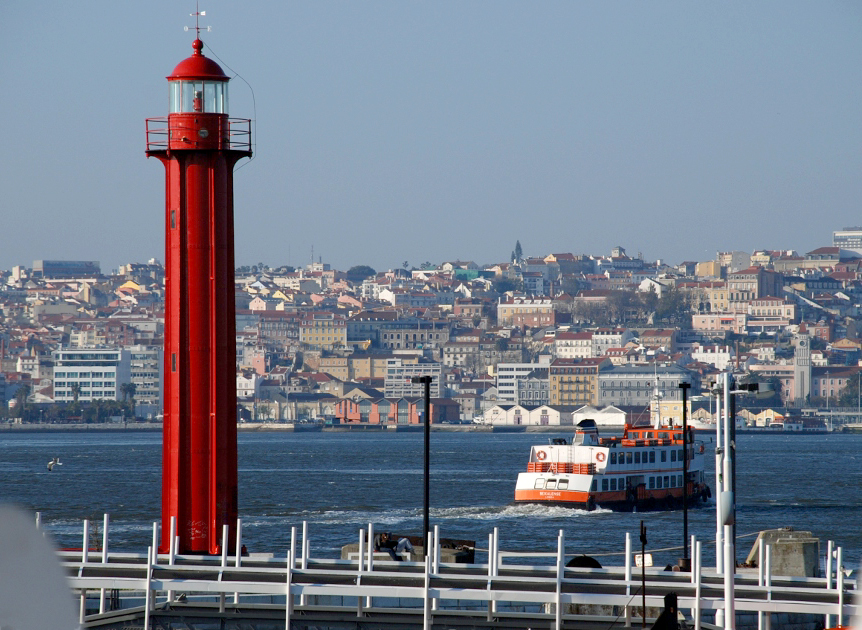
The Cacilhas lighthouse after its return to its original site

In 2001, the Almada City Council, of which Cacilhas is a part, requested the Directorate of Lighthouses to return the tower. It was disassembled in the first quarter of 2004, and re-erected close to its original site in Cacilhas in 2009. Not used as a lighthouse, it is now considered part of the Almada Naval Museum. It was replaced at Serreta by a 14-metre fibreglass tower, which is white with red stripes and equipped with a fifth-order optical device, also powered by solar energy, emitting a white flash every six seconds, with a range of 12 nautical miles.

== See also ==
- List of lighthouses in Portugal
