= Cova da Piedade =

- Civil parish
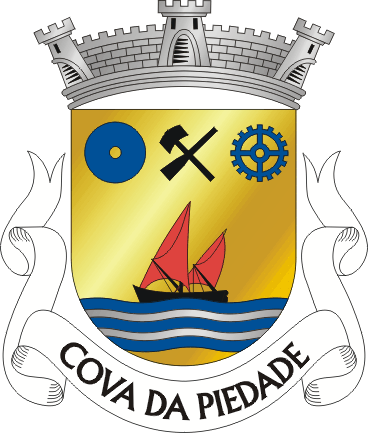
- Coat of arms

- Location in Portugal
- Coordinates: 38.674°N 9.156°W
- Country: Portugal
- Region: Lisbon
- Metropolitan area: Lisbon
- District: Setúbal
- Municipality: Almada
- Disbanded: 2013

Area
  - Total: 1.42 km^{2} (0.55 sq mi)

Population (2011)
  - Total: 19,904
  - Density: 14,000/km^{2} (36,000/sq mi)
- Time zone: UTC+00:00 (WET)
  - Summer (DST): UTC+01:00 (WEST)
- Postal code: 2805
- Website: www.jf-covadapiedade.pt

Cova da Piedade (European Portuguese: [ˈkɔvɐ ðɐ pjɛˈðaðɨ]) is a former civil parish in the municipality of Almada, Lisbon metropolitan area, Portugal. In 2013, the parish merged into the new parish Almada, Cova da Piedade, Pragal e Cacilhas. The population in 2011 was 19,904, in an area of 1.42 km^{2}. The parish was founded on February 7, 1928.

== Sites of interest ==
- Fábrica de Moagem do Caramujo
- Palacete António José Gomes

== Famous people from Cova da Piedade ==
- Luís Figo

== Historic events ==
- Battle of Cova da Piedade (1833)
