= Pragal =

- Civil parish
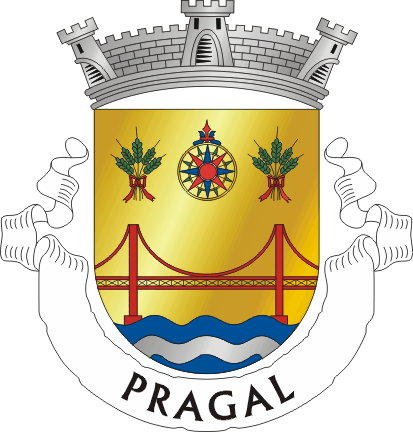
- Coat of arms

- Location in Portugal
- Coordinates: 38.667°N 9.179°W
- Country: Portugal
- Region: Lisbon
- Metropolitan area: Lisbon
- District: Setúbal
- Municipality: Almada
- Disbanded: 2013

Area
  - Total: 2.27 km^{2} (0.88 sq mi)

Population (2011)
  - Total: 7,156
  - Density: 3,150/km^{2} (8,160/sq mi)
- Time zone: UTC+00:00 (WET)
  - Summer (DST): UTC+01:00 (WEST)
- Website: http://www.jf-pragal.pt

Pragal is a former civil parish in the municipality of Almada, Lisbon metropolitan area, Portugal. In 2013, the parish merged into the new parish Almada, Cova da Piedade, Pragal e Cacilhas. The population in 2011 was 7,156, in an area of 2.27 km^{2}.

Overlooking the Tagus river and the 25 de Abril Bridge, the famous Sanctuary of Christ the King is in Pragal.
