= Battle of Cova da Piedade =

The Battle of Cova da Piedade, or Battle of Cacilhas or Battle of Almada, fought on 23 July 1833, was a battle of the Portuguese Civil War between the Liberal forces of Dom Pedro, ex-Emperor of Brazil and Regent for his daughter Maria da Glória, and the Absolutist army of his brother the King Dom Miguel. The Liberal forces were victorious and occupied Lisbon the next day.

== The battle ==
In June 1833, the Liberal forces had been bottled up and besieged in Porto for a year, while the Absolutists remained in control of the rest of Portugal. So it was decided to send a force commanded by the Duke of Terceira over the sea to the Algarve. This force was escorted by a naval squadron commanded by Charles Napier.

The Duke of Terceira landed near Faro and marched north through the Alentejo The Absolutists hastily gathered some forces to stop his advance towards the capital. Both armies clashed at Cova da Piedade, near Cacilhas. The Liberal army was able to push back the Absolutists, which entrenched themselves in the Castle of Almada.
The next day, the castle was taken by the Liberals and the leader of the Absolutists, General Teles Jordão, was killed.

The way to Lisbon now lay open for the Liberal army and they occupied the city without any further opposition.

== Sources ==
Almada virtual museum
