= 25 de Abril Bridge =

Suspension bridge in Lisbon, Portugal

Ponte 25 de Abril
- Aerial view of the bridge, August 2017
- Coordinates: 38°41′21″N 09°10′37″W
- Carries: Six road lanes of IP 7 A 2 Two railway tracks of Linha do Sul
- Crosses: Tagus River
- Locale: Lisbon (right/North bank); Pragal (left/South bank)
- Official name: Ponte 25 de Abril
- Other name(s): Ponte Salazar (before 1974); Tagus River Bridge
- Named for: Carnation Revolution
- Maintained by: Lusoponte

Characteristics
- Design: Suspension
- Total length: 3,173 metres (10,410 ft)
- Width: 24.5 metres (80 ft)
- Height: 180 metres (590 ft)
- Longest span: 1,012.9 m (3,323 ft)
- Clearance below: 70 m (230 ft) at mean high water

History
- Constructed by: American Bridge Company
- Opened: 6 August 1966

Statistics
- Daily traffic: 150,000 cars 157 trains
- Toll: 2.15 € (northbound only)

Location
- Interactive map of Ponte 25 de Abril

The 25 de Abril Bridge (Portuguese: Ponte 25 de Abril, 25th of April Bridge, Portuguese pronunciation: [ˈpõtɨ ˈvĩtɨ (i) ˈsĩku dɨ ɐˈbɾil]) is a suspension bridge connecting the city of Lisbon, capital of Portugal, with the municipality of Almada on the left (south) bank of the Tagus River. It has a main span length of 1,013 metres (3,323 ft; 1.013 km), making it the 56th longest suspension bridge in the world.

At the time of its inauguration in 1966, the bridge was named Salazar Bridge (Ponte Salazar), after the Portuguese dictator António de Oliveira Salazar, who ordered its construction. After the Carnation Revolution in 1974, which overthrew the remnants of Salazar's Estado Novo regime, the bridge was renamed for April 25, the date of the revolution. It is also commonly called the Tagus River Bridge (in Portuguese: Ponte sobre o Tejo, lit. "bridge over the Tagus").

Later changes had to be made due to the rapid increase in population. In the 1990s, a fifth car lane was added, and in 1999, a lower deck, used as a railway track, which was planned since the beginning, was finally built. Today, the upper deck carries six car lanes while the lower deck carries a double track railway, electrified at 25 kV AC.

== History ==
=== Construction ===
From the late 19th century, there had been proposals to build a bridge across the Tagus. In 1929, the idea advanced when the Portuguese engineer and entrepreneur António Bello requested a government concession for a railway crossing between Lisbon and Montijo (where the Vasco da Gama Bridge, the second bridge serving Lisbon, was later built in 1998). As a result, the Minister of Public Works, Duarte Pacheco, created a commission in 1933 to analyse the request. The commission reported in 1934, and proposed building a road and rail bridge. Bids were obtained, but the proposal was subsequently put aside in favor of a bridge crossing the river at Vila Franca de Xira, 35 kilometres (22 mi) north of Lisbon.

In 1953, a new government commission started work and, in 1958, recommended building the bridge, choosing the southern anchor point adjacent to the recently built Christ the King monument (Cristo-Rei). In 1959, the international invitation to tender for the project received four bids. In 1960, the winner was announced as a consortium headed by the United States Steel Export Company, which had also submitted a bid in 1935. The American School of Lisbon was founded largely to educate the children of the American engineers brought to Portugal to work on the construction of the bridge.

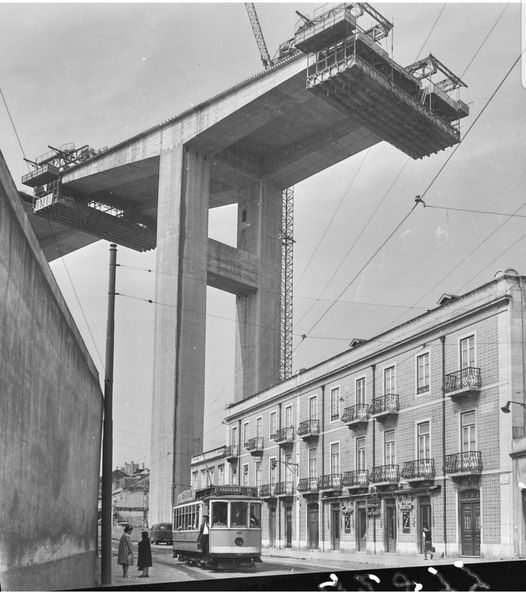
The bridge in construction, May 1964

Construction began on 5 November 1962. Forty-five months later, six months ahead of schedule, the bridge was inaugurated on 6 August 1966. Presiding at the ceremony was the President of Portugal, Admiral Américo Thomaz. Also present were the Prime-Minister, António de Oliveira Salazar, and the Patriarch of Lisbon, Cardinal Manuel Gonçalves Cerejeira. The bridge was named Salazar Bridge (Ponte Salazar), after Prime Minister Salazar.

United States Steel International Inc., based in New York, was prime contractor for the bridge. Morrison-Knudsen of Portugal Ltd., an American firm based in Boise, Idaho, was U.S. Steel's principal associate. Morrison-Knudsen had previously worked on the San Francisco Bay Bridge. The bridge was designed by Steinman, Boynton, Gronquist and London of New York, and Tudor Engineering Company of San Francisco. The steel was imported from the US. Four workers died, out of a total of 3,000 who worked on the site. Construction took a total of 2,185,000 man-hours of work. The total cost of the bridge came to 2.2 billion Portuguese escudos, or US$32 million (US$225 million in 2011 adjusted for inflation).

Soon after the Carnation Revolution in 1974, the bridge was renamed the "25 de Abril Bridge", the day the revolution had occurred. A symbol of those times was captured on film, with citizens removing the large brass letters spelling "Salazar" from one of the main pillars of the bridge and painting a provisional "25 de Abril" in its place.

=== Expansion ===
Sound of cars driving on 25 de Abril bridge

The upper platform, running 70 m (230 ft) above water, had four car lanes, two in each direction, with a dividing guardrail. On 23 July 1990, the guardrail was removed and a fifth, reversible lane was created. On 6 November 1998, the side walls were extended and reinforced to make space for the present six lanes. Cars crossing the bridge make a peculiar hum - listen (59s) - because the two inner lanes are made of metallic grating rather than asphalt to minimize aerodynamic forces by means of pressure equalization.

Since 30 June 1999, the lower platform has carried a double track railway. To accommodate that, the bridge underwent extensive structural reinforcements, including a second set of main cables, placed above the original set, and the main towers were increased in height. The railway had been part of the initial design, but was eliminated for economy, so the initial structure was lightened. The original builder American Bridge Company was called again for the job, performing the first aerial spinning of additional main cables on a loaded, fully operational suspension bridge.

Traffic soon increased well beyond predictions, and has remained at maximum capacity despite the enlargement from four to six lanes, the addition of the railway, and the building of a second bridge serving Lisbon, the Vasco da Gama Bridge.

A third bridge has been on and off government plans for some time, but in May 2024 the government announced to prioritize building this new bridge as part of the new Lisbon-Madrid high-speed rail line, to be finalized in 2034.

== Popular culture ==
Several movies have been filmed on the bridge, including some scenes in the 1969 James Bond film On Her Majesty's Secret Service when James Bond is in a car driving across a bridge with Marc Ange Draco's henchmen, and it is also featured near the end of the movie when Bond marries Tracy and drives across the bridge with her in Bond's Aston Martin.

Normally, pedestrians cannot walk across the bridge, but every year there is a half-marathon that starts on the south bank and finishes in the north bank (Belem).

In September 2017, an observation deck was built allowing people to go to the platform.

== Tolls ==
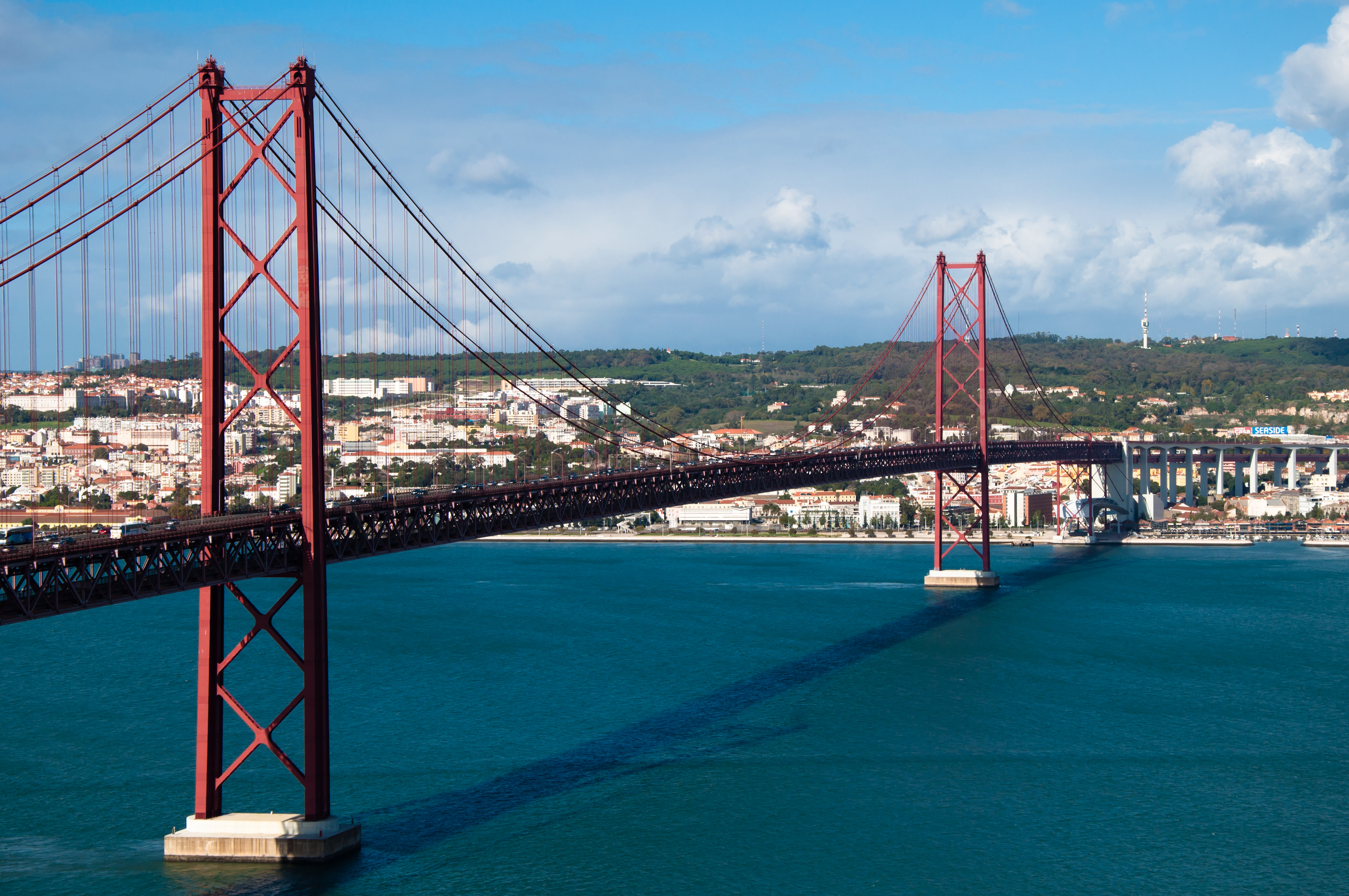
View from Almada

Using the bridge has always incurred a toll, first in both directions and then, from 1993, while travelling northbound only. The toll plaza situated on the south bank of the Tagus River. The tolls have become a source of political dispute in recent years. The bridge was projected to have paid all debt in 20 years, and to become toll-free (or have a reduced toll) after that period. However, the Government kept charging tolls well beyond the 20-year period, until it gave the concession to Lusoponte, creating a monopoly of the Tagus crossing in Lisbon.

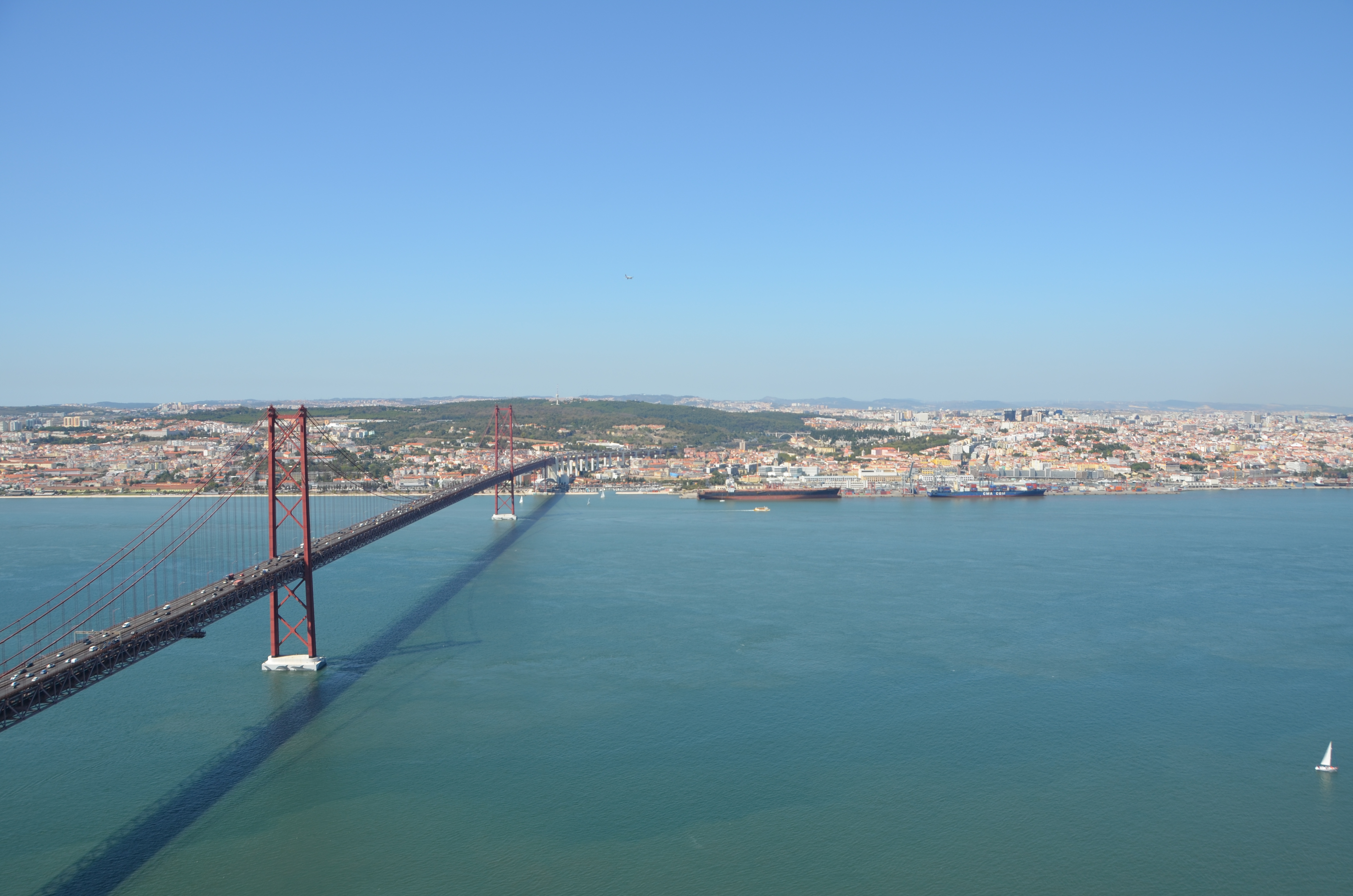
View along with Lisbon

When opened, people had to park their car and walk to buy a toll ticket costing 20 escudos. On 14 June 1994, the government, which ran the bridge at the time, raised the toll by 50%, from 100 to 150 escudos, to prepare to give the bridge into private concession for 40 years from 1 January 1996. The concessionaire was Lusoponte, a private consortium formed to build the Vasco da Gama Bridge at no cost to the public finances in exchange for tolls from both bridges. As a result, a popular uprising led to road blockades of the bridge and consequent police charges, an event which made the right-wing Government highly unpopular and which many believe led to a centre-left win in the 1995 general elections. The toll is set at €2.15 for passenger cars (as of September 2025), northbound (into Lisbon). There is no toll southbound, and until 2010, no tolls were collected during the month of August. From 2011 on, the Portuguese Government abolished that exception, in order to help the efforts to reduce the budget deficit.

Assuming that no legal changes happen, the concession will end on 24 March 2030, after which the bridge will again be state-managed.

== Design ==
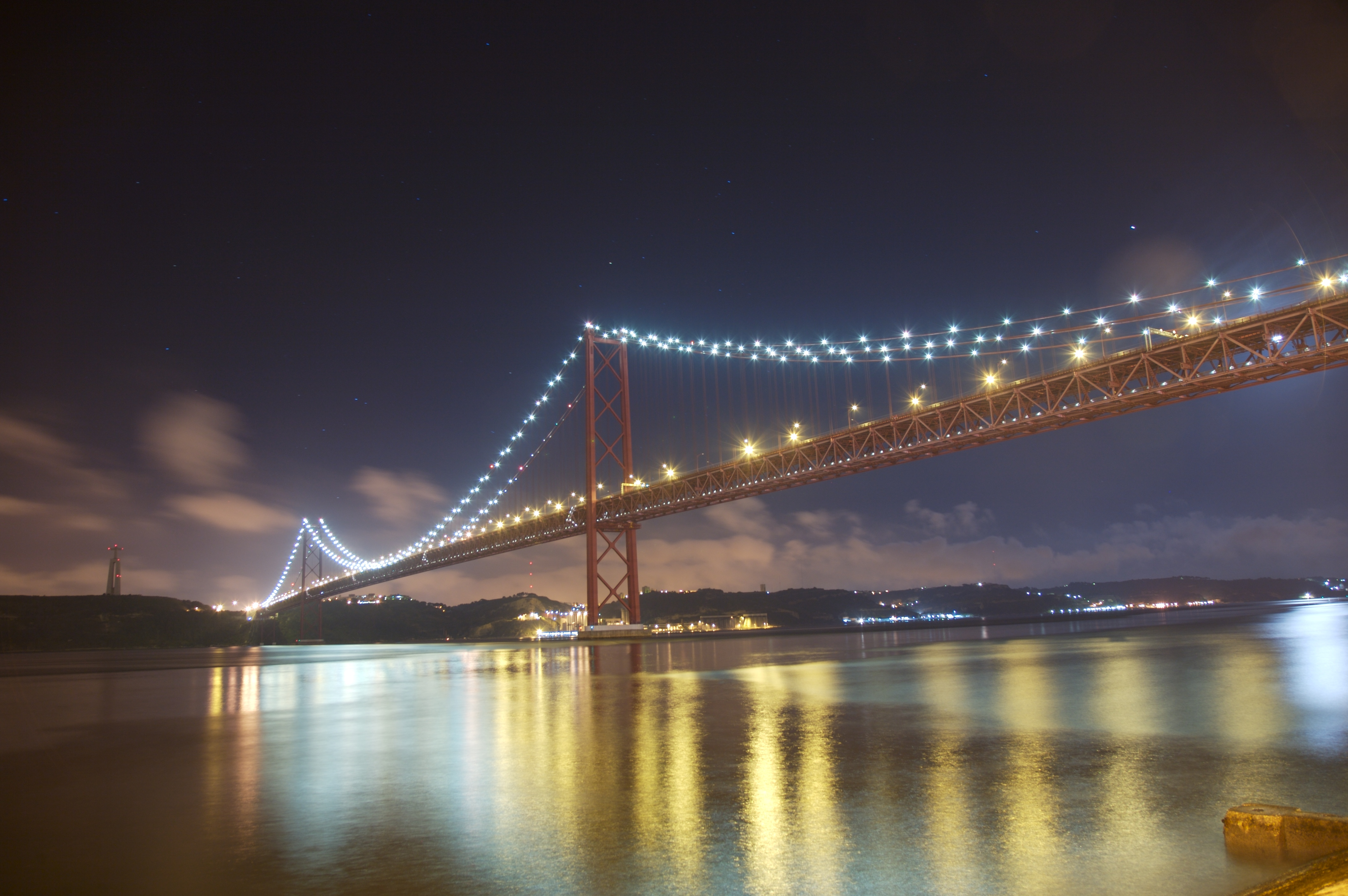
The 25 de Abril Bridge at night.

The 25 de Abril Bridge is based in part on two San Francisco Bay Area bridges. Its paint is the same International Orange color as the famous Golden Gate Bridge, and the design is similar as well to the San Francisco–Oakland Bay Bridge. Both the Bay Bridge and the 25 de Abril Bridge were built by the same company. The American Society of Civil Engineers says: "Like its sister bridge, the SFOBB in San Francisco, the Tagus River Bridge is located in an area with a long history of earthquakes" and seismic data had to be taken into account in its construction. Another sister bridge is the Forth Road Bridge in Edinburgh.

Upon completion, the bridge had the longest suspended span and the longest main span in Continental Europe, the world's longest continuous truss, and the world's deepest bridge foundation. It was the fifth-longest suspension bridge in the world, and the longest outside the US.

== Numbers ==
As of 2006, a daily average of 150,000 cars cross the bridge, including 7,000 during the peak hour. Rail traffic is also heavy, with a daily average of 157 trains. In all, around 380,000 people cross the bridge daily.

Other numbers:

- 1,012.9 m (3,323 ft 2 in) – length of main span
- 3,173 m (10,410 ft; 2 mi) – length of truss
- 70 m (229.7 ft) – height from water to upper platform
- 190.47 m (624 ft 11 in) – height of main towers (seventh tallest structure in Portugal)
- 58.6 cm (1 ft 11.1 in) – diameter of each of the two sets of main cables
- 11,248 – number of steel wire strand cables, each 4.87 mm (0.192 in) in diameter, in each set of main cables
- 54,196 km (33,676 mi) – length of steel wire strand cables making up the two sets of main cables
- 79.3 m (260 ft 2 in) – depth (below water-level) of the foundation of the south pillar
- 30 km (19 mi) – length of access roads
- 32 – viaducts in the access roads

== See also ==
- Vasco da Gama Bridge, another notable span serving Lisbon
- Fertagus, trains

== Bibliography ==
RODRIGUES, Luís Ferreira (2016). A ponte inevitável: a história da Ponte 25 de Abril. Lisboa: Guerra e Paz
