= Boca do Vento Elevator =

Elevator in Almada, Portugal

- Elevador da Boca do Vento
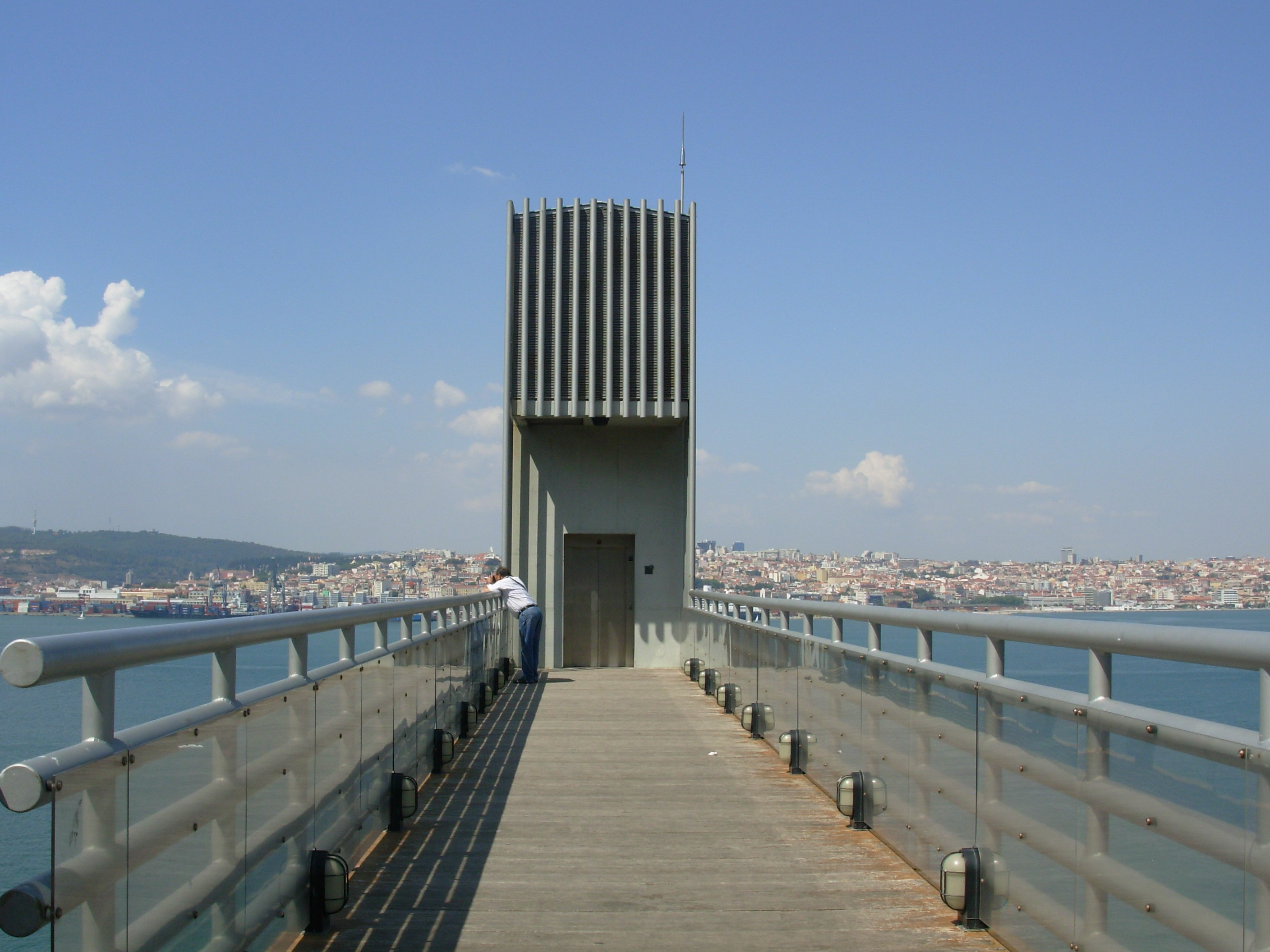
- The main lookout and platform along the Almada Velha
- Interactive map of the Boca do Vento Elevator area

General information
- Type: Elevator
- Location: Almada, Cova da Piedade, Pragal e Cacilhas, Portugal
- Coordinates: 38°41′4.8″N 9°9′31.7″W
- Owner: Portuguese Republic

Technical details
- Material: Mixed masonry

Design and construction
- Architects: José Aurélio; Fidalgo Mineiro; Helena Moreira; Anabela Felícia

The Boca do Vento Elevator (Portuguese: Elevador da Boca do Vento), is a public elevator in the municipality of Almada, in Portugal. Opening to the public in 2000, it was designed by Portuguese sculptor José Aurélio and architects Fidalgo Mineiro, Helena Moreira and Anabela Felícia.

== History ==
Construction of the elevator began in 1999 and took about a year. It was inaugurated in 2000.

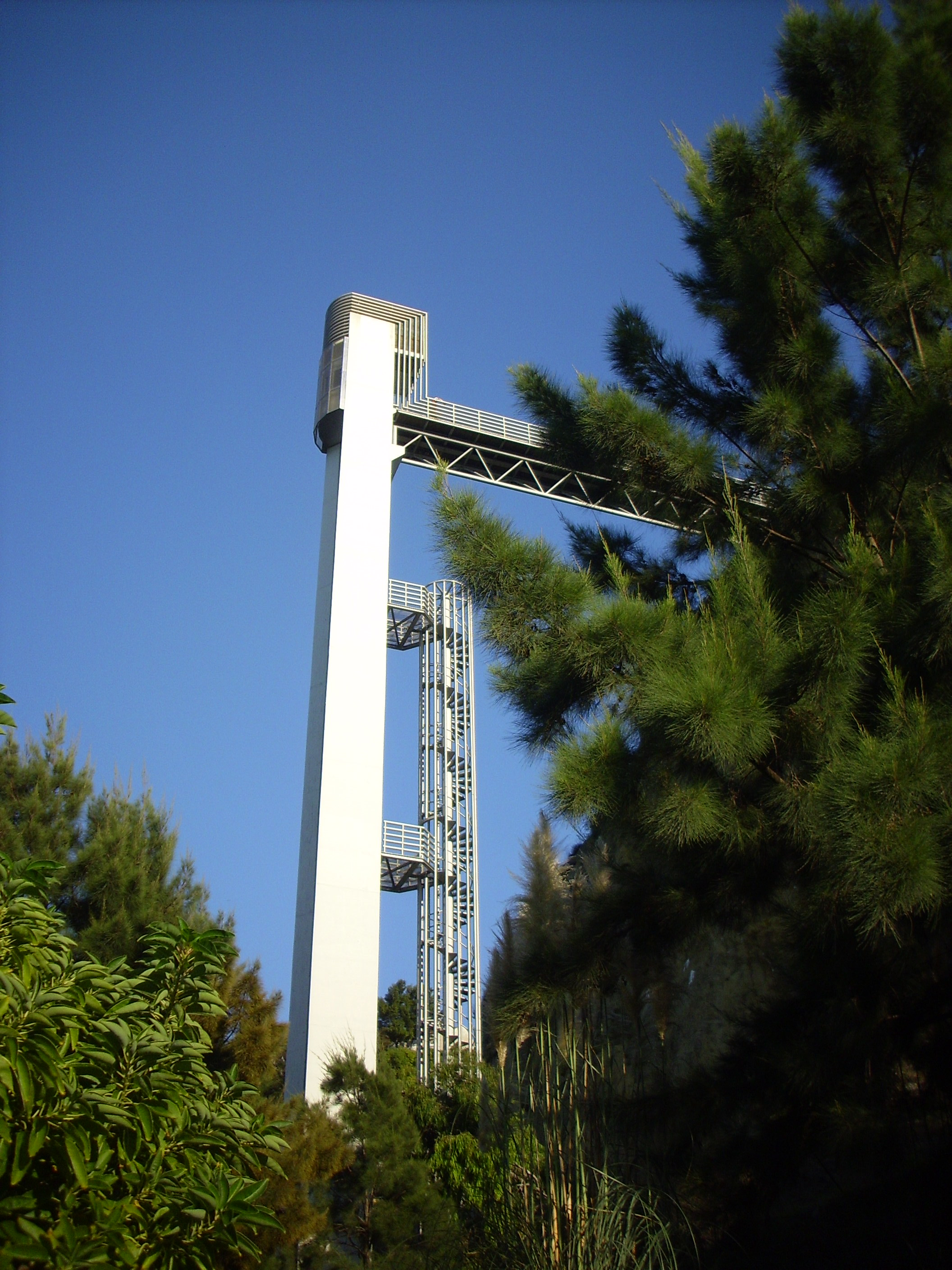
A view of the elevator from the base of the cliff

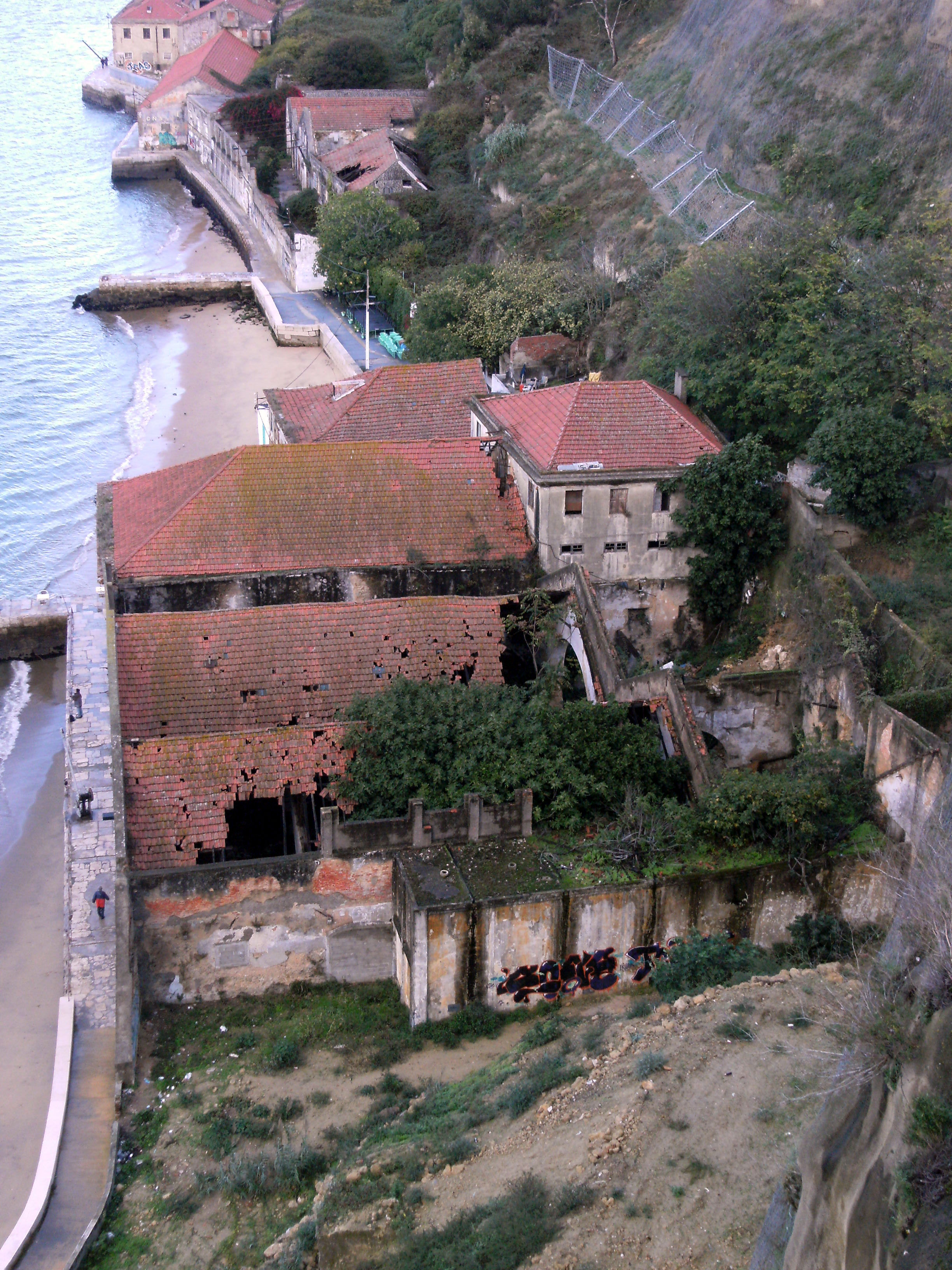
The base at the Tagus River, with the ruined warehouses and wharf
