= Almada, Cova da Piedade, Pragal e Cacilhas =

- Civil parish
- Location in Portugal
- Coordinates: 38.680°N 9.158°W
- Country: Portugal
- Region: Lisbon
- Metropolitan area: Lisbon
- District: Setúbal
- Municipality: Almada

Area
  - Total: 6.15 km^{2} (2.37 sq mi)

Population (2011)
  - Total: 49,661
  - Density: 8,100/km^{2} (21,000/sq mi)
- Time zone: UTC+00:00 (WET)
  - Summer (DST): UTC+01:00 (WEST)

Almada, Cova da Piedade, Pragal e Cacilhas is a civil parish in the municipality of Almada, in the Portuguese district of Setúbal. It was formed in 2013 from the merger of the former parishes of Almada, Cova da Piedade, Pragal and Cacilhas, and covers an area of 6.15 square kilometres (66,200,000 sq ft). In 2011 there were 49,661 inhabitants in the reconstituted parish.

== Architecture ==
=== Civic ===
- António José Gomes Primary School (Portuguese: Escola Primária António José Gomes)
- Boca do Vento Elevator (Portuguese: Elevador da Boca do Vento)
- Cacilhas Lighthouse (Portuguese: Farol de Cacilhas)
- Caramujo Milling Factory (Portuguese: Fábrica de Moagem do Caramujo)
- Emídio Navarro Secondary School (Portuguese: Escola Comercial e Industrial de Almada/Escola Técnica Emídio Navarro/Escola Secundária Emídio Navarro)
- Fountain of Pombal (Portuguese: Chafariz do Pombal)
- Fountain of Largo do Catita (Portuguese: Chafariz do Largo do Catita/Chafariz no Largo José Alaiz)
- Manorhouse of the Estate of Santa Rita (Portuguese: Casa da Quinta de Santa Rita)
- Manorhouse of the Estate of São Miguel (Portuguese: Casa da Quinta de São Miguel)
- Modern/Medieval Museum of Almada (Portuguese: Edifício do Núcleo Museológico Medieval / Moderno de Almada)
- Municipal Council Hall of Almada (Portuguese: Câmara Municipal de Almada)
- National Tuberculosos Dispensary (IANT) of Almada (Portuguese: Dispensário da Assistência Nacional aos Tuberculosos, IANT, de Almada)
- Palace of Cerca (Portuguese: Casa da Cerca/Palácio da Cerca)
- Residence of António José Gomes (Portuguese: Casa de António José Gomes)
- Residence/Chapel of the Estate of São Lourenço (Portuguese: Casa e Capela da Quinta de São Lourenço)
- Residence Rua da Ermida (Portuguese: Casa na Rua da Ermida)
- Residence Travessa da Judiaria (Portuguese: Casa na Travessa da Judiaria)
- Roman Salt Factory of Cacilhas (Portuguese: Fábrica Romana de Salga de Cacilhas)
- Santa Casa da Misericórdia of Almada (Portuguese: Edifício e lgreja da Santa Casa da Misericórdia de Almada
- Theatre Academia Almadense (Portuguese: Cine-Teatro da Academia Almadense)
- Theatre Incrível Aladense (Portuguese: Cine Incrível Almadense)

=== Religious ===
- Church of Christ the King (Portuguese: Capela de Nossa Senhora Mãe de Deus e dos Homens/Igreja Paroquial do Pragal/Igreja de Cristo Rei)
- Church of São Sebastião (Portuguese: Capela de São Sebastião/Igreja de São Sebastião)
- Convent of São Paulo (Portuguese: Convento de São Paulo/Seminário Patriarcal de São Paulo)
- Hermitage of Espírito Santo (Portuguese: Ermida do Espírito Santo)
