= Cacilhas Lighthouse =

Lighthouse near Lisbon, Portugal

Cacilhas Lighthouse Farol de Cacilhas
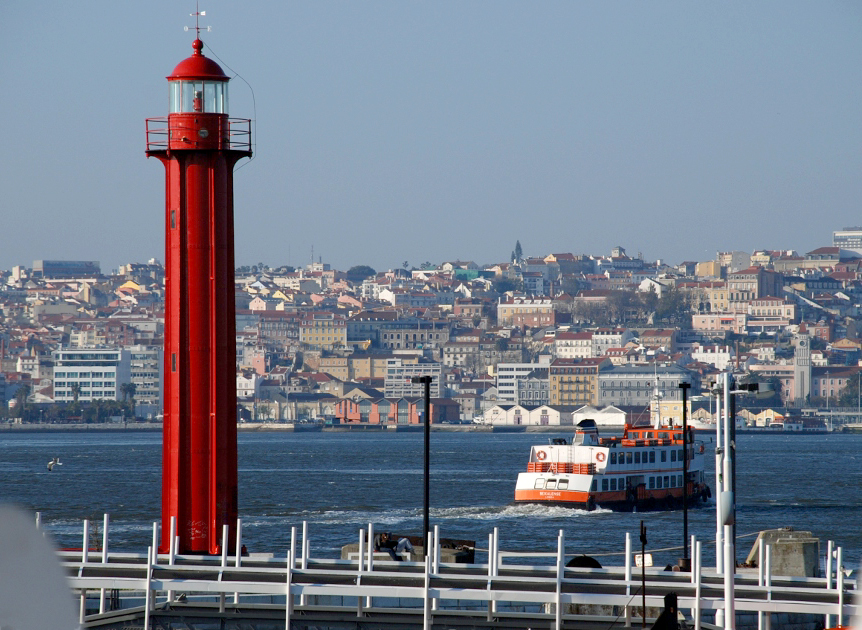
- Location: Cacilhas, Almada, Setúbal District, Portugal
- Coordinates: 38°41′17″N 9°08′47″W

Tower
- Constructed: 15 January 1886
- Construction: cast iron
- Height: 12 metres (39 ft)
- Shape: circular
- Markings: red, green
- Operator: Almada Naval Museum
- Heritage: heritage without legal protection

Light
- First lit: 1885
- Deactivated: 1978
- Lens: fifth order Fresnel lens
- Range: 11.5 nmi (21.3 km; 13.2 mi)

The Cacilhas Lighthouse (Portuguese: Farol de Cacilhas) is situated in the parish of Cacilhas, in the municipality of Almada, on the opposite side of the Tagus River from the Portuguese capital of Lisbon. Although not functioning, it was restored in 2009 as it is considered to be an important part of the area's heritage.

The lighthouse started operating on 31 December 1885 for the purpose of indicating the southern limit of the anchorage area on the River Tagus, an area where fog is common. It consisted of a cylindrical tower, 12 metres high and with a diameter of 1.7 meters. It emitted an oil-fuelled, fixed white light over 342 degrees, with a fifth-order lens giving a nominal range of 11.5 nautical miles. In May 1886 a bell, controlled by clockwork, was added. In 1905 a device was installed to cover the light for five seconds every minute to distinguish it from the fixed lights of vessels on the river.

As with other lighthouses in Portugal, the Cacilhas Lighthouse was shut down from March 1916 to the end of 1918, during the First World War. In 1927 it started to use acetylene gas for lighting, a fourth-order lens was installed and blue panels were added to give it a green light, to comply with international regulations for port lights. A pneumatic horn was installed in 1931 to replace the bell, which was donated to fishermen in Ericeira for use during fog. The lighthouse was connected to the public grid in 1957. A 500-watt bulb was installed, emitting a green flash for 0.3 seconds followed by a one-second concealment, with a range of 17 nautical miles. It became a popular attraction in the Cacilhas area.

The horn was deactivated in 1977. In 1978 it was decided to close the lighthouse, both because it no longer served a useful purpose for navigation and because it was in the way of construction work for the new terminal for passenger ferries connecting Cacilhas with Lisbon. It was dismantled and, in 1980, was sent to the Azores to replace the Serreta lighthouse on Terceira Island, which had been damaged by an earthquake on 1 January 1980.

At the request of the Municipality of Almada, the Directorate of Lighthouses agreed to the return of the structure to Cacilhas in 2000. It was disassembled in the first quarter of 2004, being replaced at Serreta with a glass fibre tower. Restoration was carried out by the Directorate at its headquarters at Paço de Arcos near Lisbon. A relocation ceremony for the restored lighthouse, which is now only for decorative purposes, was held on 18 July 2009. It stands a few meters from its original site. The lighthouse is now considered to be part of the Naval Museum of Almada. The restored tower was painted red, which was its original colour although from 1935 to 1978 it had been green. This changed of colour caused some mild controversy.

== See also ==
- List of lighthouses in Portugal
