= Serreta (Angra do Heroísmo) =

- Civil parish
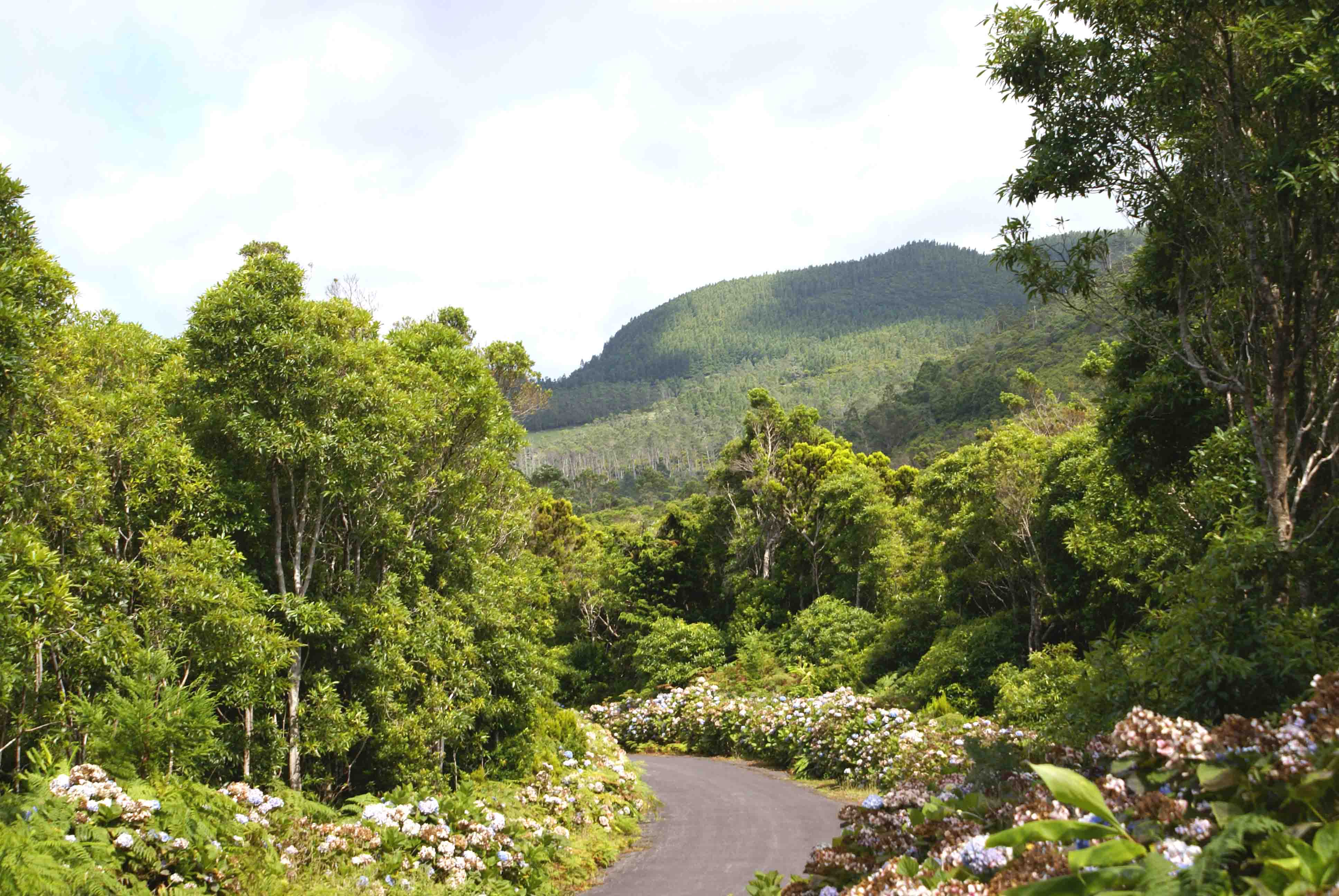
- A roadway in the foothills of Santa Bárbara in the parish of Serreta

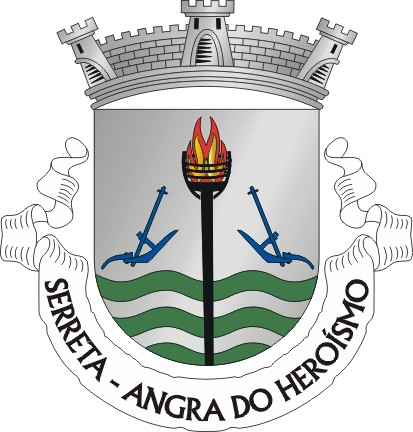
- Coat of arms

- Location in the Azores Serreta (Terceira)
- Coordinates: 38°44′46″N 27°21′56″W
- Country: Portugal
- Auton. region: Azores
- Island: Terceira
- Municipality: Angra do Heroísmo
- Established: Settlement: fl. 1684; Parish: c. 1861

Area
  - Total: 14.36 km^{2} (5.54 sq mi)
- Elevation: 298 m (978 ft)

Population (2011)
  - Total: 335
  - Density: 23.3/km^{2} (60.4/sq mi)
- Time zone: UTC−01:00 (AZOT)
  - Summer (DST): UTC+00:00 (AZOST)
- Postal code: 9700-661
- Area code: (+351) 292 XX XX XX
- Patron: Nossa Senhora dos Milagres
- Website: http://www.jfserreta.pt/

Serreta is a civil parish in the municipality of Angra do Heroísmo on the island of Terceira in the Portuguese archipelago of the Azores. Its elevation is approximately 471 metres (1,545 ft). The population in 2011 was 335, in an area of 14.36 km^{2}. It is the smallest parish in the municipality by population. It contains the localities Canada das Fontes, Canada do Mato, Rossa do Couto and Serreta.

== History ==
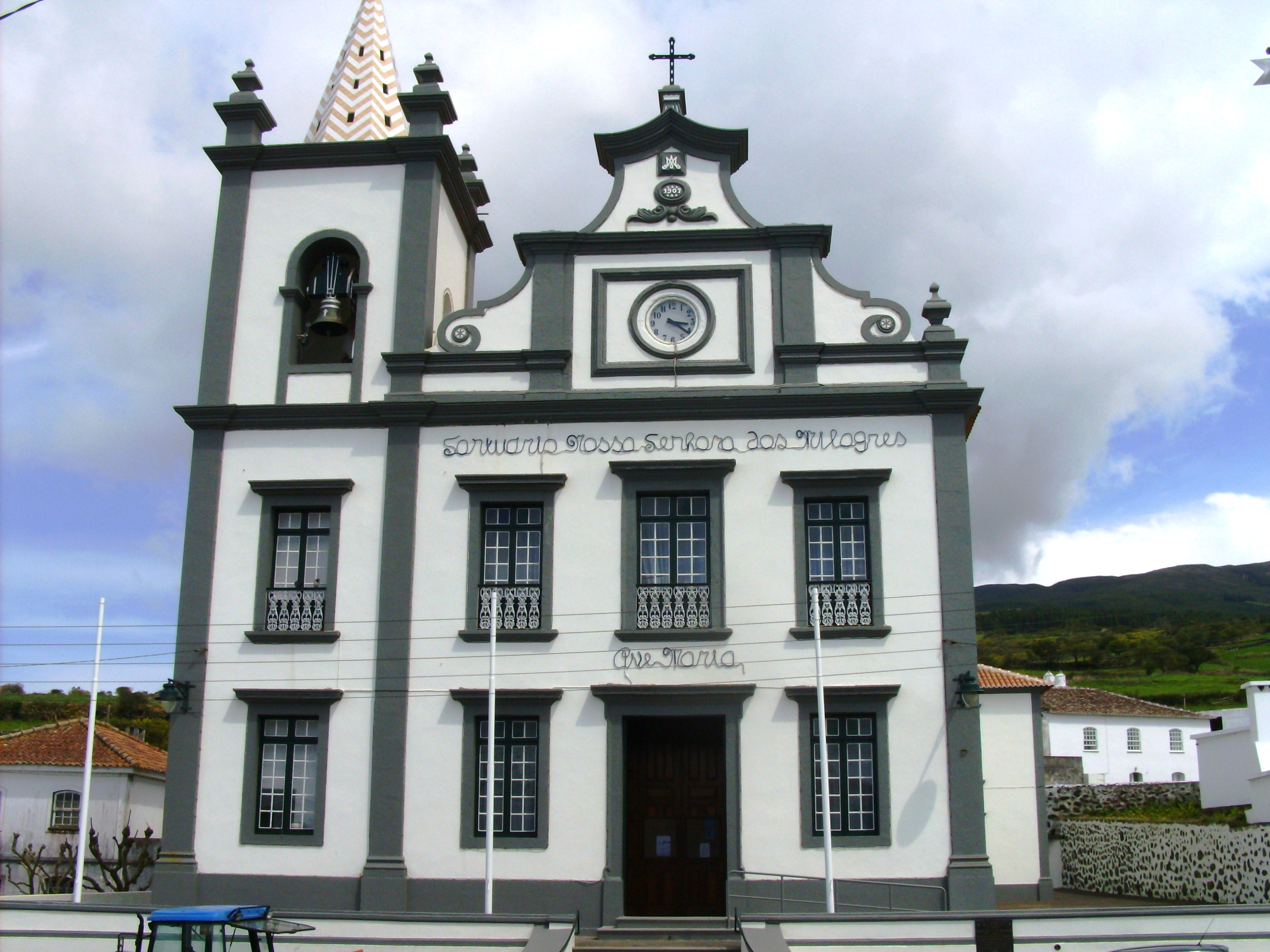
The parochial Church of Nossa Senhora dos Milagres completed in 1859

The settlement of the western portion of the island, that includes the parish of Serreta, began at the end of the 15th century, when uncultivated lands along the flanks of the Santa Bárbara massif were distributed by João Vaz Corte-Real, then Captain-donatário in Angra. The vast area, which extended from the current parishes of São Bartolomeu dos Regatos until Serreta followed the ravines, giving rise to the toponymic names Cinco Ribeiras, Nove Ribeiras or Doze Ribeiras. The administrative and religious centre of this region then concentrated on the Church of Santa Bárbara, which was established in 1489, and encompassed the communities from Cruz das Duas Ribeiras until Biscoito da Serreta.

The territory of Serreta, being far distant then the other settlements, was the last to be occupied. It was a border region of the parish of São Roque dos Alteres, and populated initially in the area of Ribeira das Catorze by peoples living in the settlement nucleus of Santa Bárbara. This was followed later in the area of Fajã, now uninhabited, which was settled by peoples from the parish of Altares, until the beginning of the 19th century. While the rest of the southwest coast developed around 1510 (except for a few zones, such as Fajã), the territory of Serreta was generally settled much later, during the middle of the 17th century. Generally, the area was still in a natural condition, where a hermit priest began to reside. The poor soils, over pumice (the Portuguese: bagacina branca of Serreta), the altitude and exposure to southwestern winds, made the lands inhospitable and most unproductive on the island. Western farmers from Angra realized the unoccupied spaces could be used to raise cattle, sheep and pigs, but the conditions were inadequate, and the animals raised there were considered worst and weakest on the island.

Yet, over time, some population concentrated in the territory west of the old parish of Santa Bárbara. As a result, the hermitage of São Jorge, situated in Doze Ribeiras, was at the beginning of the 17th century transformed into the parish of Santa Bárbara das Nove Ribeiras, under the direction of Father Francisco Dias Godinho. This parish included all the territory that extended west until Biscoito da Serreta, where the parish bordered Altares (and included Serreta), although Fajã continued to an area connected religiously to the parish of Altares and municipality of the Vila de São Sebastião. At the end 1684, the clergy of São Jorge das Doze Ribeiras began to operate as their own independent parish, with its first vicar, Father Manuel Tristão de Melo, as parish priest. The new parish was limited by the tenth ravine in the district (the Ribeira das Dez), which today remains a division to Santa Bárbara and the cliffs of Peneireiro (in Biscoito da Fajã), where the island extends northwest, separating the Raminho dos Folhadais (which continued to function under the parish of Altares). Consequently, Serreta began to function within this new institution.

== Architecture ==
=== Civic ===
- Lighthouse of Serreta (Portuguese: Farol da Serreta), located at the Ponta da Serreta, the lighthouse was completed in 1908, after originally being conceived in the late 19th century
- Serreta Inn (Portuguese: Estalagem da Serreta), designed by architect João Correia Rebelo, the inn was constructed between 1963 and 1969 (and opened on 9 September 1969) to support visitors to the western coast of Angra do Heroísmo, but by the end of the 1980s the inn was abandoned and closed. During its short history, it hosted French President Georges Pompidou, on the occasion of the 12–14 December 1971 Atlantic Meeting with U.S. President Richard M. Nixon. It was later used by the Associação La Patriache to assist addicts, with the support of the Regional Government, before being bought by Grupo Paim in 1998. It was classified as a property of public interest by the Regional Government of the Azores on 24 January 2007.

=== Religious ===
- Church of Nossa Senhora dos Milagres (Portuguese: Igreja de Nossa Senhora dos Milagres), completed in the 19th century (1852) from the donations of its parochia, but damaged after the 1980 earthquake.
