= Komodo =

Komodo may refer to:

== Places ==
- Komodo (island), Indonesia
  - Komodo (village), its main settlement
  - Komodo, West Manggarai, the wider district
  - Komodo National Park

== Arts and entertainment ==
=== Works ===
- Komodo (film), a 1999 Australian horror
- "Komodo (Save a Soul)", a 2000 song by Mauro Picotto

=== Fictional characters ===
- Komodo (comics), several characters in Marvel Comics
- A character in the Nocturnals comic-book series
- A character in The Secret Saturdays TV series

== Computing ==
- Komodo Edit, a text editor for programming
- Komodo IDE, an integrated development environment
- Komodo (chess), a chess engine

== Vehicles ==
- Pindad Komodo, a tactical 4×4
- Fin Komodo, a buggy

== Other uses ==
- KOMODO, Japanese video game publisher
- Komodo dragon, a large lizard
- Komodo people, the original inhabitants of Komodo
- Komodo language, spoken on Komodo
- Exercise Komodo, hosted by the Indonesian Navy
- The Komodos, nickname of Persamba West Manggarai, an association football club in Indonesia

== See also ==
- Comodo (disambiguation)
- Kamado, a traditional Japanese wood- or charcoal-fueled cook stove
- Kodomo (disambiguation)
