= Komodo people =

Ethnic group in Indonesia

Ata Modo
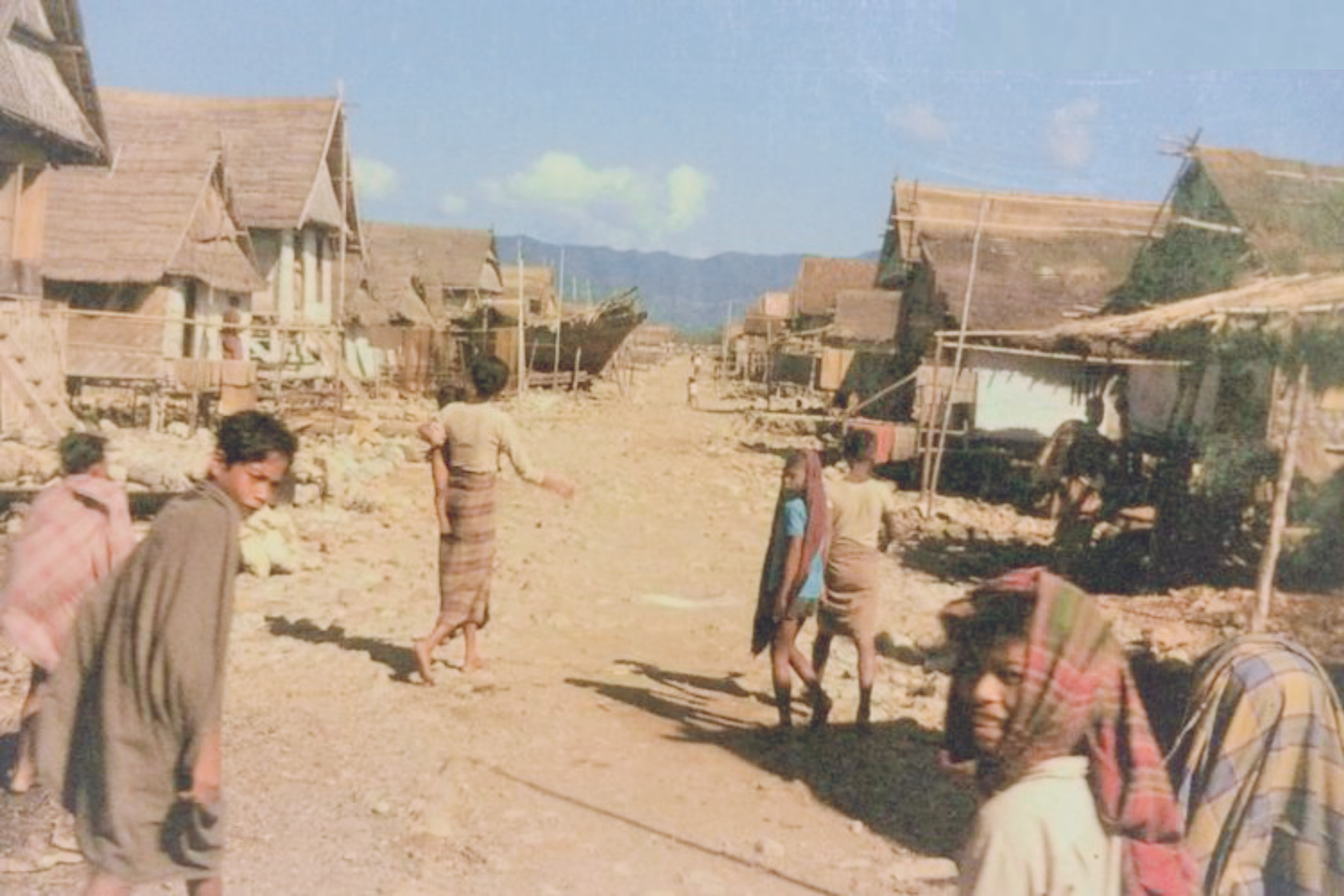
- Native inhabitants of Komodo island.

Total population
- Extinct

Regions with significant populations
- Indonesia (Komodo island)

Languages
- Komodo, Manggarai, and other Austronesian languages

Religion
- Islam (Sunni)

Related ethnic groups
- Manggarai, Bimanese, Sama-Bajau

The Komodo people (Komodo: Ata Modo; Indonesian: Orang Komodo) were an Austronesian ethnic group native to the island of Komodo, West Manggarai Regency, East Nusa Tenggara in Indonesia. They called themselves Ata Modo (lit. 'Modo people') and called the island they inhabited Tana Modo. Anthropologist J.A.J. Verheijen dubbed them "Komodo people" in 1989.

The island's present-day residents are descendants of former convicts who were exiled to Komodo, and who have mixed with Bugis people from the southern part of Sulawesi. The population is primarily adherents of Islam, but there are also Christian and Hindu congregations.

== History and culture ==
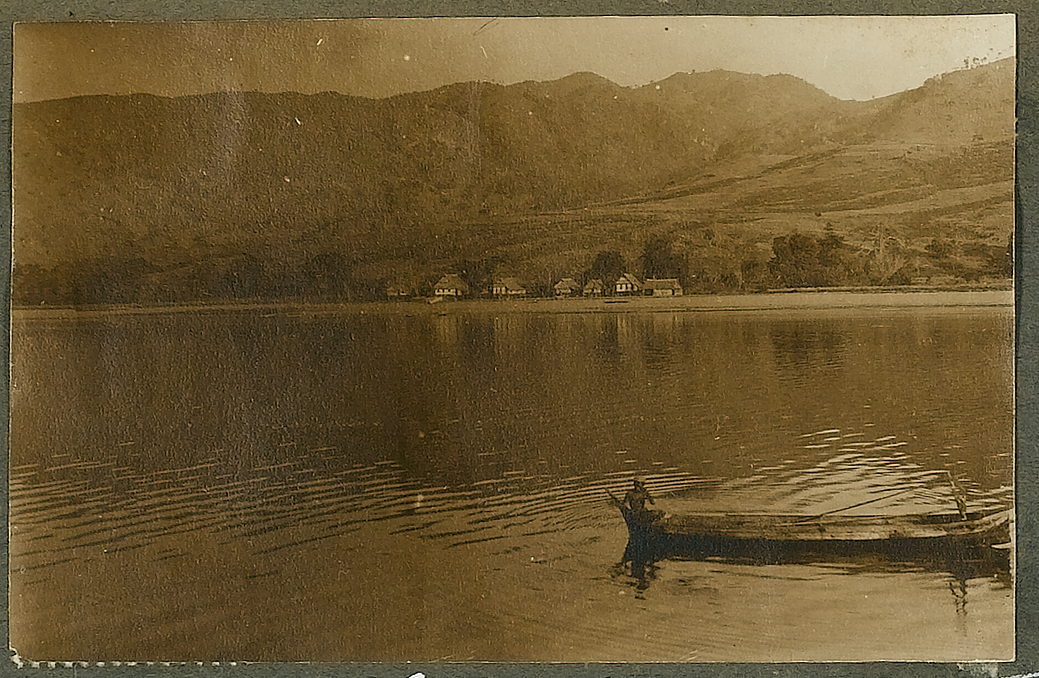
Settlements and the Komodo coast, the west of Flores in the Sape Strait, 1926.

The first people to inhabit Komodo island and Rinca island were the Komodo people, followed by the Sama-Bajau.

According to legend, the komodo dragon is actually a twin of the Komodo people—a woman named Putri Naga married a local man, subsequently giving birth to both a male human and an egg that later hatched into a female komodo dragon. The Komodo people's connection to the komodo dragon was discovered when Putri Naga's son was out hunting; when he attempted to kill a komodo dragon about to eat the deer he had hunted, his mother Putri Naga appeared and told him that the komodo dragon was his twin sister.

In the Komodo language, the komodo dragons are called sebae (lit. 'twins').

The traditional food of the Komodo people is mbuta, a dish made from gebang seed flour.

== Language ==
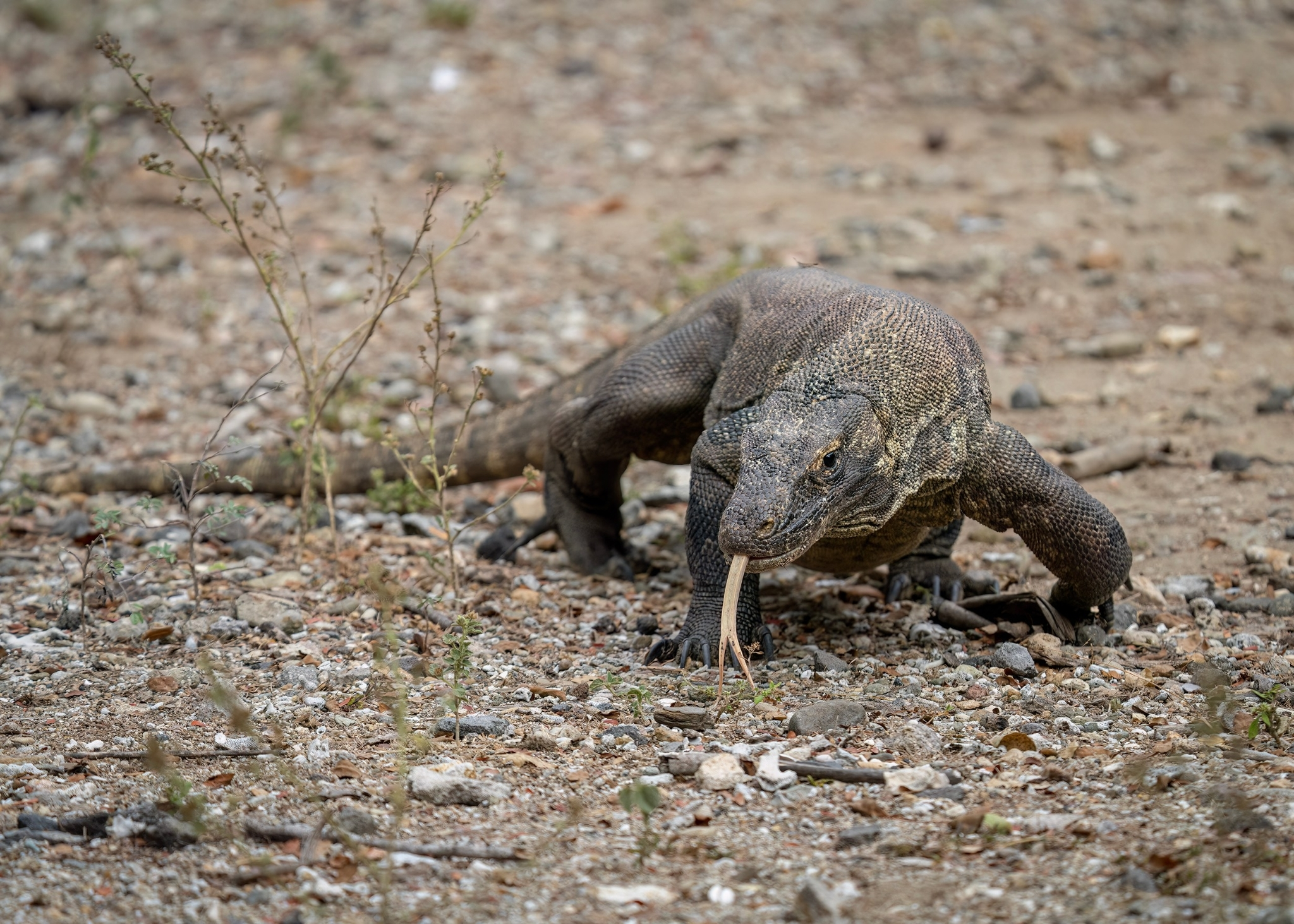
The Komodo dragon, a spiritually important animal for the Komodo people.

Komodo people use the Komodo, Manggarai, Bimanese, and Bugis languages in their daily lives, and also use Indonesian when meeting people outside their group or when acting as tour guides at Komodo National Park or when selling souvenirs.

The Komodo people are believed to be able to speak to Komodo dragons, due to the myth of sharing the same mother.

== Religion and beliefs ==
The Komodo people are predominantly Muslim, mixed with local supernatural beliefs, such as the myth of the Putri Naga.

== Traditional dances ==
Kolo kamba is a traditional dance that tells the story of the Komodo ancestors' struggles. A leader (ompu dato) will erect a log approximately 1 metre (3.3 ft) high, while drums are beaten, men dance, the silat martial art is performed, and the log is beaten similar to the kuda lumping dance of Java. The log is beaten because it is a symbol of evil.

Aru gile is a singing dance performed by women, who pound rice as an expression of gratitude for the harvest.

== Distribution ==
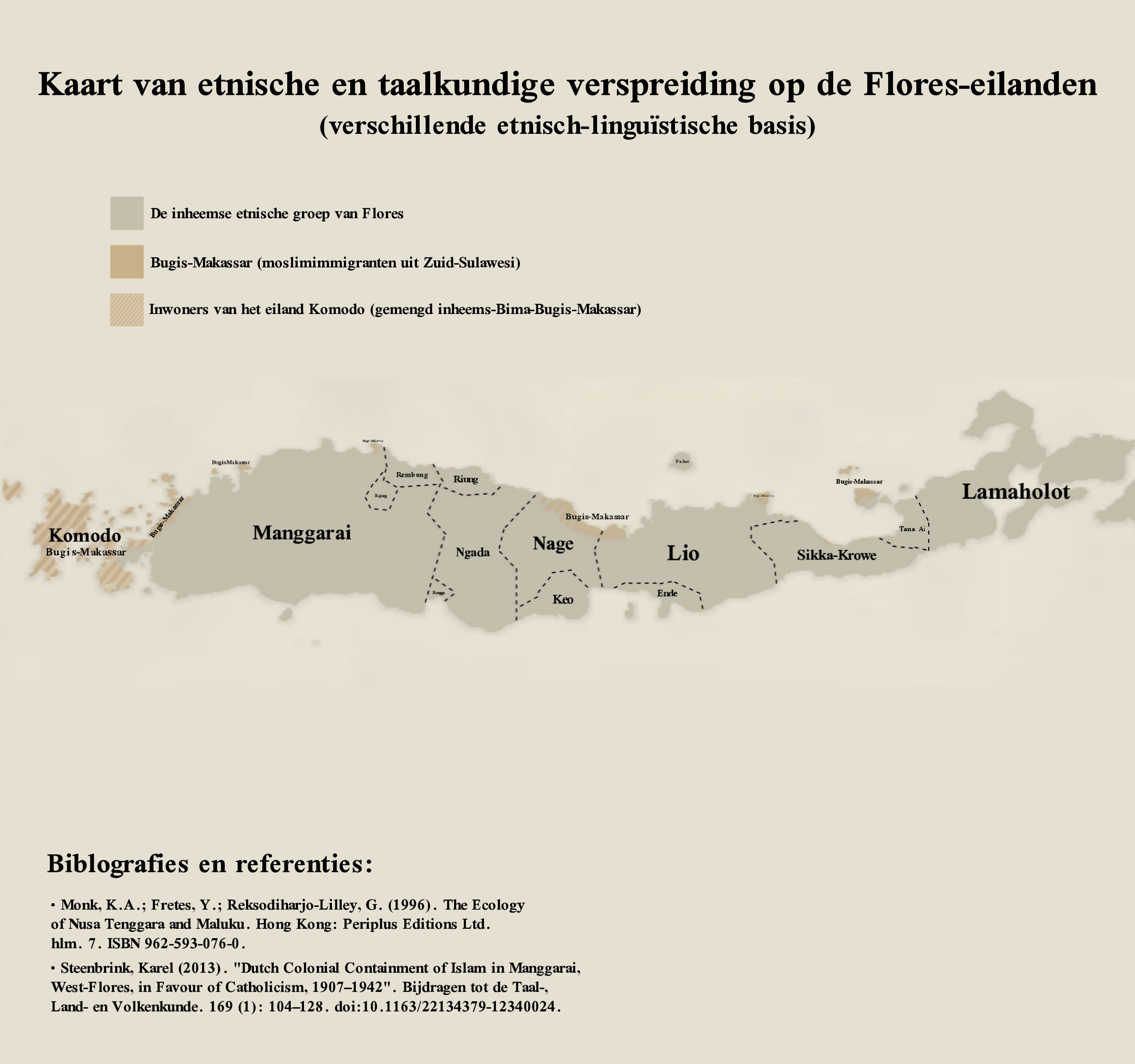
Distribution map of ethnic groups; the Komodo people are located on the far left, combined with the immigrant Bugis people on Flores and the surrounding small islands.

The principal Komodo settlement, Komodo village, is located on Komodo island in Komodo District, West Manggarai Regency, East Nusa Tenggara, Indonesia. The Komodo District includes not only the islands of Komodo and Rinca, but also other smaller islands off the west coast of Flores, with 128 islands altogether in the Komodo District. Much of the mainland part of West Manggarai Regency, including the town of Labuan Bajo, the capital of the regency and of the district, is also part of the Komodo District.

The Komodos were the first ethnic group to settle on Rinca, followed later by the Bimanese, Manggarai, Sama-Bajau, and Bugis.

== Population ==
The principal settlement of Komodo village is a fishing town home to around 800 families, with a population of about 2,000 people in 2019. The majority are fishermen, although some are active as rangers in Komodo National Park. In the 1930s, the Komodo population was said to be 143 people. By 1977, this had increased to 505 people.

== See also ==
- Komodo dragon
- Komodo National Park
- Komodo language
- Komodo island
- Komodo village
- Komodo District
