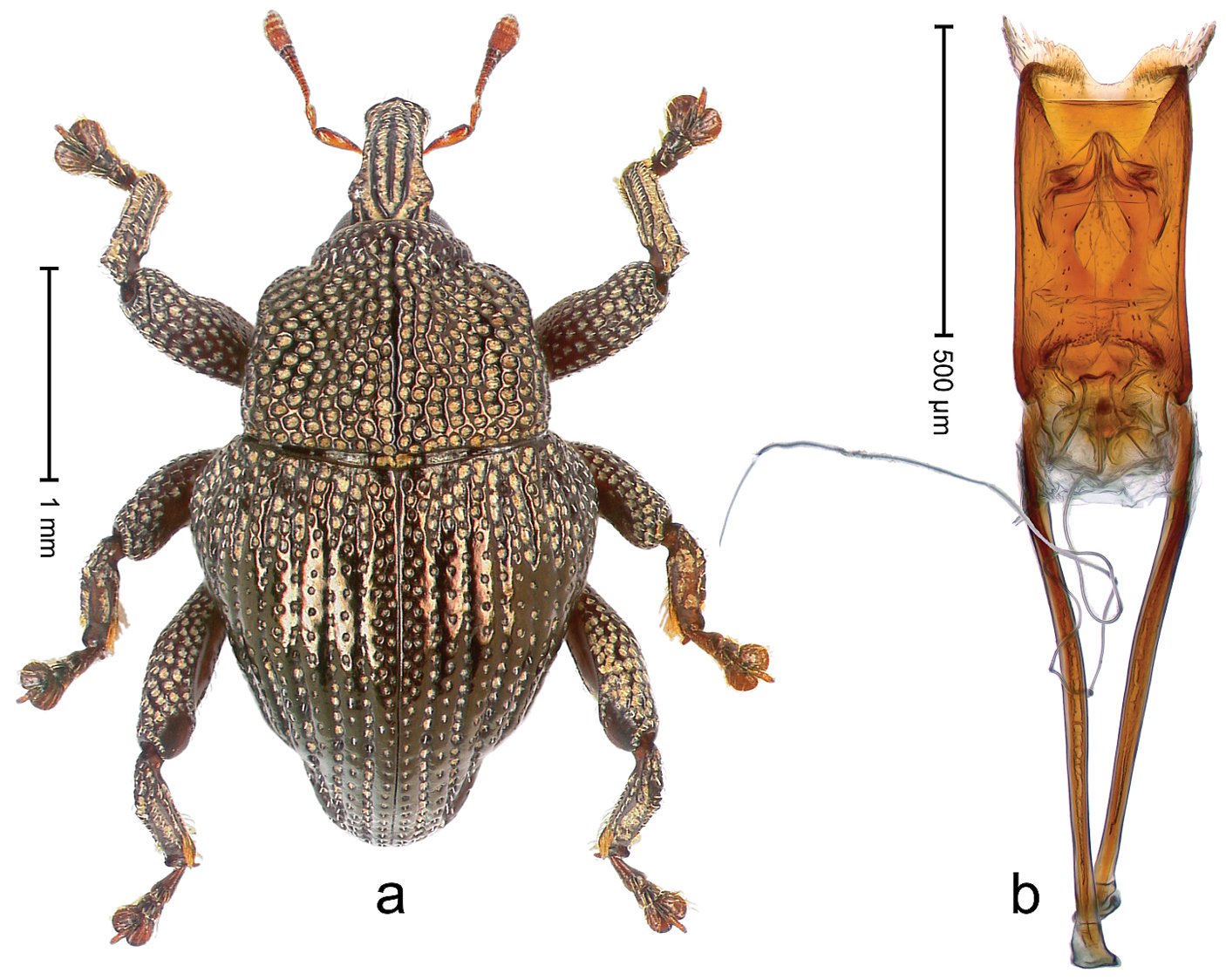

Scientific classification
- Kingdom: Animalia
- Phylum: Arthropoda
- Class: Insecta
- Order: Coleoptera
- Suborder: Polyphaga
- Infraorder: Cucujiformia
- Family: Curculionidae
- Genus: Trigonopterus
- Species: T. cuprescens

Binomial name
- Trigonopterus cuprescens Riedel, 2014

= Trigonopterus cuprescens =

Species of beetle

Trigonopterus cuprescens is a species of flightless weevil in the genus Trigonopterus from Indonesia. The species was described in 2014. The beetle is 2.72–3.05 mm long. The body is black with ferruginous legs and antennae, with the pronotum and elytra showing a strong bronze-coppery sheen. Endemic to West Nusa Tenggara, where it is known from Labuan Bajo on the island of Flores at elevations of 525–955 m (1,720–3,130 ft).

== Taxonomy ==
Trigonopterus cuprescens was described by the entomologist Alexander Riedel in 2014 on the basis of an adult male specimen collected from Labuan Bajo on the island of Flores in Indonesia. The specific name is derived from the Latin word cuprescens, meaning 'coppery'.

== Description ==
The beetle is 2.72–3.05 mm long. The body is black with ferruginous legs and antennae, with the pronotum and elytra showing a strong bronze-coppery sheen. The body is elongate and shows a pronounced constriction between the pronotum and elytra in dorsal view, and is convex in profile. The rostrum features a median ridge and a pair of submedian ridges that converge and unite on the forehead. The furrows between these ridges contain sparse rows of suberect, elongate scales, and the apical third is coarsely punctate. The epistome bears a transverse, angular ridge.

The pronotum has subparallel sides that slightly converge anteriorly, with a distinct subapical constriction. Its disc is coarsely punctate and reticulate, with each puncture containing a brown recumbent seta. A pair of submedian impressions is present, and the central area is swollen with an indistinct median ridge. The elytra have swollen, laterally projecting humeri. The striae are distinct and deeply impressed, while the intervals are costate and punctate, with coarse and dense punctures near the base. A transverse polished band is present near the middle.

The profemur is simple, while the meso- and metafemora have an anteroventral ridge forming a large, acute tooth. The metafemur also bears a subapical stridulatory patch. The dorsal edge of the tibiae shows a subbasal angulation. Abdominal ventrite 5 is flat, densely punctate, and covered with erect setae.

The penis has subparallel sides and a rounded apex, which bears a fringe of conglutinate, flattened setae interrupted by a glabrous median notch. The transfer apparatus is compact, and the apodemes are twice the length of the penis body. The ductus ejaculatorius lacks a bulbus.

The bronze pronotum and elytra may show a slightly greenish or reddish lustre. Females have a more slender body. The female rostrum is punctate-rugose dorsally, with a median and a pair of submedian nearly glabrous ridges; the epistome is simple. The female elytra have less prominent humeri, a subapical constriction, and an extended apex with a notched suture. Abdominal ventrite 5 in females bears sparse, subrecumbent setae.

== Distribution ==
Trigonopterus cuprescens is endemic to the Indonesian province of West Nusa Tenggara, where it is known from Labuan Bajo on the island of Flores. It has been recorded at elevations of 525–955 m (1,720–3,130 ft).
