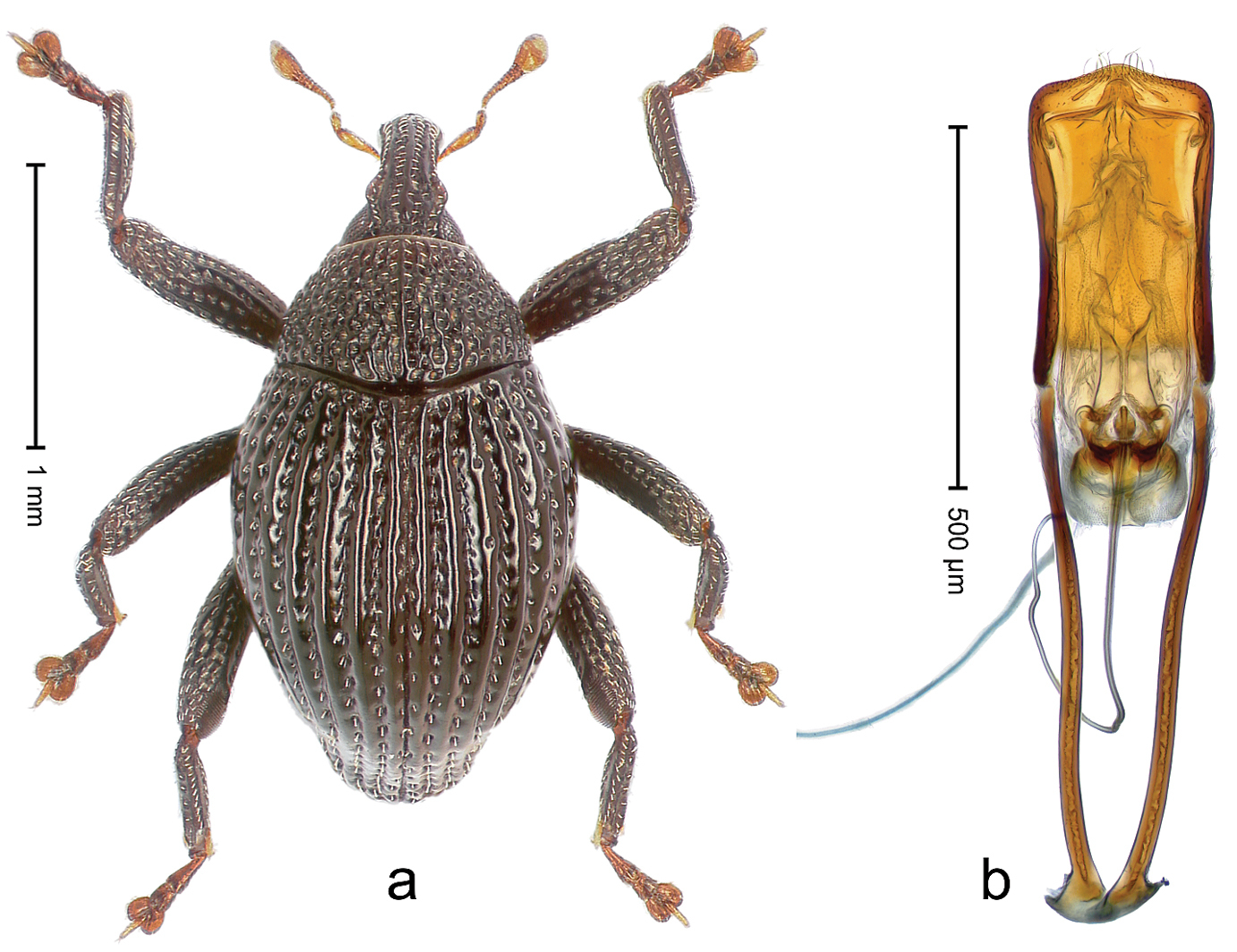

Scientific classification
- Kingdom: Animalia
- Phylum: Arthropoda
- Class: Insecta
- Order: Coleoptera
- Suborder: Polyphaga
- Infraorder: Cucujiformia
- Family: Curculionidae
- Genus: Trigonopterus
- Species: T. enam

Binomial name
- Trigonopterus enam Riedel, 2014

= Trigonopterus enam =

Species of beetle

Trigonopterus enam is a species of flightless weevil in the genus Trigonopterus from Indonesia.

== Etymology ==
The specific name is derived from the Indonesian word for "six".

== Description ==
Individuals measure 2.06–2.24 mm in length. Body is slightly oval in shape. General coloration is black, with rust-colored antennae, tarsi, and tibiae.

== Range ==
The species is found around elevations of 790–965 metres (2,592–3,166 ft) in Labuan Bajo on the island of Flores, part of the Indonesian province of East Nusa Tenggara.

== Phylogeny ==
T. enam is part of the T. saltator species group.
