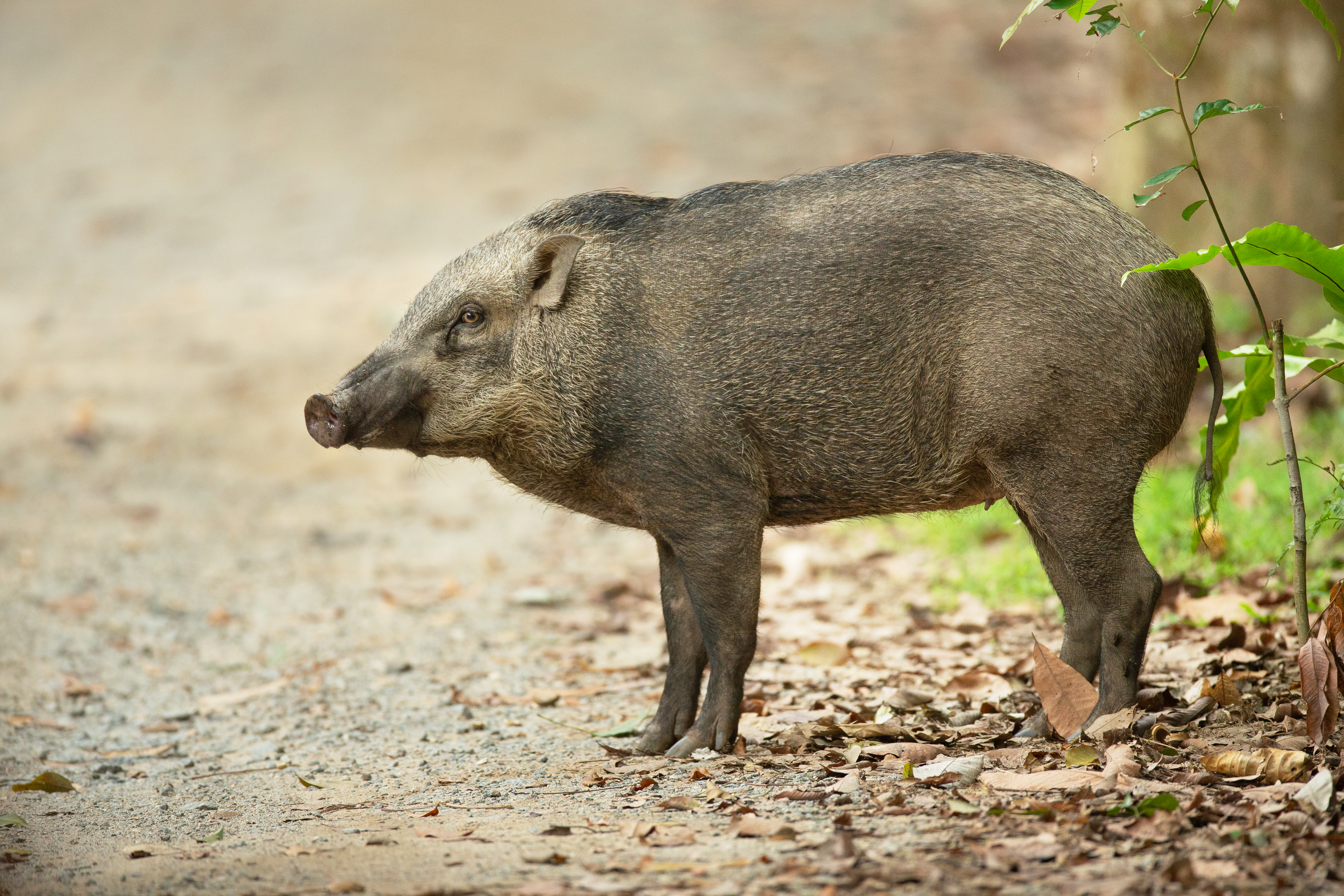
- A banded pig on Pulau Ubin, Singapore

Scientific classification
- Kingdom: Animalia
- Phylum: Chordata
- Class: Mammalia
- Order: Artiodactyla
- Family: Suidae
- Genus: Sus
- Species: S. scrofa
- Subspecies: S. s. vittatus

Trinomial name
- Sus scrofa vittatus Boie, 1828

Synonyms
- Sus scrofa andersoni; Sus scrofa jubatulus; Sus scrofa milleri; Sus scrofa pallidiloris; Sus scrofa peninsularis; Sus scrofa rhionis; Sus scrofa typicus

= Banded pig =

Subspecies of wild boar

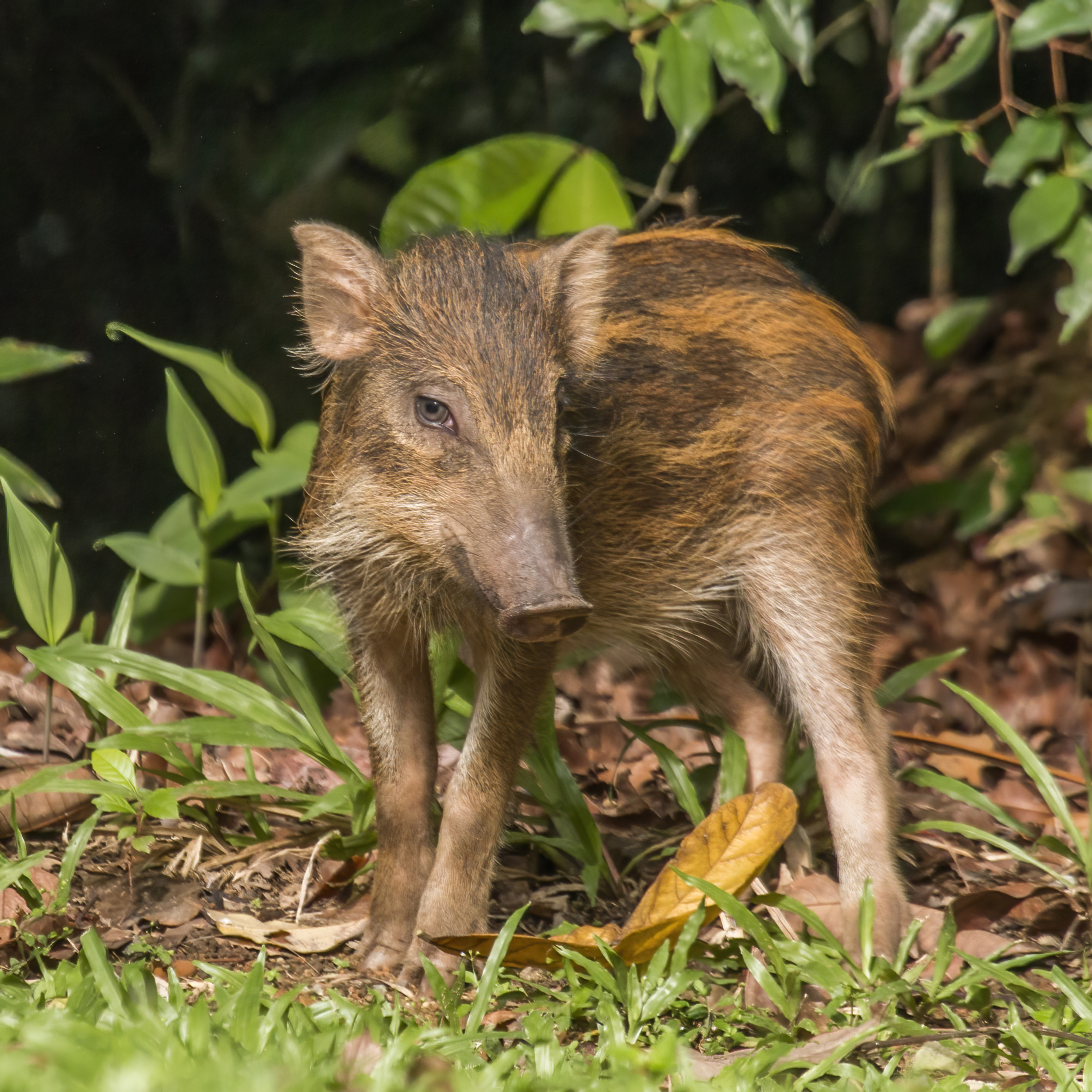
Juvenile in Pulau Ubin island, Singapore

The banded pig (Sus scrofa vittatus), also known as the Indonesian wild boar, is a subspecies of wild boar native to the Thai-Malay Peninsula and many Indonesian islands, including Sumatra, Java, and has been introduced to the Lesser Sundas in ancient times. It is known as the wild boar in Singapore. It is the sister lineage to the other subspecies, and has the smallest relative brain size, more primitive dentition, and unspecialised cranial structure. It is a short-faced subspecies with a white band on the muzzle, as well as sparse body hair, no underwool, a fairly long mane, and a broad reddish band extending from the muzzle to the sides of the neck. It is much smaller than the mainland S. s. cristatus subspecies, with the largest specimens on Komodo weighing only 48 kg.

In some areas, it differs from most other boar populations by being highly frugivorous, with specimens in Ujung Kulon National Park in Java eating around 50 different fruit species, especially figs, thus making them important seed dispersers. On the islands of Komodo and Rinca, its diet is more varied, encompassing roots, tubers, grasses, insects, fruits, snakes, and carrion. It also frequently eats crabs during low tide. Piglets are born from December to March in litters of two to six, and are raised in grass nests constructed by their mother. They are much less vividly striped than the young of S. s. scrofa.

On the islands of Komodo, Rinca, and Flores, the banded pig is a primary food source for Komodo dragons.
