= Mirror Stone Cave =

Mirror stone cave (or Goa Batu Cermin in Indonesian) is a cave or tunnel located in a rock hill in West Manggarai, Flores, East Nusa Tenggara, Indonesia, just a few kilometers to the east of the town of Labuan Bajo.

The cave earns its name from the walls that sparkle when catching the morning sun through a crevice in the roof. The sparkling occurs because the cave walls contain salt, believed to be present from the time that the cave was presumed to be underwater thousands of years ago. Corals and fossils of marine animals have been found in the cave walls supporting the presumption that the district was once underwater.
