= Cyrtodactylus laevigatus =

Scientific classification
- Domain: Eukaryota
- Kingdom: Animalia
- Phylum: Chordata
- Class: Reptilia
- Order: Squamata
- Infraorder: Gekkota
- Family: Gekkonidae
- Genus: Cyrtodactylus
- Species: C. laevigatus

Binomial name
- Cyrtodactylus laevigatus Darevsky, 1964

Synonyms
- Gonydactylus laevigatus

Species of lizard

Cyrtodactylus laevigatus is a species of gecko that is endemic to Komodo in Indonesia.
