= Kodomo =

Kodomo is the Japanese word for child.

Kodomo may also refer to:

- Kodomo (musician), the stage name of American electronic musician Chris Child
- Children's anime and manga or kodomo, manga with a target demographic of children
- Kodomo, a toothpaste brand from Lion Corporation
- "Kodomo", a song by Gen Hoshino from Baka no Uta (2010)

== See also ==
- Komodo (disambiguation)
