= Comodo =

Comodo may refer to:

- Comodo, a a term in sheet music
- Comodo Group, the former name of a software company
  - Comodo Internet Security, their software suite
  - Comodo Certification Authority

== See also ==
- Komodo (disambiguation)
- Commodus, a Roman emperor
