= Komodo (village) =

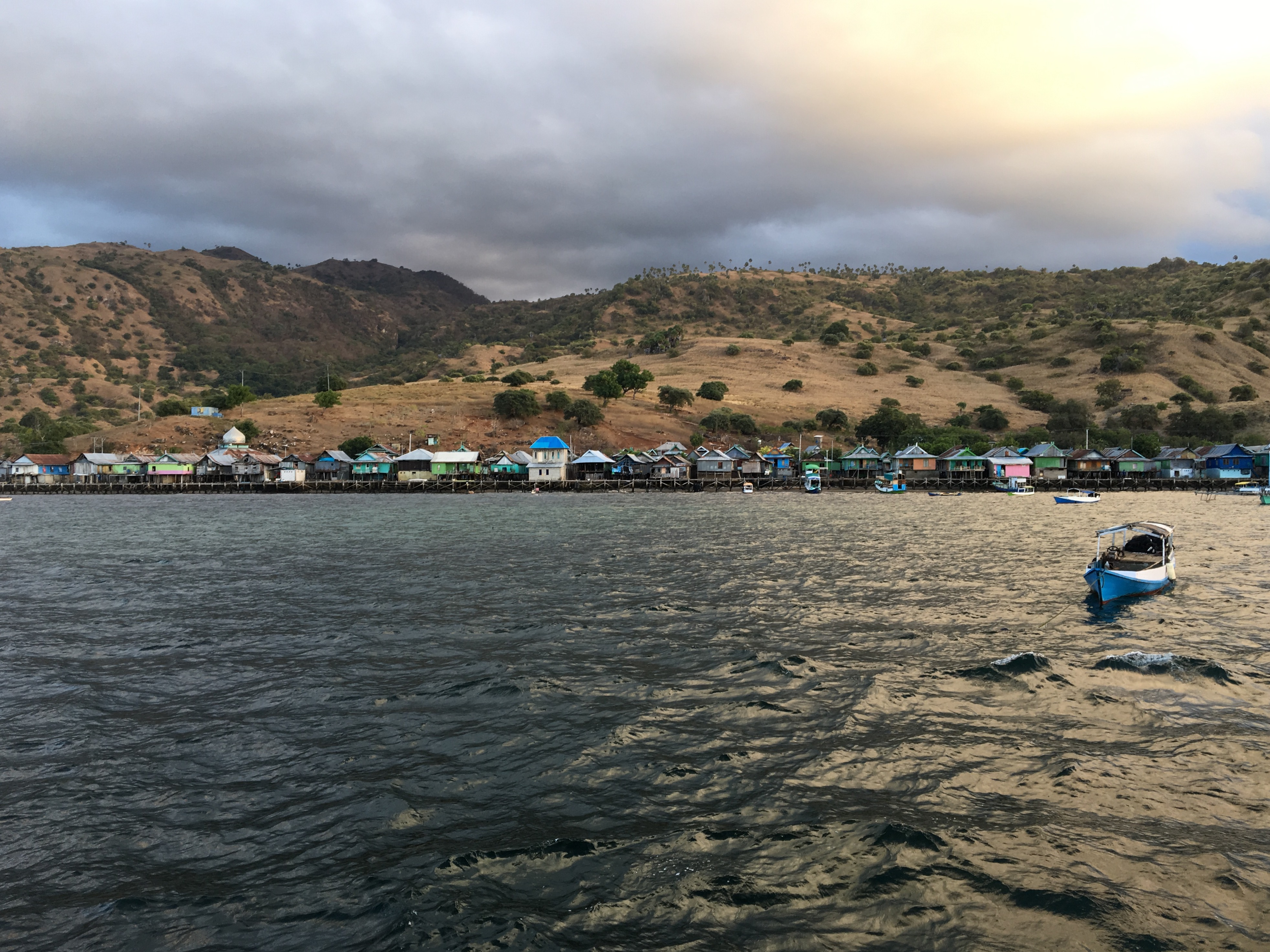
- A view of Komodo village from its harbor
- Interactive map of Komodo
- Coordinates: 8°35′28″S 119°29′17″E
- Country: Indonesia
- Region: Lesser Sunda Islands
- Province: East Nusa Tenggara
- Regency: West Manggarai

Area
  - Total: 198.08 km^{2} (76.48 sq mi)

Population (2017)
  - Total: 1,764
- Time zone: UTC+8 (WITA)

Komodo is a village on the island of Komodo in Komodo District, West Manggarai Regency, East Nusa Tenggara Province, Indonesia.

The village encompasses the territory of Komodo island, as well as small surrounding islands.

== Population ==
The native population of Komodo, the Komodo people, has been extinct since the 1980s. The present population consists of Bugis people from South Sulawesi and Bima people from West Nusa Tenggara.
