= Komodo, West Manggarai =

Komodo kecamatan Komodo
- District
- Interactive map of Komodo
- Country: Indonesia
- Region: Lesser Sunda Islands
- Province: East Nusa Tenggara
- Regency: West Manggarai

Area
  - Total: 986.84 km^{2} (381.02 sq mi)

Population (mid 2024 estimate)
  - Total: 62,224
  - Density: 63.054/km^{2} (163.31/sq mi)
- Time zone: UTC+8

Komodo is an administrative district (Indonesian: kecamatan) in the regency (Indonesian: kabupaten) of West Manggarai, East Nusa Tenggara, Indonesia. The district includes not only the islands of Komodo and Rinca (with other smaller islands) off the west coast of Flores (altogether there are 128 islands in Komodo District), but also much of the mainland part of West Manggarai Regency including the town of Labuan Bajo (which is the capital of the regency and of the district). In mid 2024 it had a population of 62,224, comprising 31,446 males and 30,778 females.

== Towns and Villages ==
The areas and populations (as at mid 2024) of the component two urban kelurahan (Wae Kelambu and Labuan Bajo) and seventeen rural desa of Komodo District are tabulated below.

Kode Wilayah	Name of kelurahan or desa	Area in km^{2}	Pop'n Estimate mid 2024
53.15.05.2001	Komodo (island)	352.17	1,999
53.15.05.2018	Papa Garang ^{(a)}	2.18	1,683
53.15.05.2003	Pasir Panjang (Rinca Island)	216.76	1,792
53.15.05.2004	Golo Mori ^{(b)}	145.49	2,290
53.15.05.2005	Warloka	40.32	2,038
53.15.05.2022	Tiwu Nampar	40.13	1,205
53.15.05.2015	Golo Pongkor	11.87	1,108
53.15.05.2008	Macang Tanggar	51.29	3,666
53.15.05.2002	Pasir Putih ^{(c)}	6.89	2,240
53.15.05.2020	Goron Talo	7.47	7,866
53.15.05.2007	Golo Bilas	18.29	6,249
53.15.05.2016	Nggorang	21.99	2,516
53.15.05.2009	Watu Nggelek	4.25	1,036
53.15.05.1024	Wae Kelambu (town)	22.92	8,793
53.15.05.2019	Batu Cermin	8.04	7,502
53.15.05.1025	Labuan Bajo (town)	13.19	7,226
53.15.05.2028	Pantar	8.02	915
53.15.05.2026	Seraya Maranu	6.92	651
53.15.05.2027	Compang Longgo	8.68	1,449
53.15.05	Totals	986.84	62,224

Note: (a) mainly Papagarang Island (Pulau Papagarang) to the north of Rinca Island.
(b) the southern portion of the 'mainland' part of the administrative district, including Motang Island off the southwest coast of Flores.
(c) mainly Great Serayu Island (Pulau Serayu Besar), an island to the north of Labuan Bajo.

== National Park ==
The Komodo National Park (Indonesian: Taman Nasional Komodo) is a national park in Indonesia located within West Manggarai Regency. The park includes the three larger islands of Komodo, Padar and Rinca, and 26 smaller ones, with a total area of 1,817 km^{2}. The national park was founded in 1980 to protect the Komodo dragon, the world's largest lizard. In 1991 the national park was declared a UNESCO World Heritage Site and a Man and Biosphere Reserve. It is considered one of the world's 25 biodiversity hotspots, and is also a part of the Coral Triangle, which contains some of the richest marine biodiversity on Earth.

It is also a WWF Global 200 Marine Eco-region, a WWF/IUCN Centre of Plant Diversity, one of the world's Endemic Bird Areas and an ASEAN Heritage Park.
