= Komodo language =

Austronesian language from Komodo Island

Komodo
- Wana Modo
- Native to: Indonesia
- Region: Komodo Island and mainland Flores
- Ethnicity: Komodo (extinct); Bugis and Bimanese (only on Komodo Island)
- Native speakers: (700 cited 2000)
- Language family: Austronesian: Malayo-Polynesian; Central–Eastern MP; Bima–Sumba; Komodo
- Writing system: Latin

Language codes
- ISO 639-3: kvh
- Glottolog: komo1261 Komodo

The Komodo language (Wana Modo) is a language spoken by the present-day inhabitants of Komodo Island, with a small population of speakers on mainland Flores, as well as by the extinct Komodo people.

Komodo belongs to the Austronesian language family, and is a distinct and separate language from Manggarai.

In the Komodo language, the famous Komodo dragons are known as sebae 'twins', due to belief by the Komodo people that they share the same spiritual mother as the dragons.
