= Labuan Bajo =

- Town
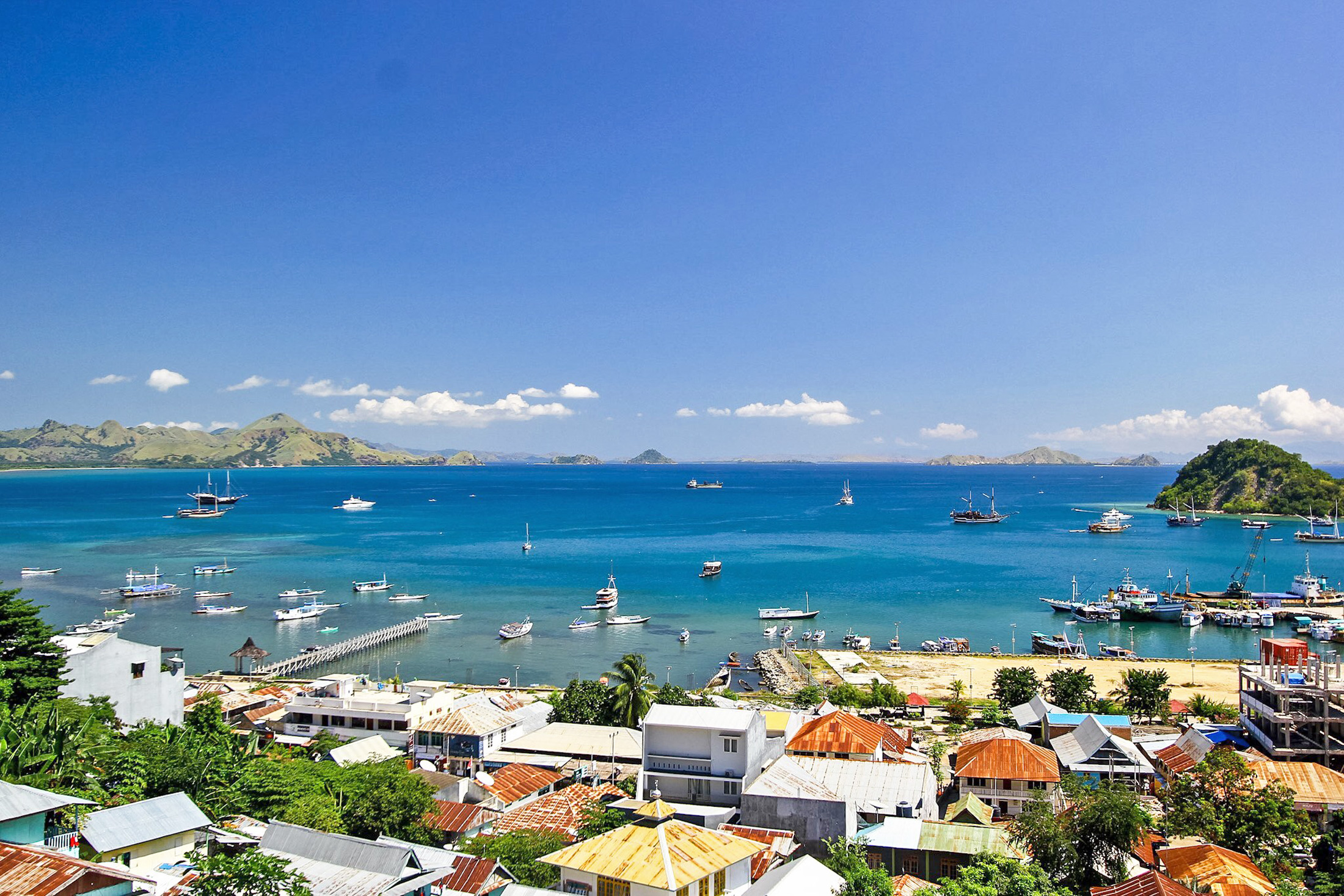
- View of the port of Labuan Bajo

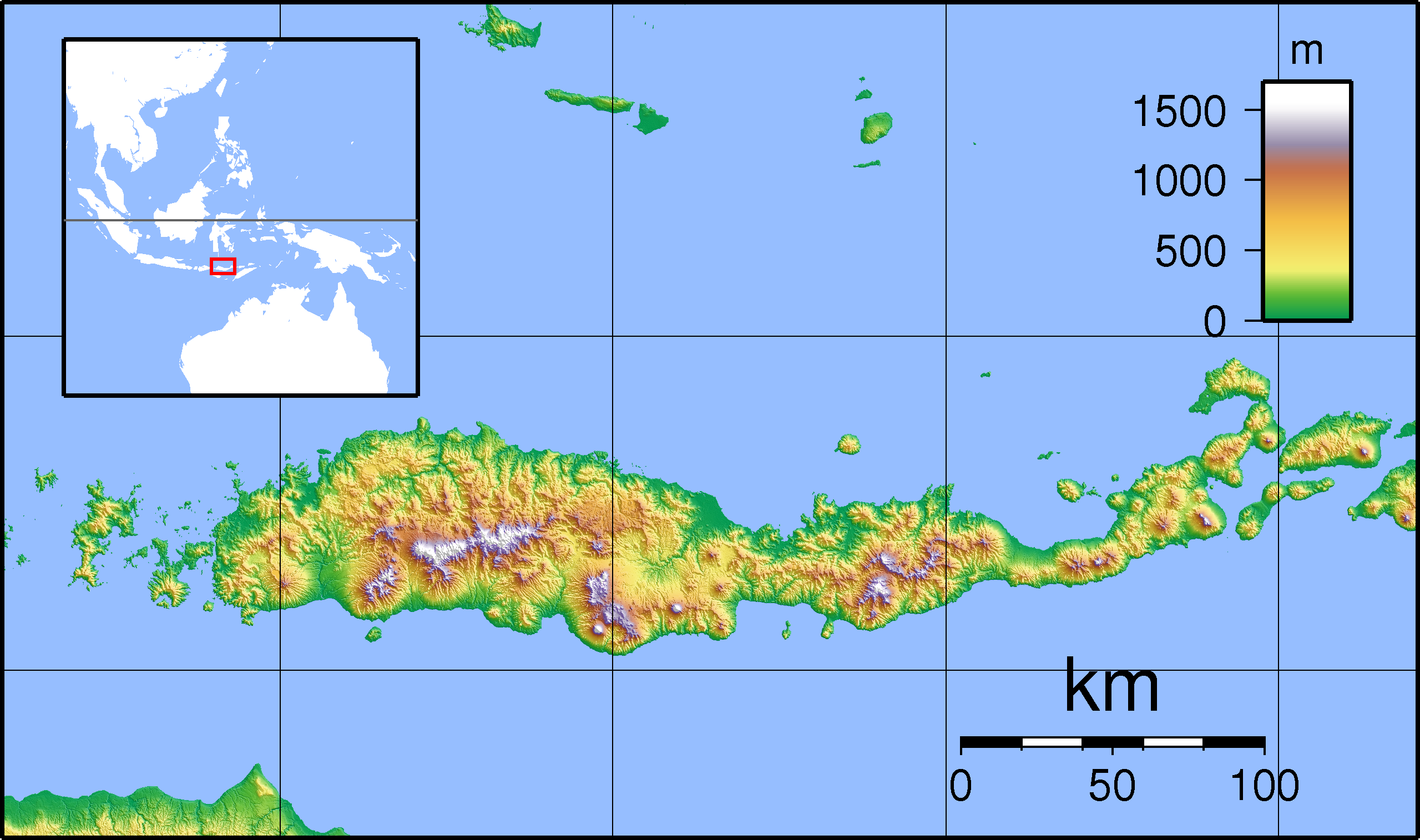
- Location in Indonesia Labuan Bajo (Indonesia)
- Coordinates: 8°30′S 119°53′E
- Country: Indonesia
- Region: Lesser Sunda Islands
- Province: East Nusa Tenggara
- Regency: West Manggarai

Area
  - Total: 11.65 km^{2} (4.50 sq mi)

Population (mid 2024 estimate)
  - Total: 7,226
  - Density: 620.3/km^{2} (1,606/sq mi)
- Time zone: UTC+8 (WITA)

Labuan Bajo (Indonesian pronunciation: [laˌbuan ˈbad͡ʒo]) is a fishing town located at the western end of the large island of Flores in the East Nusa Tenggara province of Indonesia. It is in Komodo District. It is the capital of the West Manggarai Regency, one of the eight regencies on Flores Island.

The urban area based on Labuan Bajo is chiefly composed of two urban kelurahan (Wae Kelambu and Labuan Bajo) and two nominally rural desa (Batu Cermin and Goron Talo. The areas and populations (as at mid 2024) of these communities are tabulated below.

Kode Wilayah	Name of kelurahan or desa	Area in km^{2}	Pop'n Estimate mid 2024
53.15.05.2019	Batu Cermin	6.41	7,502
53.15.05.2020	Goron Talo	6.23	7,866
53.15.05.1024	Wae Kelambu	14.49	8,793
53.15.05.1025	Labuan Bajo	11.65	7,226
53.15.05	Totals	38.78	31,387

== Toponymy ==
The name Labuan Bajo is taken from the town's harbour (labuan) and from the large number of Bajo people that live on the coast.

== Tourism ==
Once a small fishing village, Labuan Bajo (also spelled Labuhanbajo and Labuanbajo) is now a tourist center as well as a centre of government for the surrounding region. The roads link Labuan Bajo to other towns across Flores such as Ruteng, Bajawa, Ende and Maumere.
The town is small and can easily be traversed on foot in 15 minutes. Mirror stone cave (gua Batu cermin) is only 5 km north-east of the marina. Nearby Labuan Bajo are several waterfalls, trekking, and diverse beaches. Wae Rebo Village, 5 hours away by car and another 4.5 km on foot, can be visited to learn about the indigenous culture of the area. This World Heritage site is known for its traditional houses called Mbaru Niang.
Beside these, 19 other places around Labuan Bajo are frequently listed as touristic sites: Gili Laba, Rinca Island, Komodo Island, Kanawa Island, Padar Island, Lingko Rice Fields, Kelor Island, Kelimutu Lake, Ranko Cave, Cunca Lawang, Bena Traditional Village, Manta Point, Pink Beach, Bidadari Island, Seraya Island, Kalong Island, Melo Village, Pede Beach, and Sano Nggoang Lake. Altogether there are 128 islands (of which by far the largest are Komodo and Rinca Islands) within the Komodo District.

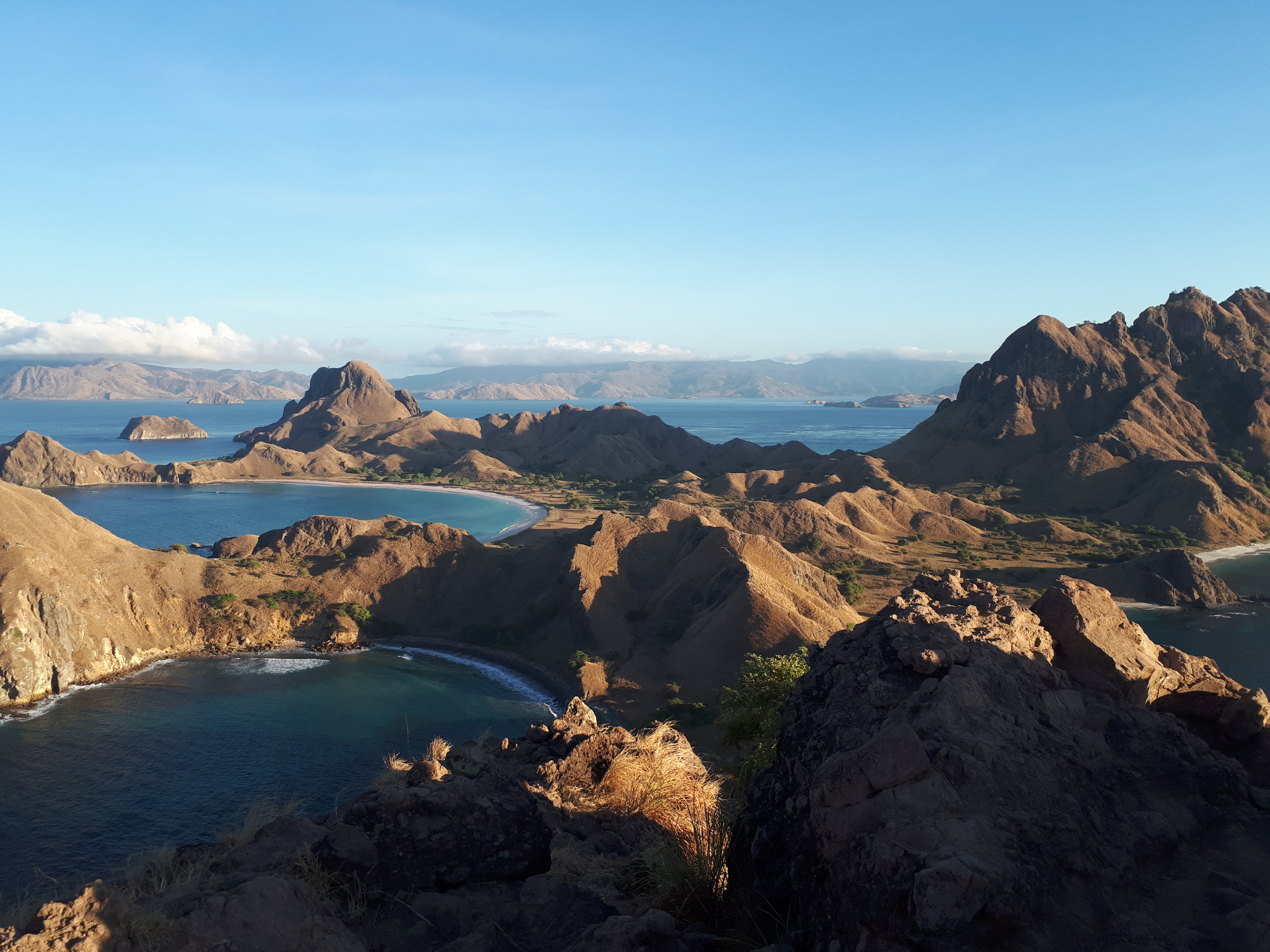
Padar island

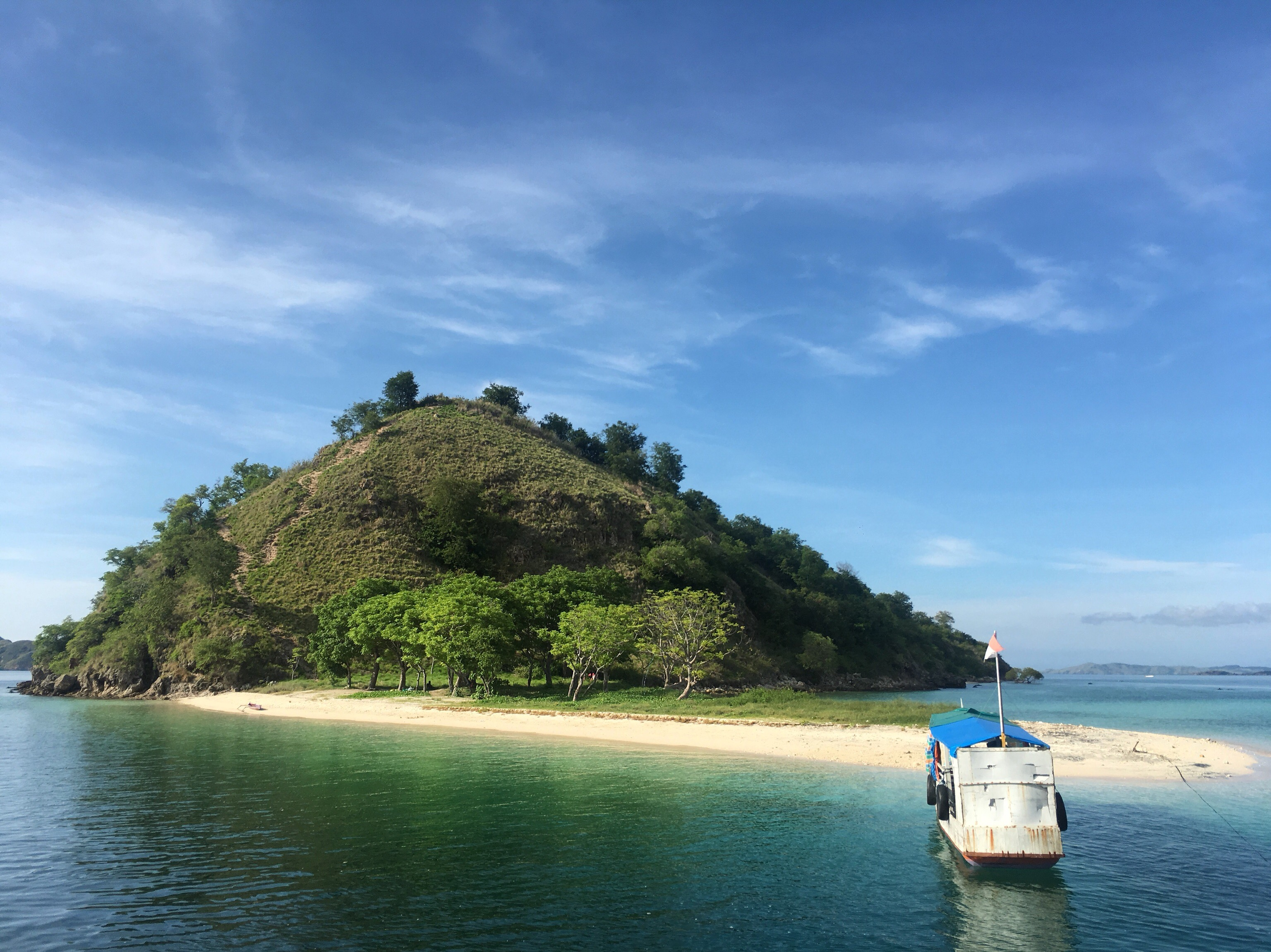
Kelor island

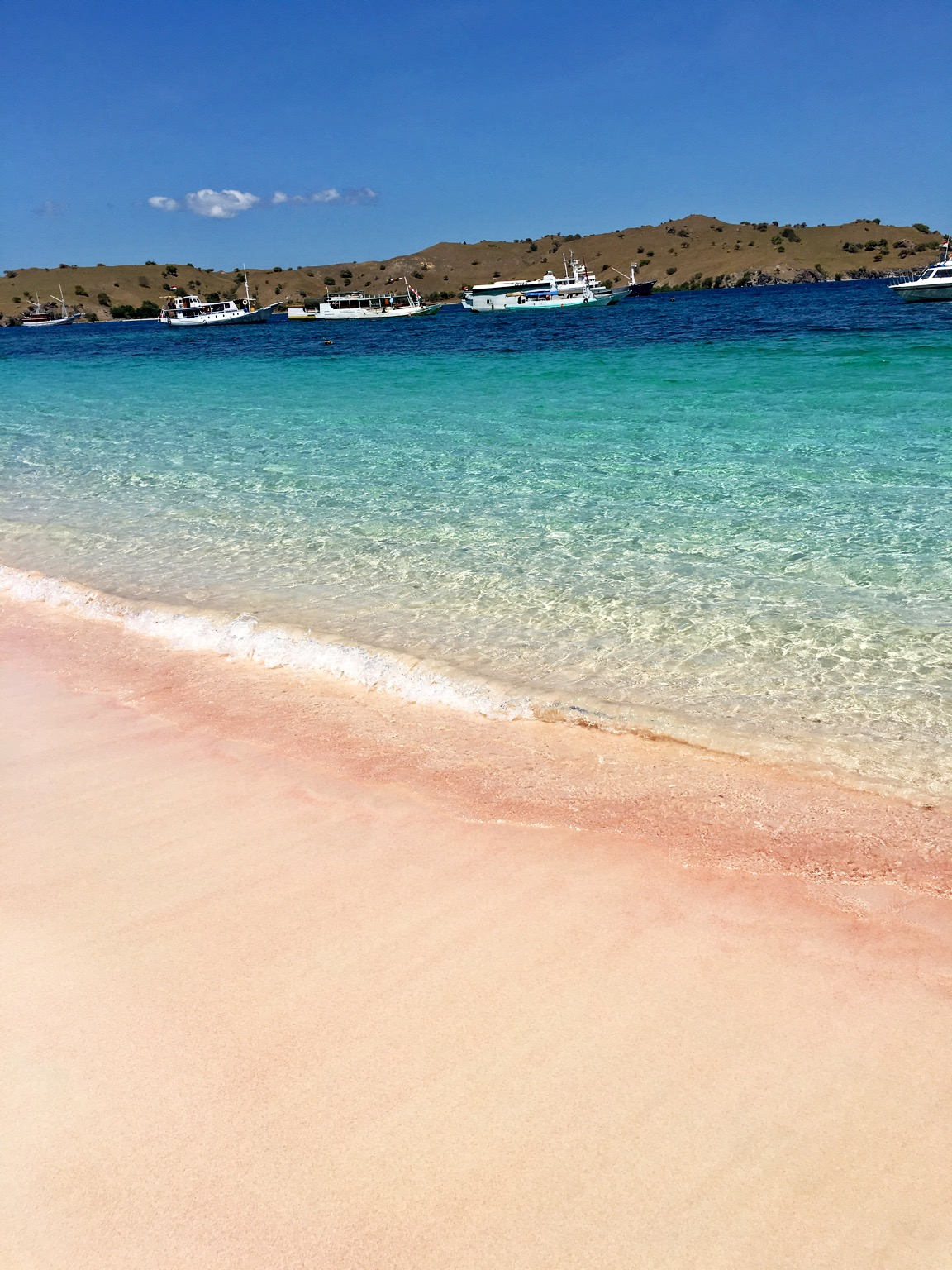
Pink beach

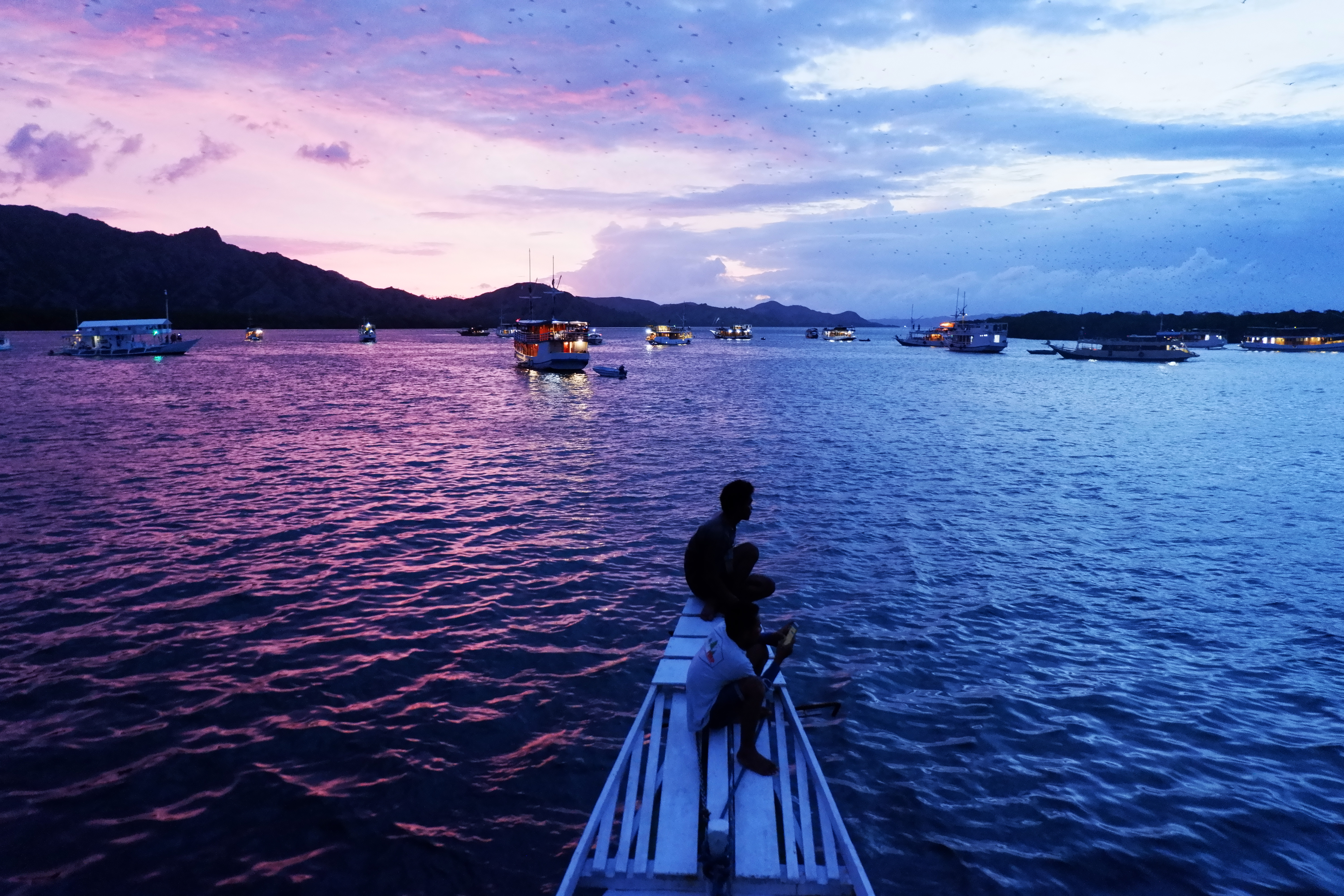
Bats and sunset at Kalong island

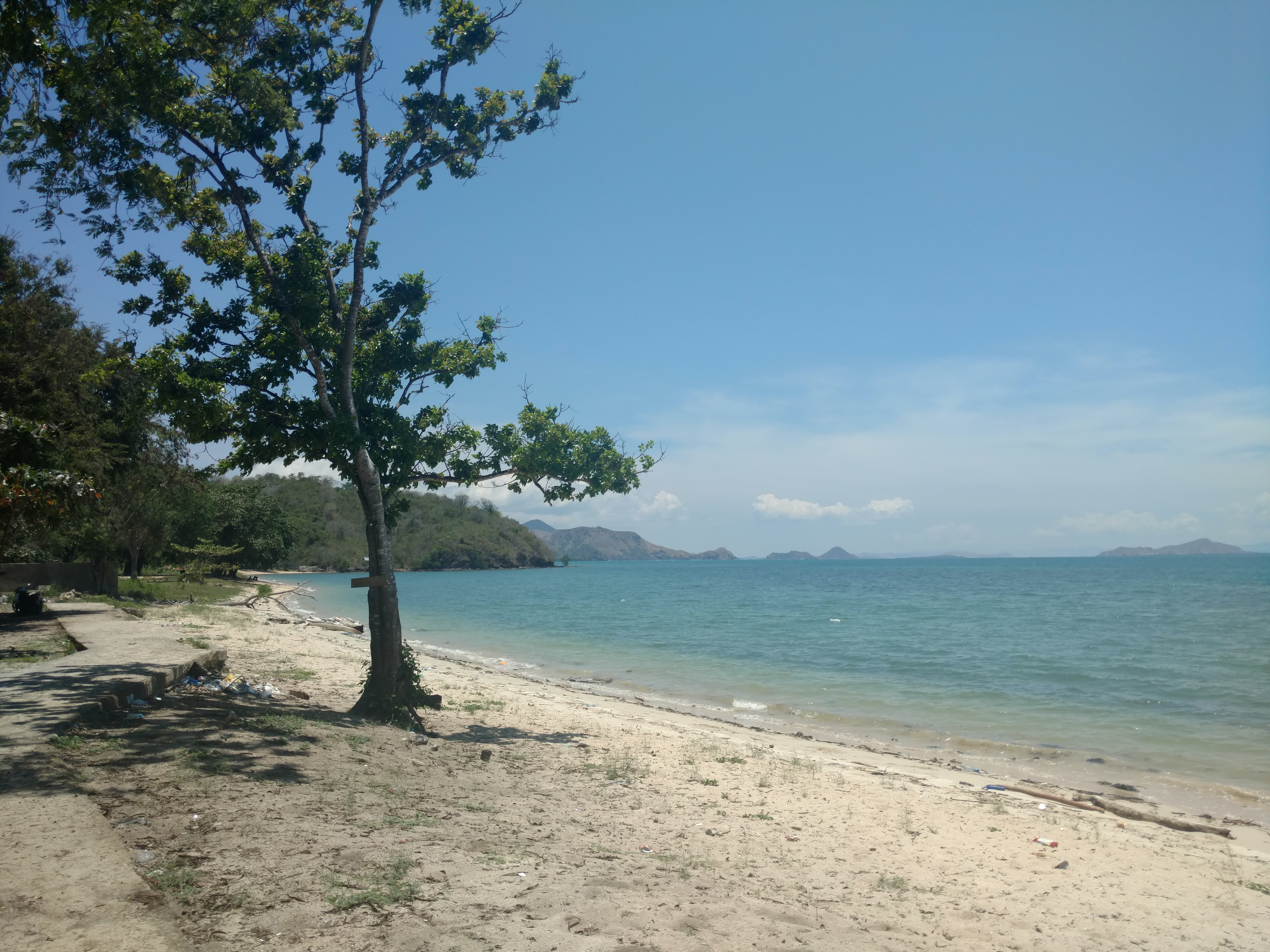
Pede beach

=== Komodo National Park ===
Labuan Bajo is the gateway to the nearby Komodo National Park on and around Komodo Island and Rinca Island, both home to the famous Komodo dragons. The park is a World Heritage Site. Its islands offer good scuba diving.

Every evening at Kalong Island (in the bay on the east side of Komodo island), thousands of flying fox bats (burung kalong in Indonesian) rise from the mangroves and form a massive cloud that crosses the strait to Flores Island in search of food.

=== Diving sites near Labuan Bajo ===
There are numerous diving sites in the islands close to Labuan Bajo - but in some places currents can be dangerously strong and much carefulness is required - notably at Batu Bolong site (whose name means "hole in the rock", in the Linta Strait), also called "Current City" for that reason To the north are Sabolon kecil, Sabolon besar and Seraya kecil; to the west are Sebayur (outside Komodo park), Tatawa besar and Tatawa kechil (within the park), Karang Makassar (Manta Point), Kanawa, Mauan, The Cauldron and many more.

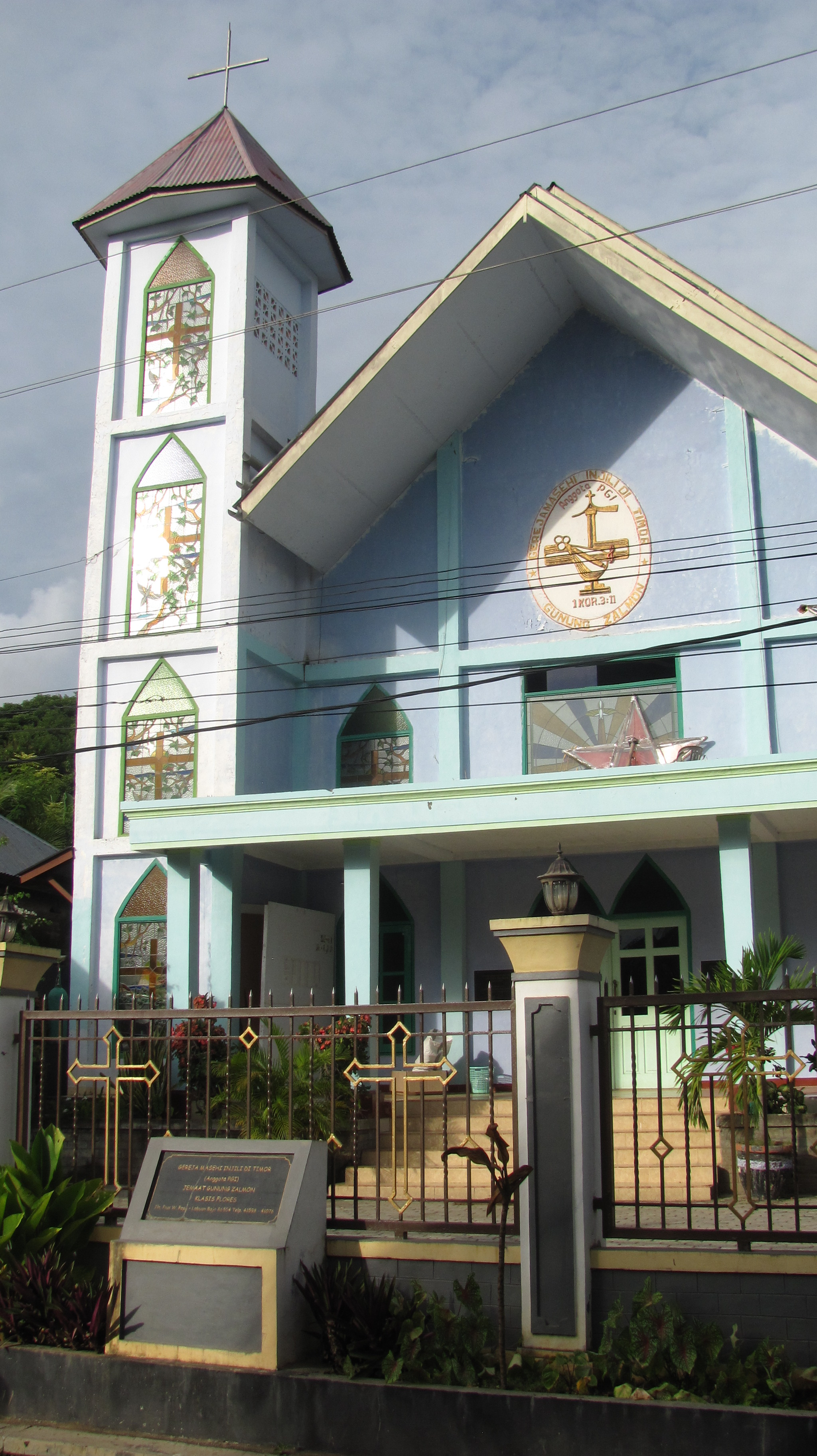
"Gereja Masehi Injili" Dutch reformed church

=== Tourism development ===
The location of Labuan Bajo at the tip of Flores Island makes it the initial destination for incoming tourists. It has been designated as a National Tourism Strategic Area (priority tourism destination) in the National Tourism Development Plan, and as one of five super-priority tourism destinations established by the Indonesian Presidency in 2018, with an emphasis on providing essential tourism infrastructure and accommodation for visitors. Facilities to support tourist activities are expanding quickly but the rapid rise in the numbers of visitors is imposing some strain on the local environment.

Thus accommodations have increased in the area: in 2019, it included 13 five-star hotels, 68 non-star hotels, 4 villas, and 26 dormitories. This has considerably increased the built-up surface, with a growth of 161 ha between 2011 and 2017, another 246 ha between 2017 and 2023, and it is expected to grow by 267 ha again by 2029. Tourism development has been further encouraged by the Indonesian Government declaring Labuan Bajo one of the "ten new Balis" and "five super priority tourism destinations" being developed to reduce the overtourism of Bali.

This is despite the fact that the area is prone to natural disasters, including tsunamis, earthquakes and landslides. These extreme natural phenomena are known to have a negative impact on the number of tourists and the tourist experience, and to have a greater influence on the number of tourists than man-made disasters such as terrorist attacks.

Environmental effects

The development of the area brings a mounting trash problem. The Komodo National Park and its surrounding area, including the coastal area of Labuan Bajo, could compile an average of 13 tons of trash in one day, of which 35 to 40 percent is inorganic waste that contains saleable plastic waste.

There are also the matters of illegal fishing and coral vulnerability. However, the basis of the decision regarding what is legal and illegal may be questioned: the local community has been fishing in these waters for centuries and did no damage; but since the creation of the national park, they have been outlawed, and have been excluded from the decision-taking entities. In the later part of 20th century, some fishermen did start using destructive methods such as explosives or chemicals; explosives are still used as of 2024.

Socioeconomic effects

Stating that tourism development has caused a great impact on the local economy is certainly true, but not necessarily positive. A 2023 documentary by Dandhy Laksono has highlighted problems such as marginalization of local people, denial of indigenous peoples' rights, privatization of coastal areas and water resources, destruction of forests, control by big business players with strong political connections, and the resistance by residents to defend their living space. Thus tourism developments in Labuan Bajo offers little benefit to the local people; they are designed for outsiders and the interests of local residents are neglected. One tourist guide observed that "several corporations have obtained permits to open hotels and resorts over hundreds of hectares. One day big companies will control Komodo Island"; and he predicts that "ten years from now (2023), the Ata Modo indigenous people that inhabit Komodo Island will be reduced to living in cramped spaces." Those people have lived on Komodo island for over a thousand years, but in the name of tourism development the gouvernment has declared them to be "wild settlers" and wants them out: in the national park, "There will be no human rights, only animal rights," says governor Victor Laiskodat Which raises questions about the existence of the luxury Komodo resort (Note: Komodo resort on Sebayur Besar island is owned by PT Delos International Bali and J&J Neptune Alliance Limited, who also cover (independently of conjointly) the trademarks Komodo Resort, Komodo Sea Dragon, Neptune Scuba Diving, Hilltop Komodo Resort, Neptune One, Neptune Liveaboards and others.) on Sebayur Besar island.
Land speculation and sell-out is rife. In regard to employment, tourism development has created job opportunities for the local population; but a 2017 assessment underlined the low wages, (Note: In 2017 32 per cent of interviewed businesses paid below the minimum wage and the majority paid around the minimum wage.) the high proportion of businesses which do not fully comply with labour laws, insufficient provision of social security throughout the industry and a lack of structured efforts in staff training - which limits career perspectives. All in all, the revenue increase often touted for the area does not globally profit the local population and the contribution to poverty reduction remains marginal; nor is there any indication for infrastructural improvements which benefit the local population in significant ways.

One aspect of this tourism development is the increase of imbalance between the well-developed centre of Indonesia and its lesser developed periphery. Only one third of business owners are Flores people, and they mostly own small businesses with low margins who face the strongest competition, such as budget accommodations and tour operators. The large proportion of ownership by outsiders, in conjunction with these outsiders owning the businesses with the highest profits, presents a significant source of financial leakage. This assessment was published in 2017. Since then the leakage situation has worsened: there has been the opening in September 2018 of the first five-star luxury resort Ayana Komodo (205 rooms), a Marriott hotel with the Ta'aktana resort, AccorHotels, Alila and possibly others.

== Transport ==
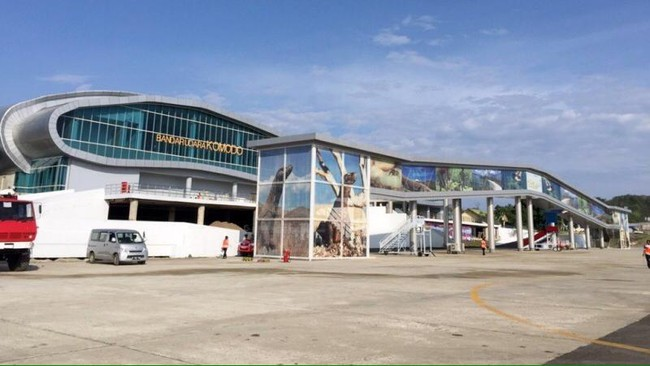
Komodo Airport

Labuan Bajo is served by Komodo International Airport, approximately 3 km from the town centre. Public ferry services connect Labuan Bajo on Flores Island with Sape on Sumbawa, carrying both foot passengers and vehicles between the two islands.

== Climate ==
Labuan Bajo has a dry "winter" tropical savanna climate (Aw), with moderate to little rainfall from April to November and heavy rainfall from December to March.

Climate data for Labuan Bajo
Month	Jan	Feb	Mar	Apr	May	Jun	Jul	Aug	Sep	Oct	Nov	Dec	Year
Mean daily maximum °C (°F)	30.4 (86.7)	29.8 (85.6)	30.5 (86.9)	31.0 (87.8)	30.8 (87.4)	30.4 (86.7)	30.4 (86.7)	30.9 (87.6)	31.5 (88.7)	31.9 (89.4)	31.5 (88.7)	30.7 (87.3)	30.8 (87.5)
Daily mean °C (°F)	25.6 (78.1)	25.3 (77.5)	25.7 (78.3)	25.8 (78.4)	25.3 (77.5)	24.7 (76.5)	24.1 (75.4)	24.4 (75.9)	25.2 (77.4)	26.0 (78.8)	26.5 (79.7)	26.0 (78.8)	25.4 (77.7)
Mean daily minimum °C (°F)	20.9 (69.6)	20.9 (69.6)	20.9 (69.6)	20.6 (69.1)	19.9 (67.8)	19.0 (66.2)	17.9 (64.2)	17.9 (64.2)	18.9 (66.0)	20.2 (68.4)	21.5 (70.7)	21.3 (70.3)	20.0 (68.0)
Average rainfall mm (inches)	291 (11.5)	274 (10.8)	196 (7.7)	103 (4.1)	80 (3.1)	42 (1.7)	25 (1.0)	24 (0.9)	21 (0.8)	46 (1.8)	118 (4.6)	205 (8.1)	1,425 (56.1)
Source: Climate-Data.org
