= West Manggarai Regency =

Regency in East Nusa Tenggara, Indonesia

West Manggarai Regency Kabupaten Manggarai Barat
- Regency
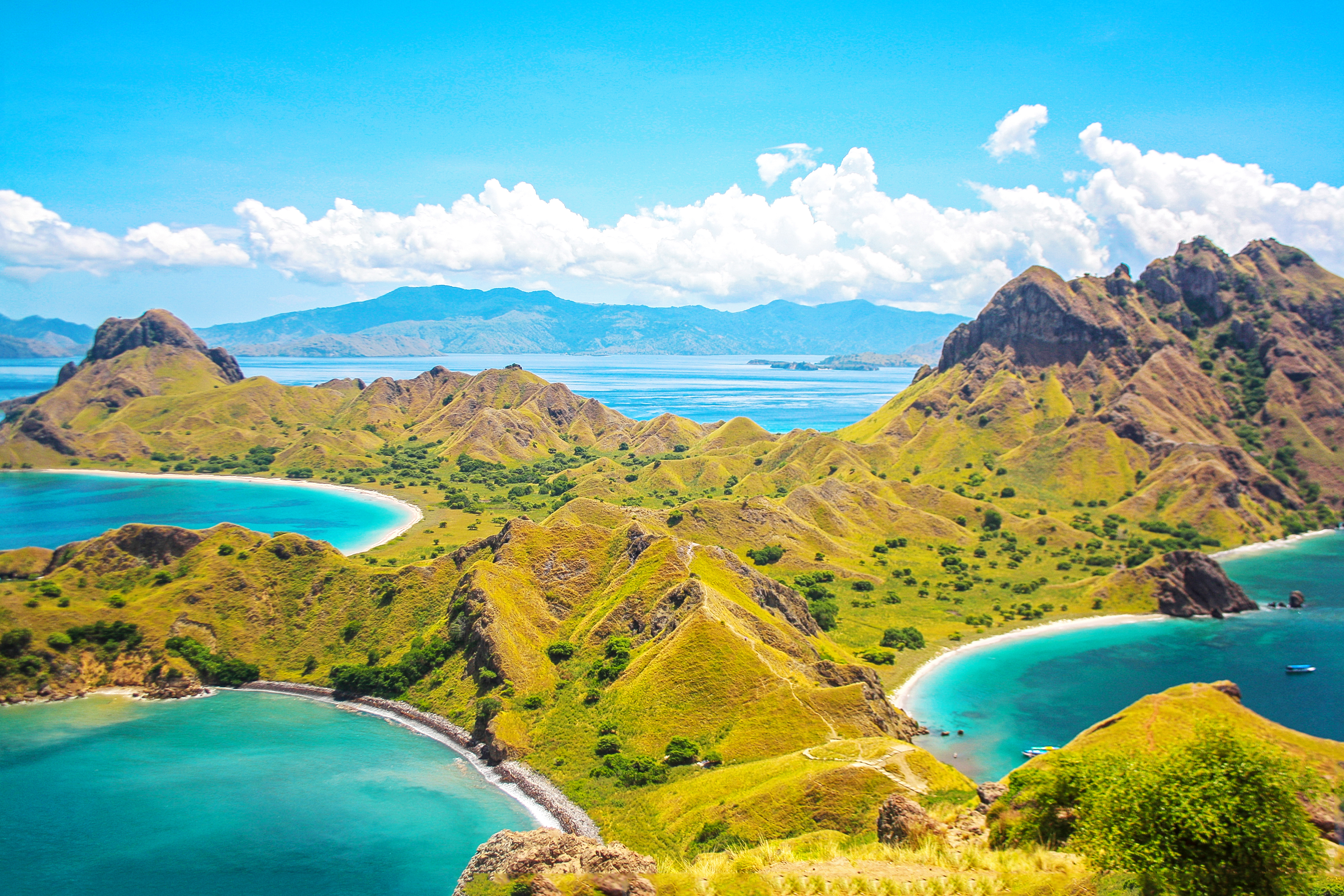
- Padar, Komodo Island

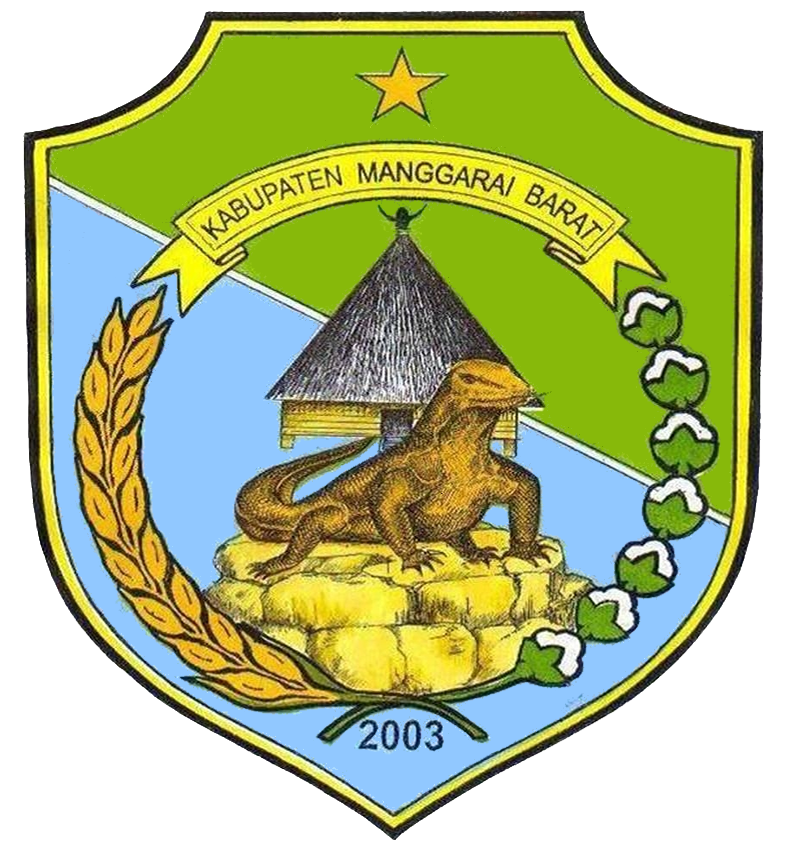
- Coat of arms

- Location within East Nusa Tenggara

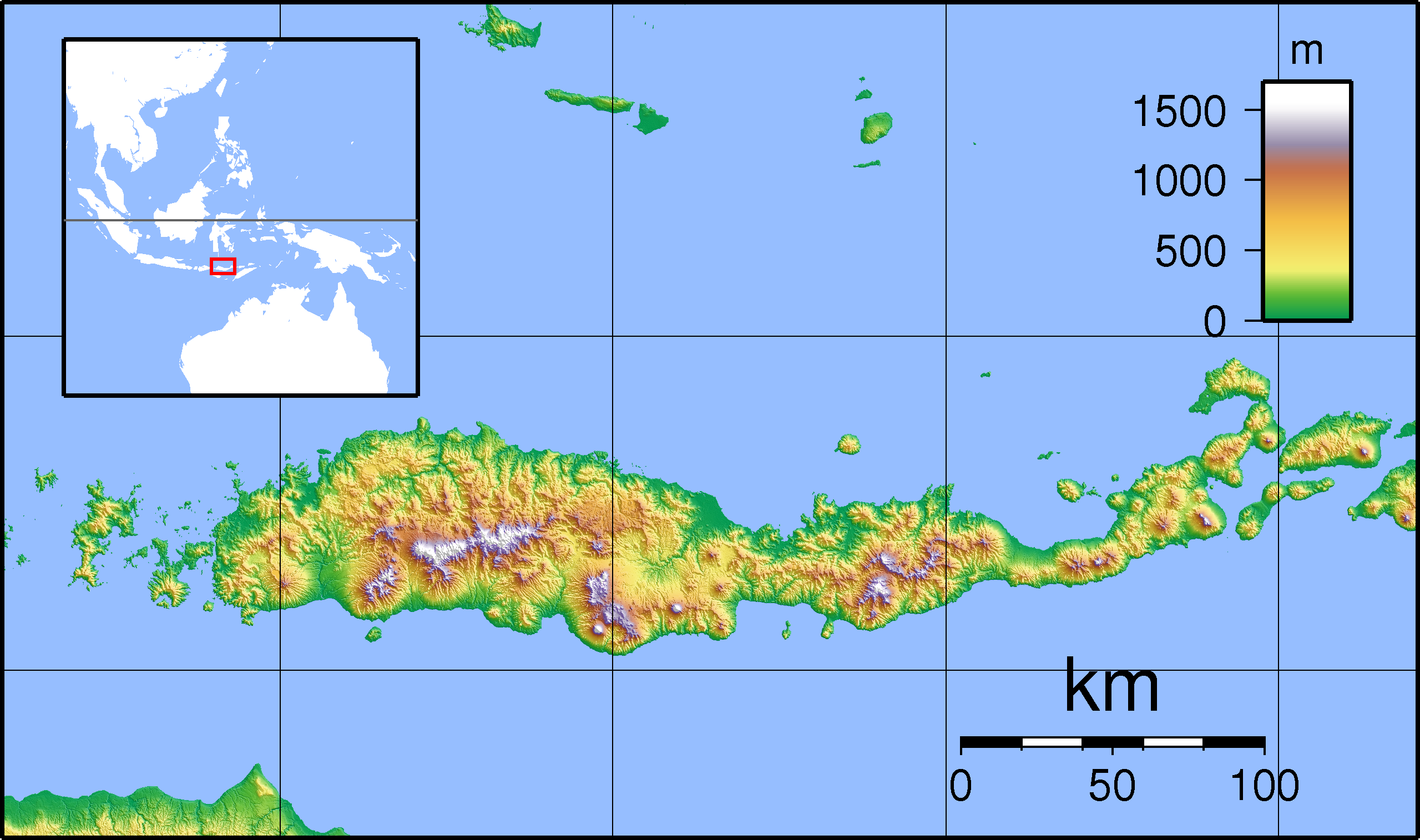
- Location in Flores, Lesser Sunda Islands and Indonesia West Manggarai Regency (Lesser Sunda Islands) West Manggarai Regency (Indonesia)
- Coordinates: 8.6448°S 119.8828°E
- Country: Indonesia
- Province: East Nusa Tenggara
- Established: 25 February 2003
- Capital: Labuan Bajo

Government
  - Regent: Edistasius Endi
  - Vice Regent: Yulianus Weng

Area
  - Total: 3,129.00 km^{2} (1,208.11 sq mi)

Population (mid 2025 estimate)
  - Total: 281,692
  - Density: 90.0262/km^{2} (233.167/sq mi)
- Time zone: UTC+8 (ICST)
- Area code: (+62) 385
- Website: manggaraibaratkab.go.id

West Manggarai Regency (Indonesian: Kabupaten Manggarai Barat) is one of the eight regencies which comprise the island of Flores, located in the province of East Nusa Tenggara (Nusa Tenggara Timur) in Indonesia. The Regency was created on 25 February 2003 by the separation off of the western districts from Manggarai Regency. It covers a land area of 3,129.00 km^{2}, and had a population of 221,703 at the 2010 census, rising to 251,689 at the 2015 Intermediate census and to 256,317 at the 2020 census. The official estimate as of mid-2025 was 281,692 (comprising 141,320 males and 140,372 females). The regency's capital is the town of Labuan Bajo.

== Geography ==
The regency includes the western portion of Flores island (Pulau Flores) and several small islands mainly lying to the west of it, including the two largest islands, Komodo (Pulau Komodo) and Rinca (Pulau Rinca) as well as others such as Greater Seraya (Pulau Seraya Besar), Lesser Seraya (Pulau Seraya Kecil), Bidadari (Pulau Bidadari) and Longgos (Pulau Longgos). The total area of West Manggarai Regency is 10,179.00 square kilometres (3,930.13 sq mi), consisting of a land area of 3,129.00 square kilometres (1,208.11 sq mi) and a sea area of 7,050 square kilometres (2,720 sq mi).

== Administration ==
At the time of the 2010 census West Manggarai Regency was divided into seven districts (kecamatan), but a further five districts have subsequently been created by the division of existing districts. These are tabulated below with their areas and their 2010 and 2020 census populations, together with the official estimates as of mid-2025. The table also includes the locations of the district administrative centres, the number of administrative villages in each district (totaling 164 rural desa and 5 urban kelurahan), and its post code. Altogether there are 242 named islands off the coast of West Manggarai Regency, of which the two largest (Komodo and Rinca) with smaller islands form the Komodo National Park.

Kode Wilayah	Name of District (kecamatan)	Land area in km^{2}	Pop'n census 2010	Pop'n census 2020	Pop'n estimate mid 2025	Admin centre	No. of villages	Post code
53.15.05	Komodo ^{(a)}	986.84	41,258	53,724	62,448	Labuan Bajo	19 ^{(b)}	86763
53.15.06	Boleng ^{(c)}	294.43	16,567	18,925	20,648	Terang	11	86754
53.15.04	Sano Nggoang	202.18	25,113	14,229	15,126	Werang	15	86758
53.15.10	Mbeliling	280.44	^{(d)}	13,758	15,056	Warsawe	15	86757
53.15.03	Lembor	202.08	49,732	33,653	37,018	Wae Nakeng	15 ^{(e)}	86753
53.15.07	Welak	146.14	19,100	21,389	23,112	Orong	16	86762
53.15.09	Lembor Selatan (South Lembor)	363.13	^{(f)}	23,461	25,460	Lengkong Cepang	15	86761
53.15.02	Kuwus	54.04	40,365	13,673	14,434	Golo Welu	12 ^{(g)}	86752
53.15.08	Ndoso	123.82	^{(h)}	20,032	21,421	Ndoso	15	86750
53.15.12	Kuwus Barat (West Kurus)	40.14	^{(h)}	10,695	11,722	Landong	10	86751
53.15.01	Macang Pacar ^{(i)}	264.88	29,568	15,936	17,056	Bari	13	86756
53.15.11	Pacar	170.86	^{(j)}	16,842	18,191	Pacar	13	86755
	Totals	3,129.00	221,703	256,317	281,692	Labuan Bajo	169	

Notes: (a) includes the 139 islands off the west coast of Flores, of which the largest are Komodo and Rinca; the district also includes the most westerly part of the Flores mainland, including the regency capital of Labuan Bajo and the entire west coast of Flores.
(b) including two kelurahan - Labuan Bajo and Wae Kelambu - and 17 desa.
(c) includes the offshore islands of Pulau Boleng and Pulau Longos.
(d) The 2010 census population quoted for Sanonggoang District includes the figure for the new Mbeliling District, cut out of it between 2010 and 2015.
(e) including one kelurahan - Tangge. (f) The 2010 census population quoted for Lembor District includes the figure for the new Lembor Selatan District, cut out of it in the same period.
(g) including 2 kelurahan - Golo Ru'u and Nantal. (h) The 2010 census population quoted for Kuwus District includes the figure for the new Ndoso District, cut out of it in the same period, while the 2010 census population quoted for Kuwus District additionally includes the figure for the new Kuwus Barat District, cut out of it in 2018.
(i) includes the offshore islands of Pulau Medang and Pulau Sebabi.
(j) The 2010 census population quoted for Macang Pacar District includes the figure for the new Pacar District, cut out of it in 2018.

== Demographics ==
=== Religion ===
Most of the population of West Manggarai Regency are Christians, amounting to 78.56%, of which the majority are Catholics (77.76%) and Protestants (0.80%). There is also a large proportion of the population who adhere to Islam (21.39%), while the rest are Hindus (0.4%) and Buddhists (less than 0.01%).

Religion in West Manggarai Regency
Religion	percent
Catholicism	77.76%
Islam	21.39%
Protestantism	0.80%
Hinduism	0.04%
Other	0.01%

=== Ethnic groups ===
The Manggarai people are the majority and native population of West Manggarai Regency. They speak the Manggarai language, which consists of several dialects. In addition, there are also Komodo people who live on the Komodo Island, to the west, but their population is known to be extinct. Where the current population is a mixture of Bimanese, Manggarai, Buginese, Makassarese, and Bajau peoples. The Bajau people are known to have migrated from the Sulu Archipelago in what is now the Philippines, where they mostly inhabit Labuan Bajo and Komodo Island in West Manggarai.

No.	Ethnic groups	Proportion (%)
1	Manggarai	84.13%
2	Buginese	5.48%
3	Bimanese	4.45%
4	Javanese	3.20%
5	Bajau	0.64%
6	Others	2.10%

Notes: "Others" is a classification of various other ethnic groups that are not recorded (2010 census).

== Development issues ==
Rural development

The West Manggarai Regency, along with other nearby regencies on Flores, has a long and hot dry season. Programs of tree-planting have been initiated in recent years which are helping improve the local environment. These activities include efforts to promote continued attention to the cultivation of sugar palms (Arenga pinnata).

Education

Education facilities in the region are limited, especially in the outlying areas. Some non-government organisations help, for example, with the provision of books for children to isolated villages.

Tourism

Various local community groups in different parts of the regency work to promote the local tourist industry through, for example, the development of local dance troupes and foods from local areas. In Liang Ndara village, which has been designated as a tourist site, there are programs to teach English in the local community to support the tourist industry,

Mount Mbeliling (Indonesian: Gunung Mbeliling), one of the highest peaks in the regency (1,325 meters) is a well-known destination for climbers and tourists to the regency. The area around Mt Mbeliling, which is rich in bird life, attracts bird-watching groups.

== Tourism ==
=== Sano Nggoang ===
Sano (means Mount) Nggoang is 513 hectares (1.9 sq. mi.) of volcanic crater lake with depth of around 600 meters (1968.5 ft.), the deepest lake of its kind in the world.

=== Shark and manta ray sanctuary ===
In late August 2013, the local authority designated all regency's marine and coastal waters up to 12 nautical miles offshore (which occupied 7,000 square kilometres in area) as a shark and manta ray sanctuary (includes the sea around Komodo Island).

=== Komodo National Park ===
The national park was founded in 1980 to protect the Komodo dragon, the world's largest lizard. In 1991 the national park was declared a UNESCO World Heritage Site.

== See also ==
- Kokotuku Peninsula
