= Rinca =

Island in Indonesia

Native name: Pulau Rinca
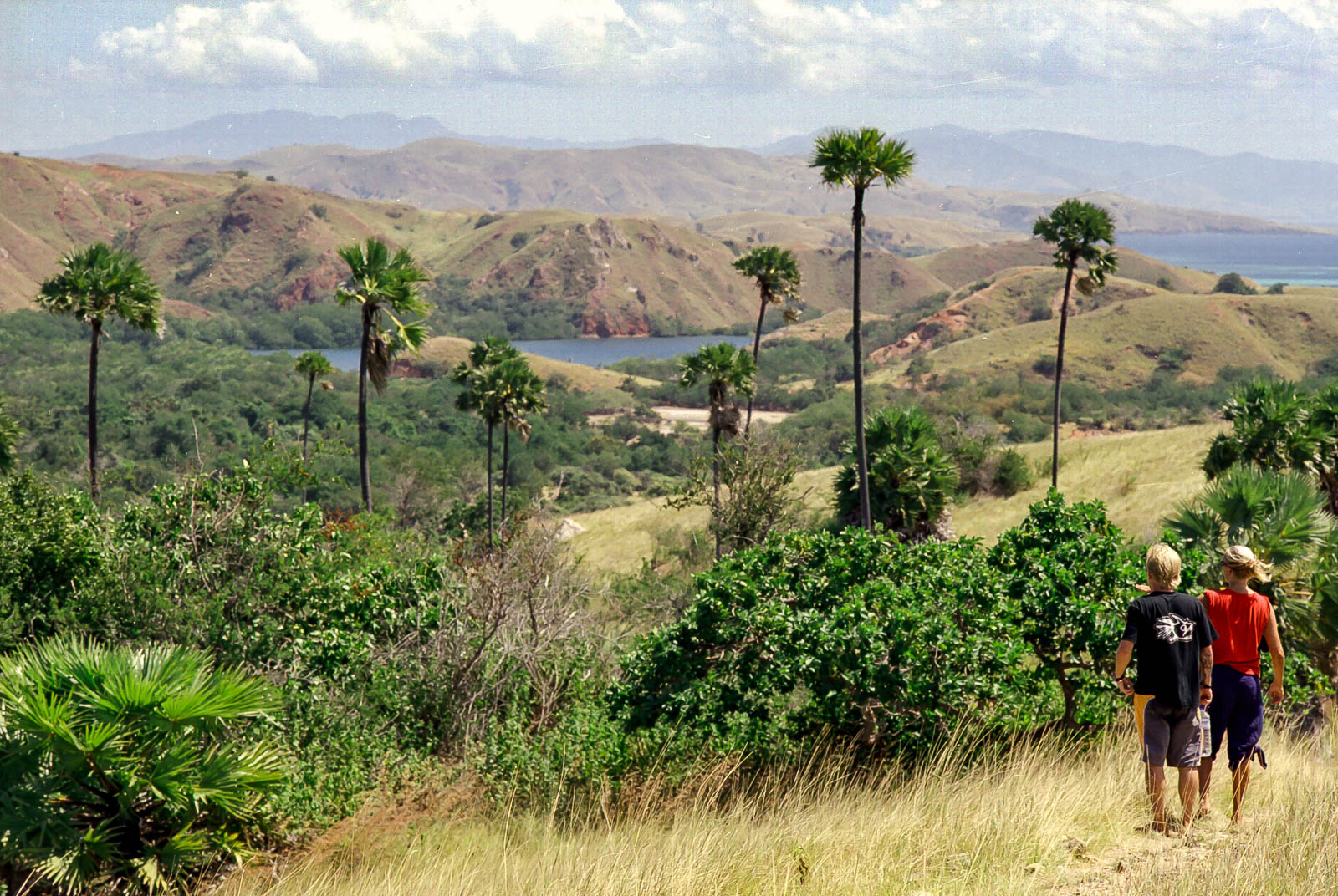
- Rinca island

- Location within Indonesia

Geography
- Location: Maritime Southeast Asia
- Coordinates: 8.70°S 119.68°E
- Archipelago: Lesser Sunda Islands
- Area: 182.48 km^{2} (70.46 sq mi)

Administration
- Indonesia
- Province: East Nusa Tenggara

Demographics
- Population: 1,747 (in 2020)
- Pop. density: 9.6/km^{2} (24.9/sq mi)

Rinca (Note: Also known as Rincah, Rindja, Rintja and Pintja; Indonesian pronunciation: [ˈrint͡ʃa]) is a small island near Komodo and Flores island, East Nusa Tenggara, Indonesia, within the West Manggarai Regency. It is one of the three largest islands included in Komodo National Park. The island is famous for Komodo dragons, giant lizards that can measure up to 3 metres (9.8 ft) long. Rinca is also populated with many other species such as wild pigs, buffalos and many birds.

== Area ==
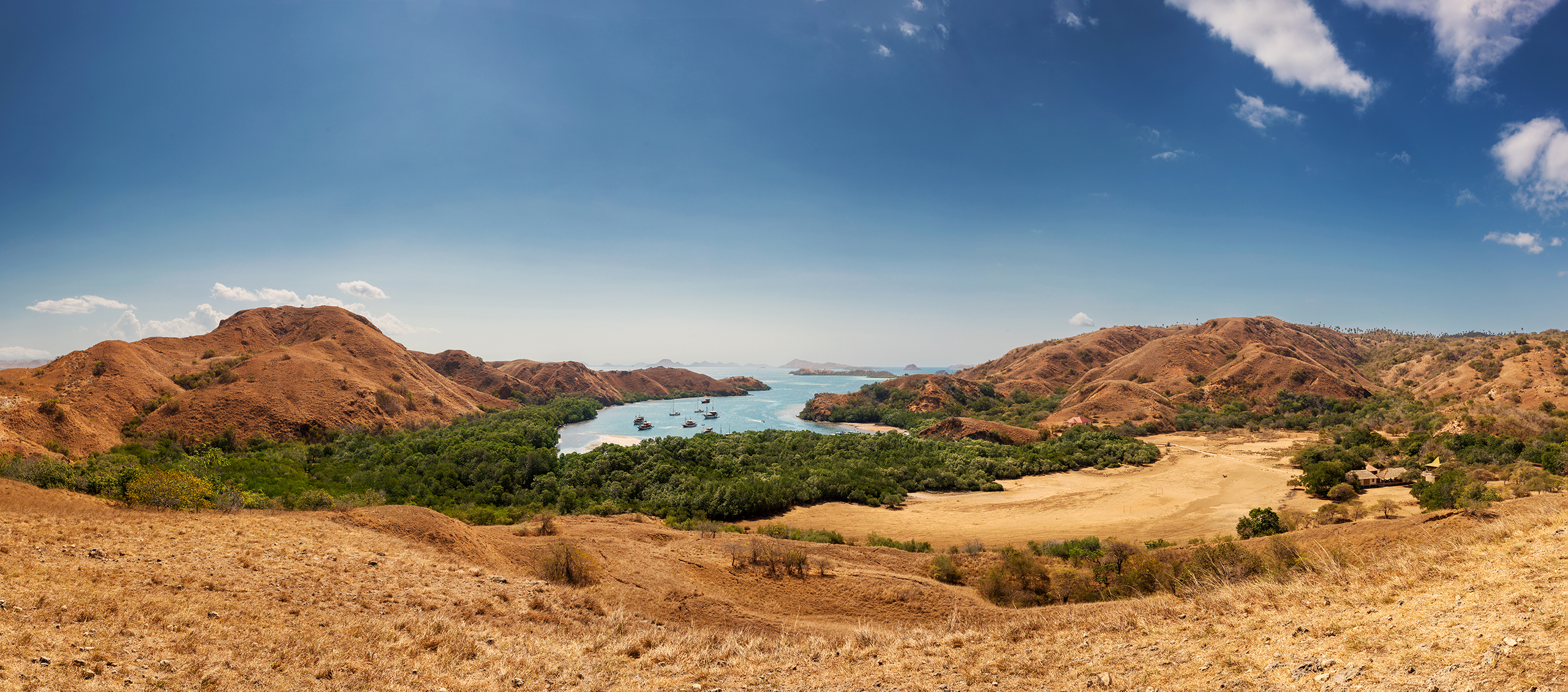
Panorama of Rinca

The island's area is 182.48 square kilometres (70.46 sq mi).

== Living conditions ==
Living conditions for local people on the island are often difficult. Education facilities, for example, are quite limited for children. Some non-government organisations help with the provision of books for children on Rinca. Local people must also take some care to avoid Komodo dragons because Komodos in the area occasionally attack and kill humans.

== Sea conditions ==
Rinca and Komodo Islands bracket a north–south passage between the Indian Ocean and the Flores Sea. Due to the large bodies of water and narrow gap, the waters between Rinca and Komodo are subject to whirlpools and currents in excess of 10 knots.

Diving in the region requires care. In June 2008, five scuba divers (three British, one French and one Swedish) were found on the southern coast of Rinca after having been missing for 2 days. The group had drifted 20 miles (32 km) from where their dive boat abandoned them. They survived on oysters and other shellfish.

== Fauna ==
Being less known and less visited than Komodo Island, Rinca is a good place to see the Komodo dragon in its natural environment with fewer people to disturb them. Day trips can be arranged to the Loh Buaya park facility on Rinca Island from Labuan Bajo on Flores by small boat at the park headquarters. A jetty marks the entrance to the park facility. A short walk leads to the local park office where there are rangers to accompany visitors on short or medium-length walks to see komodos and other animals such as monkeys, deer and buffalos.

== See also ==
- Sape Strait

== Gallery ==
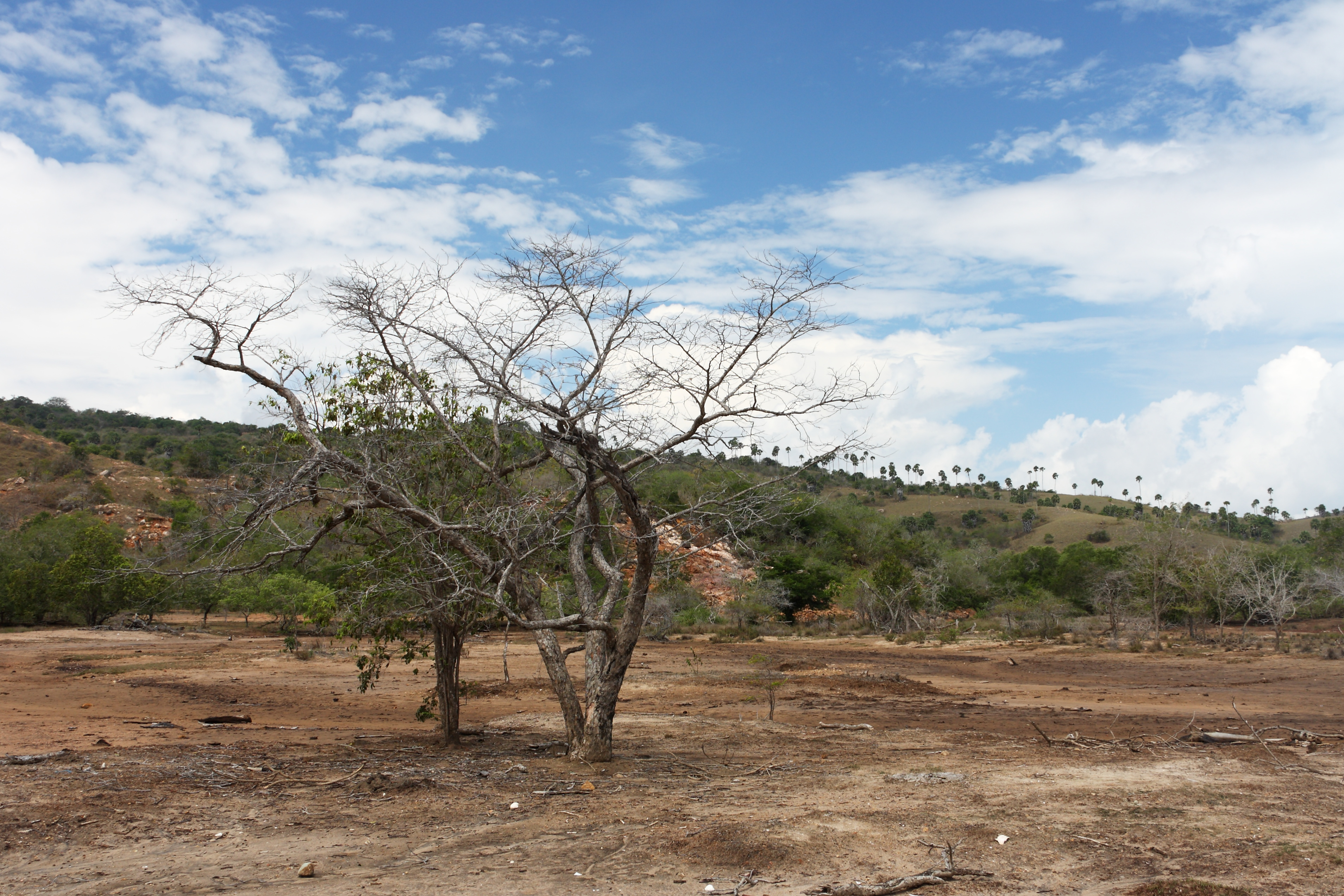
Dry season at Rinca

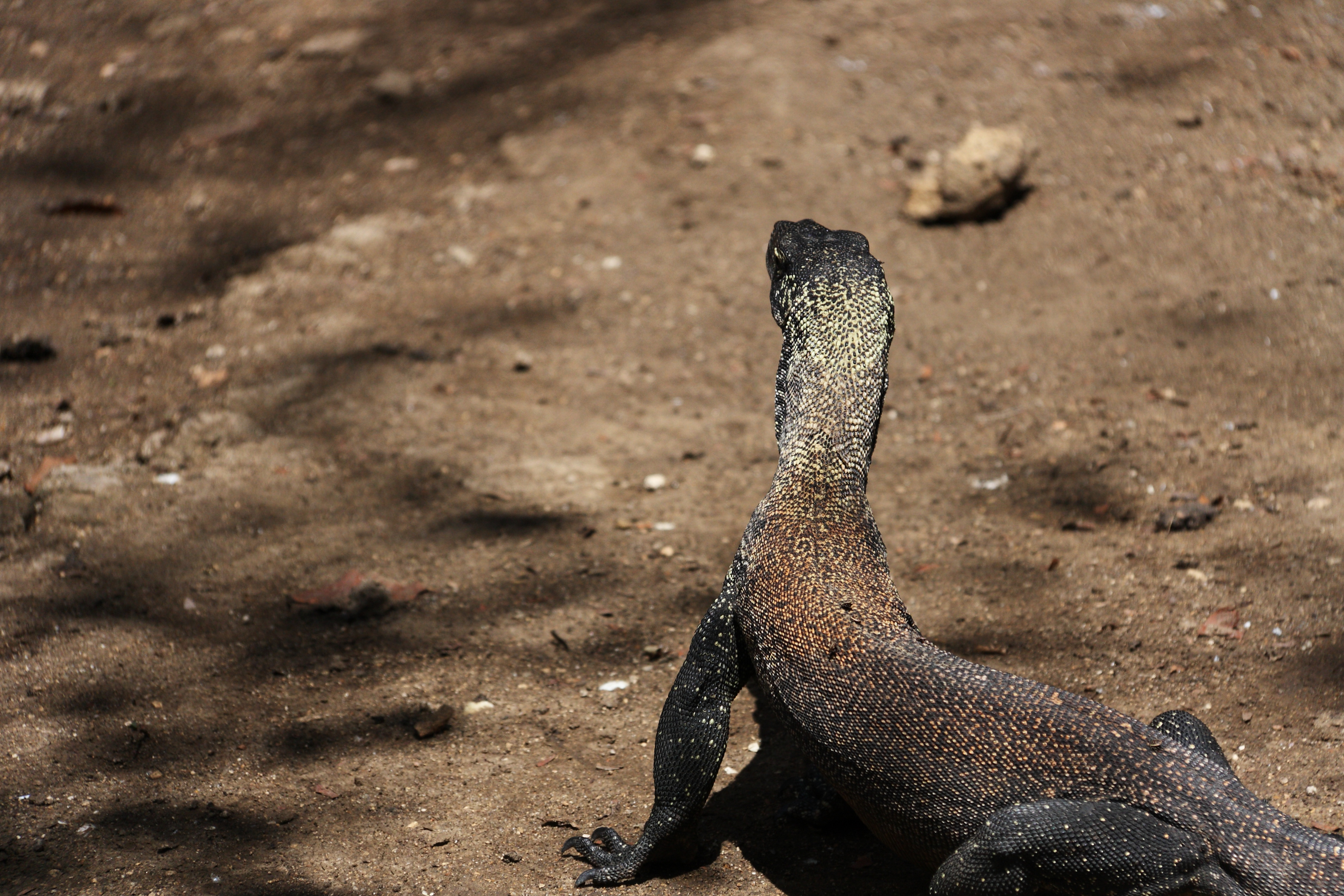
Juvenile Komodo dragon

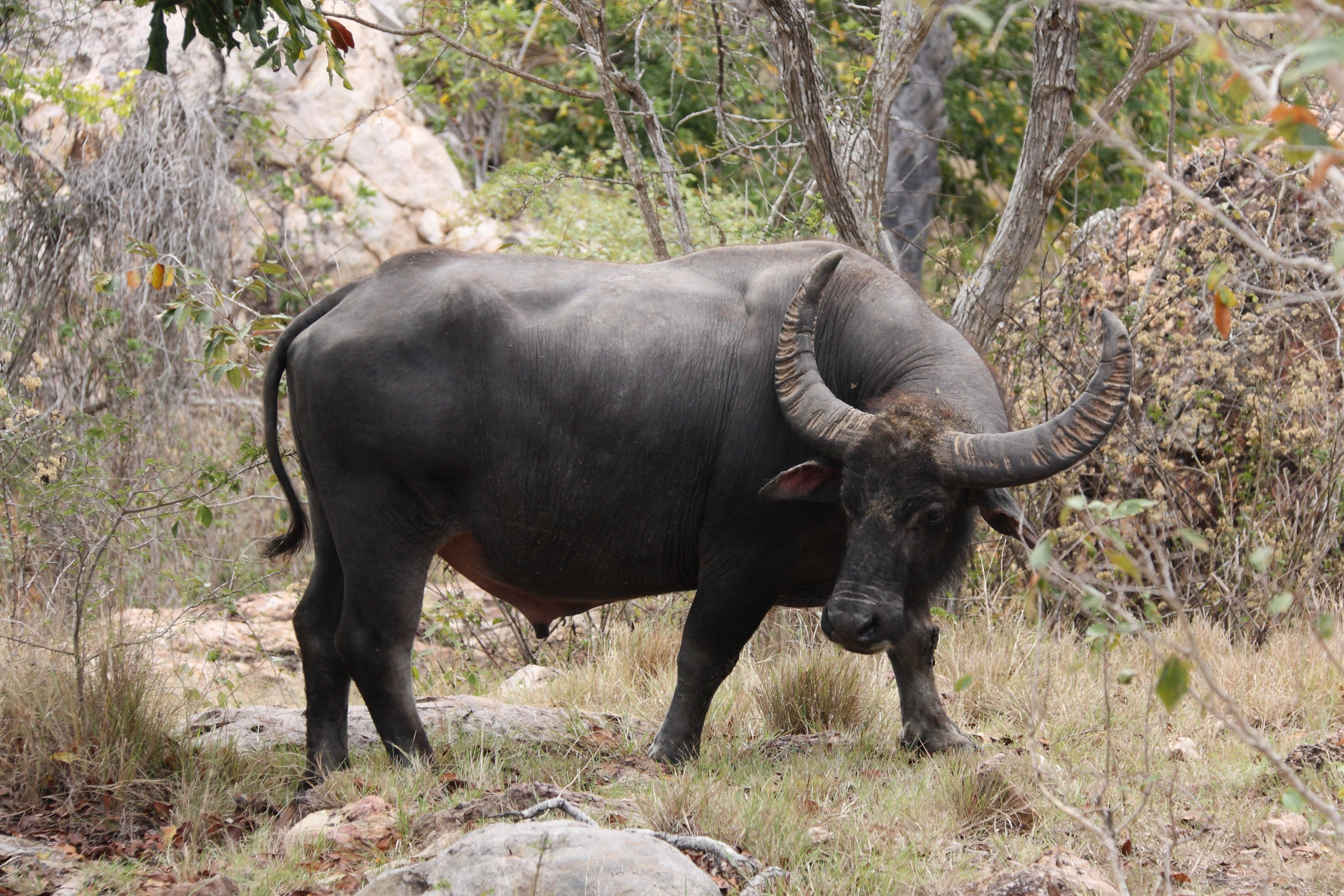
Water buffalo at Rinca

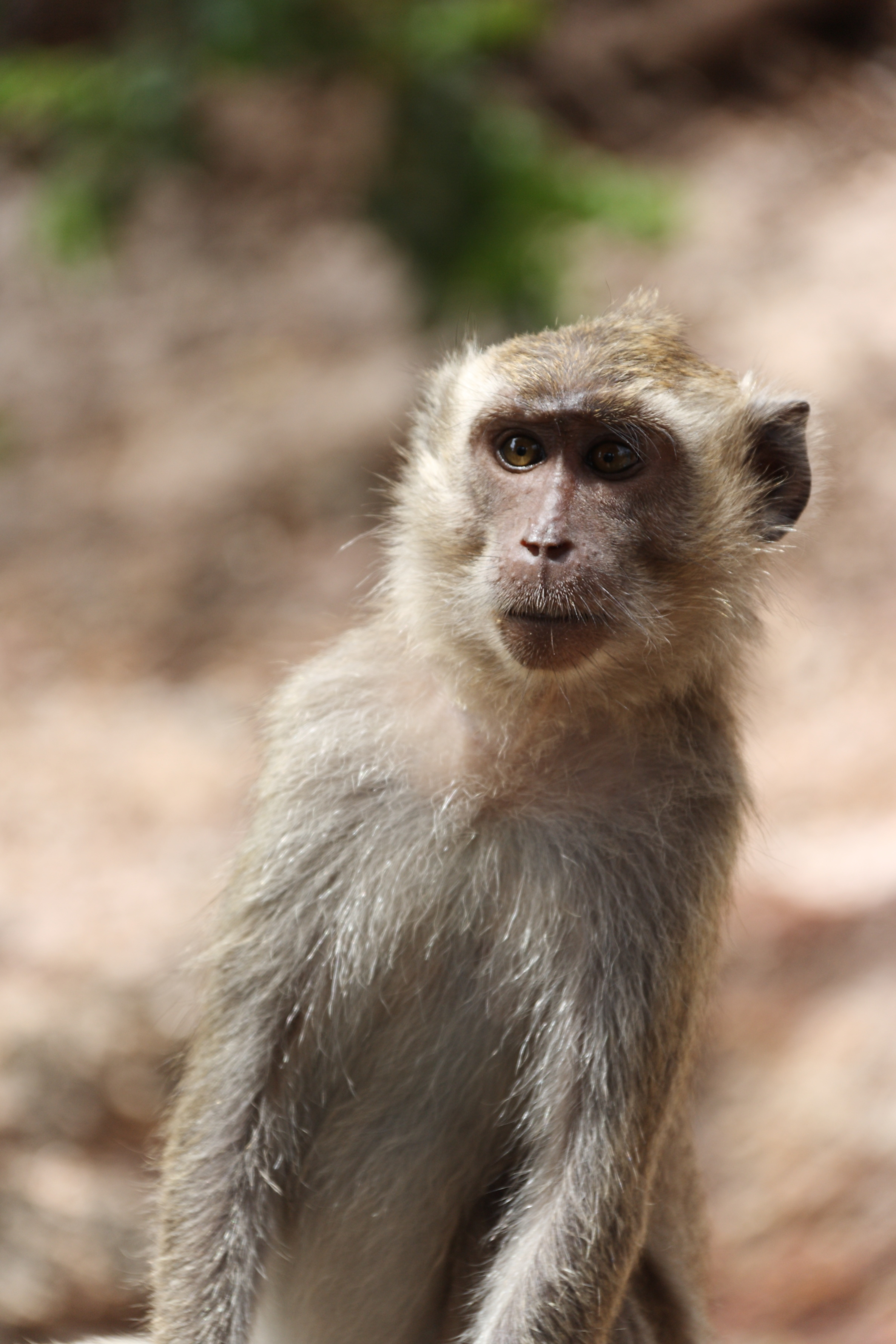
Crab-eating macaque

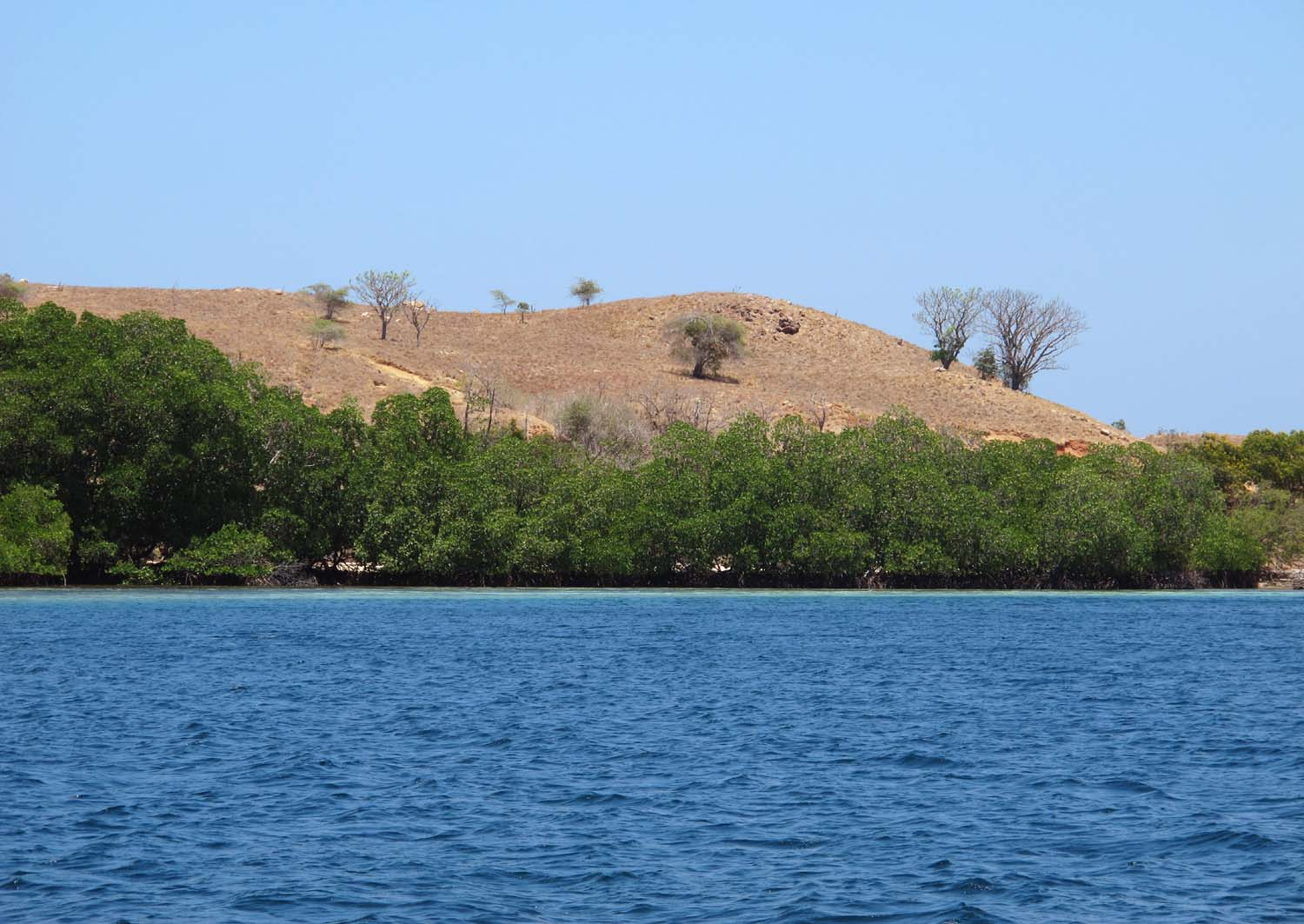
Rinca shore

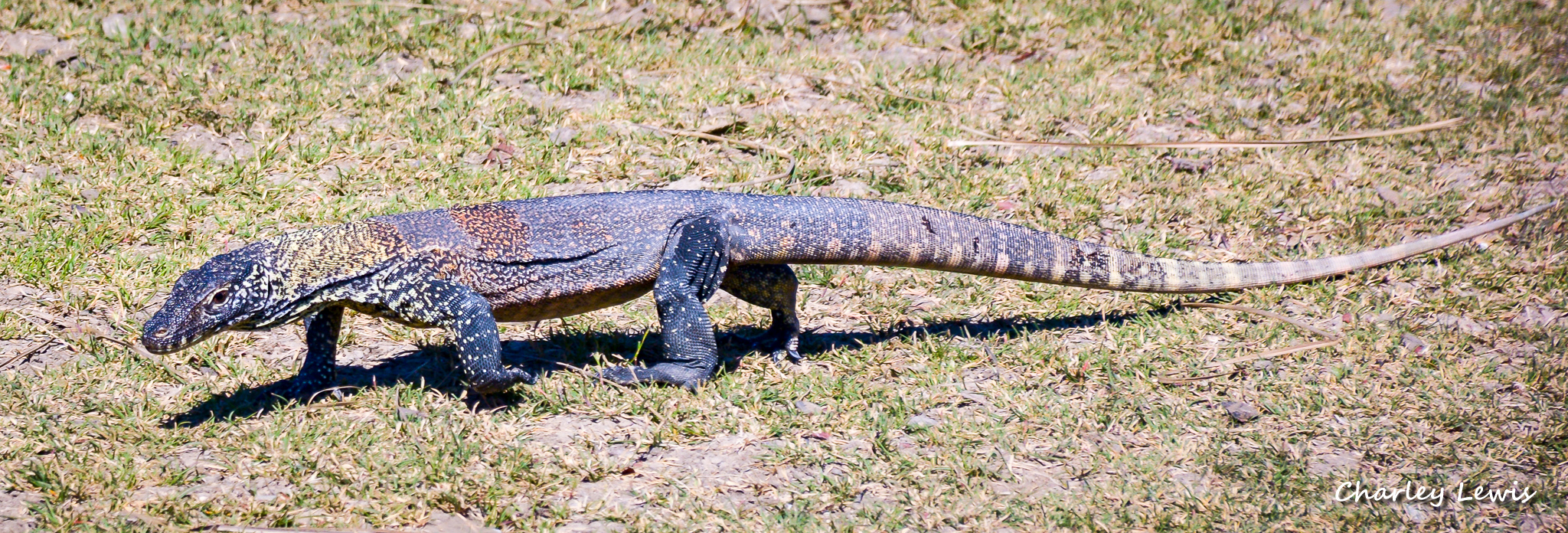
Juvenile Komodo Dragon, Rinca Island
