= Komodo (island) =

Island in East Nusa Tenggara, Indonesia

Komodo Komodo: Tana Modo Indonesian: Pulau Komodo
- Northeastern tip of the island

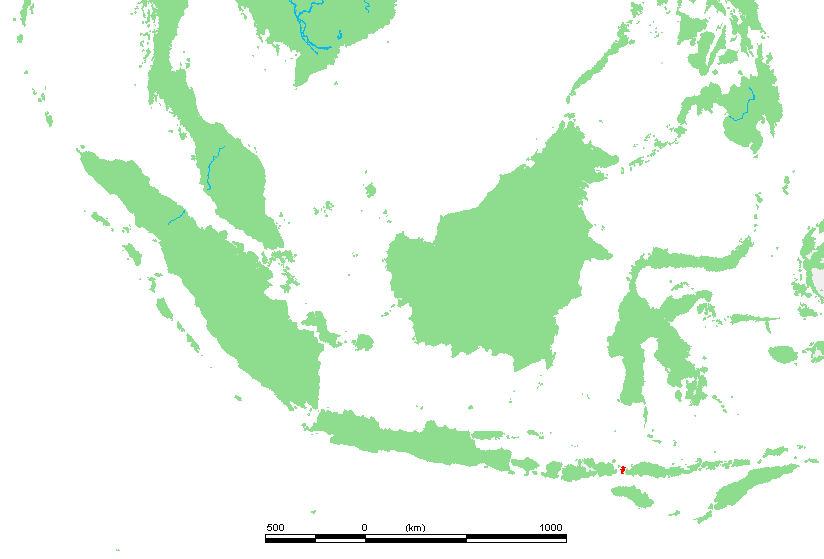

Geography
- Location: Southeast Asia
- Coordinates: 8.55°S 119.45°E
- Archipelago: Lesser Sunda Islands
- Area: 390 km^{2} (150 sq mi)

Administration
- Indonesia
- Province: East Nusa Tenggara

Demographics
- Population: c. 2000
- Ethnic groups: Bugis, others; historically, Komodo people

Komodo Island
- Komodo: Tana Modo; Indonesian: Pulau Komodo
- Interactive map of Komodo Island

UNESCO World Heritage Site
- Criteria: Natural: vii, x
- Reference: 609
- Inscription: 1991 (15th Session)

Komodo (Komodo: Tana Modo; Indonesian: Pulau Komodo pronounced [koˈmodo]) is one of the 17,508 islands that comprise the Republic of Indonesia. It is particularly notable as the habitat of the Komodo dragon, the largest lizard on Earth, which is named after the island. Komodo Island has a surface area of 291 square kilometres, and had a human population of about 1,800 in 2020.

Komodo is part of the Lesser Sunda chain of islands and forms part of the Komodo National Park. It is a popular destination for diving. Administratively, it is part of the Komodo District (which also includes Rinca Island and numerous other islands off the west coast of Flores, together with part of the western portion of Flores itself), forming part of West Manggarai Regency within the province of East Nusa Tenggara.

In 1991 it was included in the Komodo National Park and was declared a UNESCO World Heritage Site and a Man and Biosphere Reserve. It is considered one of the world's 25 biodiversity hotspots. It has also been selected as one of the New 7 Wonders of Nature. The waters surrounding Komodo Island contain rich marine biodiversity. Komodo Island is also a part of the Coral Triangle, which contains some of the richest marine biodiversity on Earth.

It is also a WWF Global 200 Marine Eco-region, a WWF/IUCN Centre of Plant Diversity, one of the world’s Endemic Bird Areas and an ASEAN Heritage Park.

== Description ==
Komodo is part of the Lesser Sunda chain of islands and forms part of the Komodo National Park. It lies between the substantially larger neighbouring islands Sumbawa to the west and Flores to the east. The island's surface area covers 291 square kilometres. Komodo Island is home to the Komodo Dragon, the largest lizard on earth.

== History ==
The earliest clear references to the island appear to be from European sources published in the late 1700s and early 1800s. Maritime charts from English, French and Portguese sources show the name as Comodo Island.

Accounts of large reptilian or dragon-like creatures on the island began to cicrculate among Westerners by the very early 1900s, particularly Dutch sailors based in Flores in East Nusa Tenggara. The creature was described in one local language as buaja darat ("land crocodile") which inhabited a small island in the Lesser Sunda Islands (the main island of which is Flores).

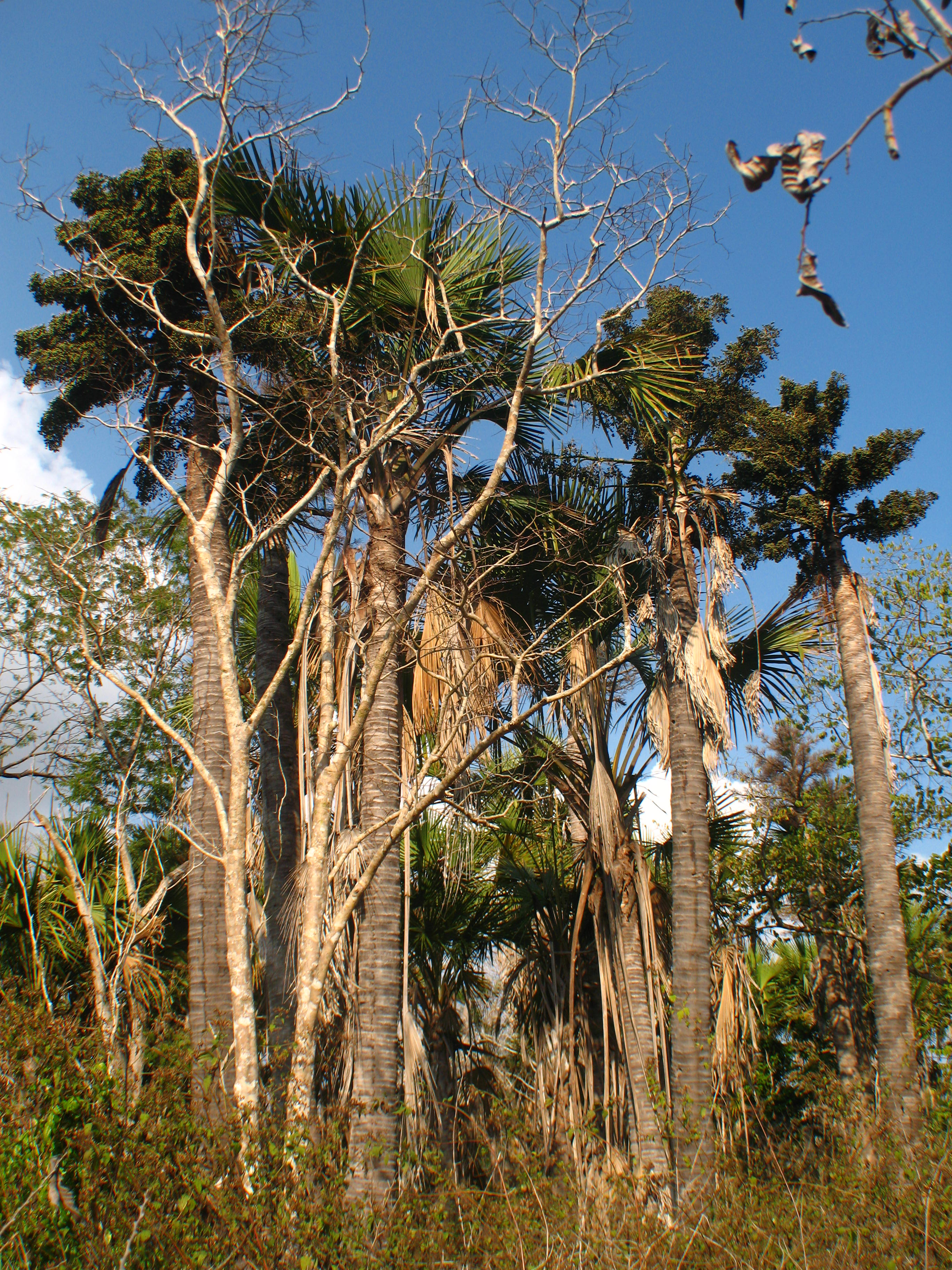
Vegetation on Komodo Island

Hearing the reports, Lieutenant Steyn van Hensbroek, an official of the Dutch Colonial Administration in Flores, planned a trip to Komodo Island to continue the search. He armed himself, and accompanied by a team of soldiers, landed on the island. After a few days, Hensbroek managed to kill one of the lizards to investigate.

Realising the significance of the dragons on Komodo Island as an endangered species, the Dutch government issued a regulation on the protection of the lizards on Komodo Island in 1915.

In the decades since the Komodo became known to non-locals, various scientific expeditions from a range of countries have carried out field research on the dragons on Komodo Island.

== People ==
Komodo had a population of about 1,800 at the 2020 census, spread out over the island and in the main Komodo village. Some earlier sources reported the Komodo people were extinct by about 1980, though more recents scholarship believes there are thousands of people alive today who have some ancestry from the indigenous Komodo though their culture has been somewhat assimilated and their language is endangered.

The island's present-day residents also include descendants of former convicts who were exiled to Komodo and who have mixed with Bugis from Sulawesi. The population is primarily adherents of Islam but there are also Christian and Hindu congregations.

== Ecology ==
Komodo is part of the Lesser Sundas deciduous forests ecoregion. The island is also a popular destination for diving and it has been included into the controversial New 7 Wonders of Nature list since November 11, 2011.

=== Fauna ===
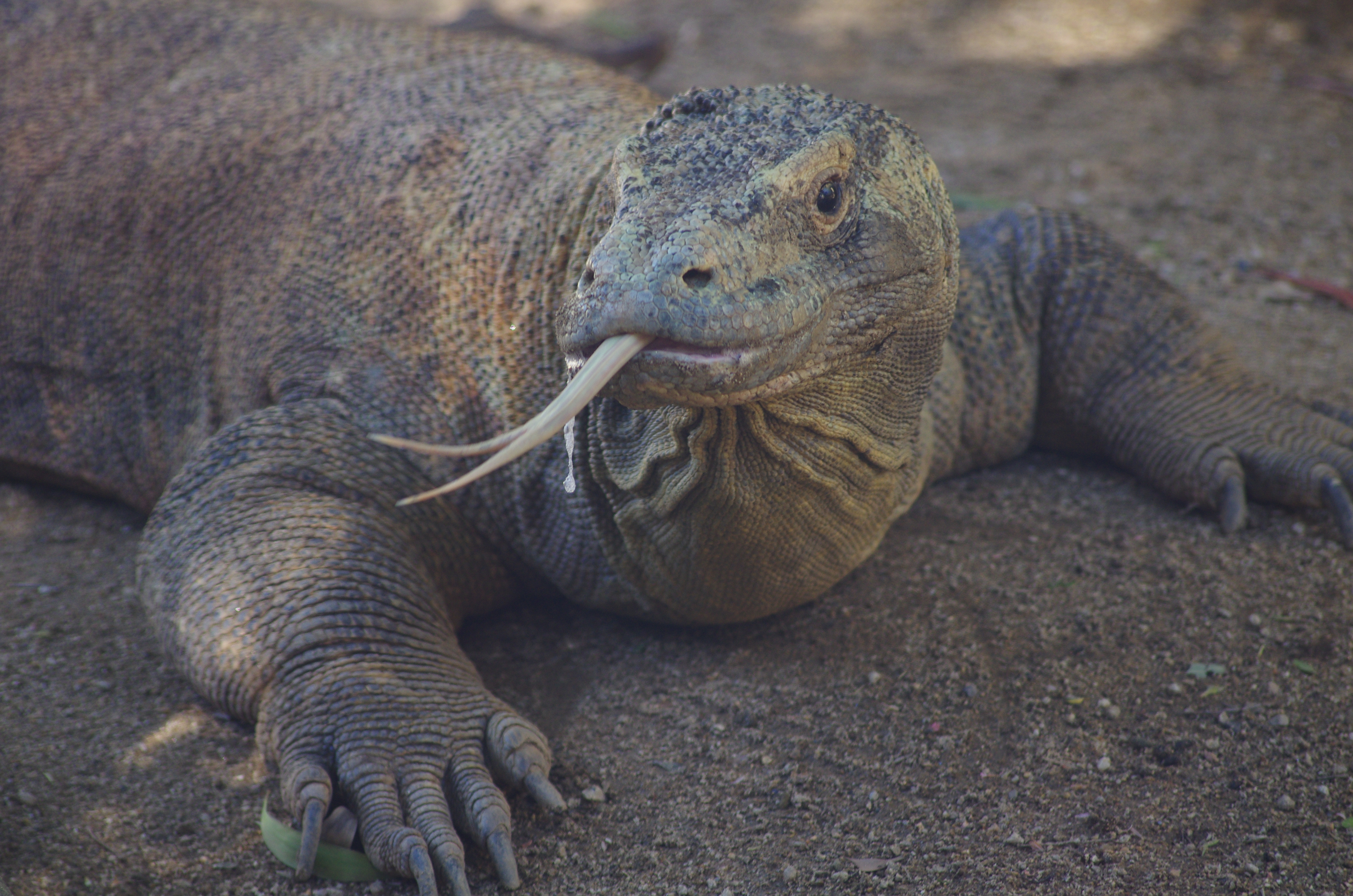
Komodo dragon

The Komodo dragon, the world's largest living lizard, takes its name from the island. A type of monitor lizard, it inhabits Komodo Island and some of the smaller surrounding islands, as well as part of western Flores. Javan deer also inhabit the island, though they are not native. Other animals include water buffalo, banded pigs, civets, cockatoos and macaques.

=== 2020 closure ===
In April 2019, Indonesian authorities announced a plan to close Komodo Island to tourism for a limited period to allow for conservation efforts amid concerns over animal-smuggling. In July 2019, it was confirmed that the island would be closed from the beginning of 2020. In September 2019, the park attracted further controversy when tourists complained that their guides were encouraging them to take selfies with Komodo dragons. The Governor of Nusa Tenggara Timur province, Viktor Laiskodat, said that a budget of Rp 100 billion (around $US 7.2 million) would be provided to support the conservation program. The plan is controversial: Governor Laiskodat has suggested that an expensive entrance fee be charged to foreign tourists while local villagers who live on Komodo Island are worried about the possible loss of income.

== See also ==
- List of islands of Indonesia
