= Tourist attraction =

Place of interest where tourists visit

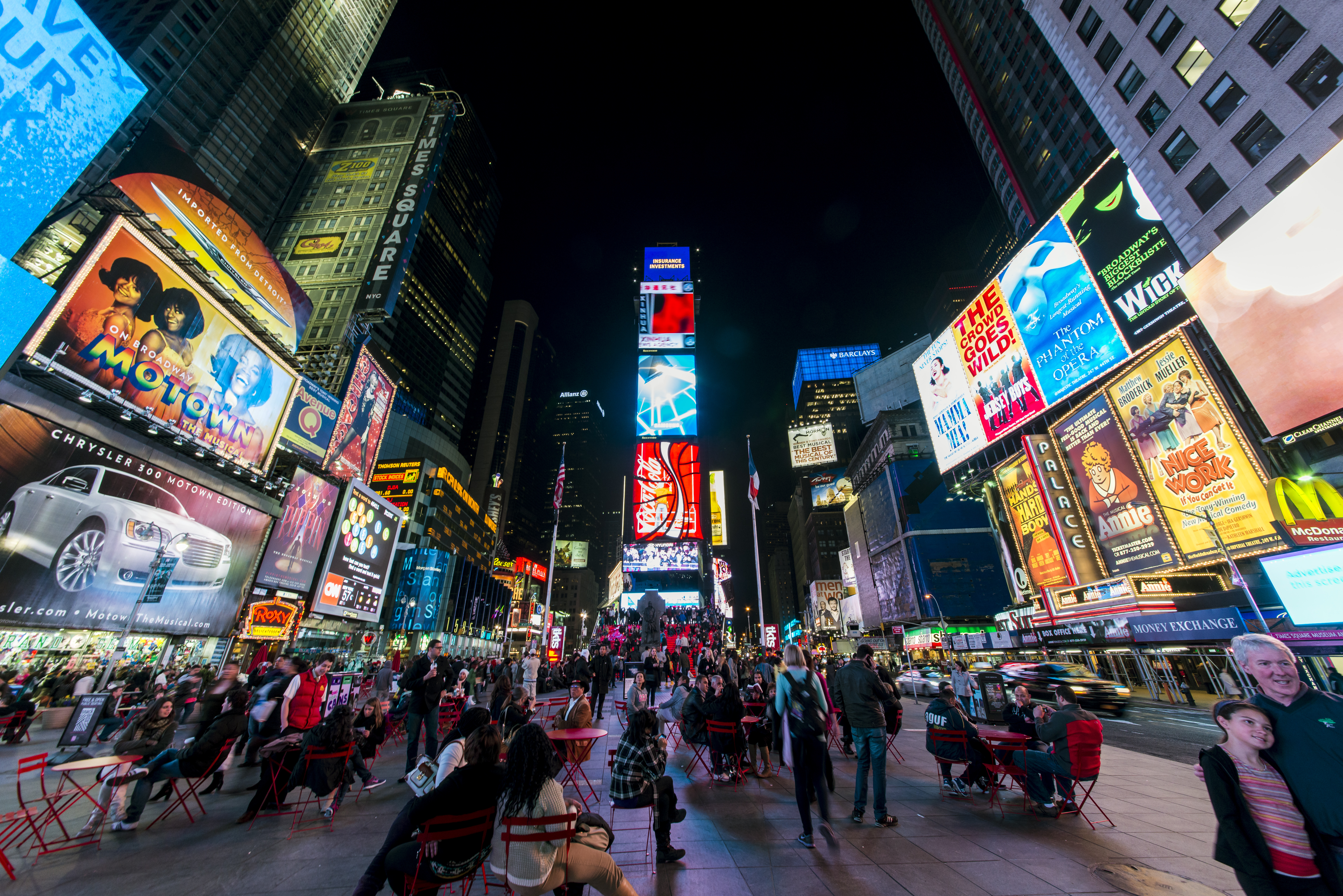
Times Square in Midtown Manhattan, New York City, is the hub of the Broadway theater district and a media center. The intersection has one of the highest annual attendance rates of any tourist attraction in the world, estimated at 50 million.

A tourist attraction is a place of interest that tourists visit, typically for its inherent or exhibited natural or cultural value, historical significance, natural or built beauty, offering leisure and amusement.

== Types ==
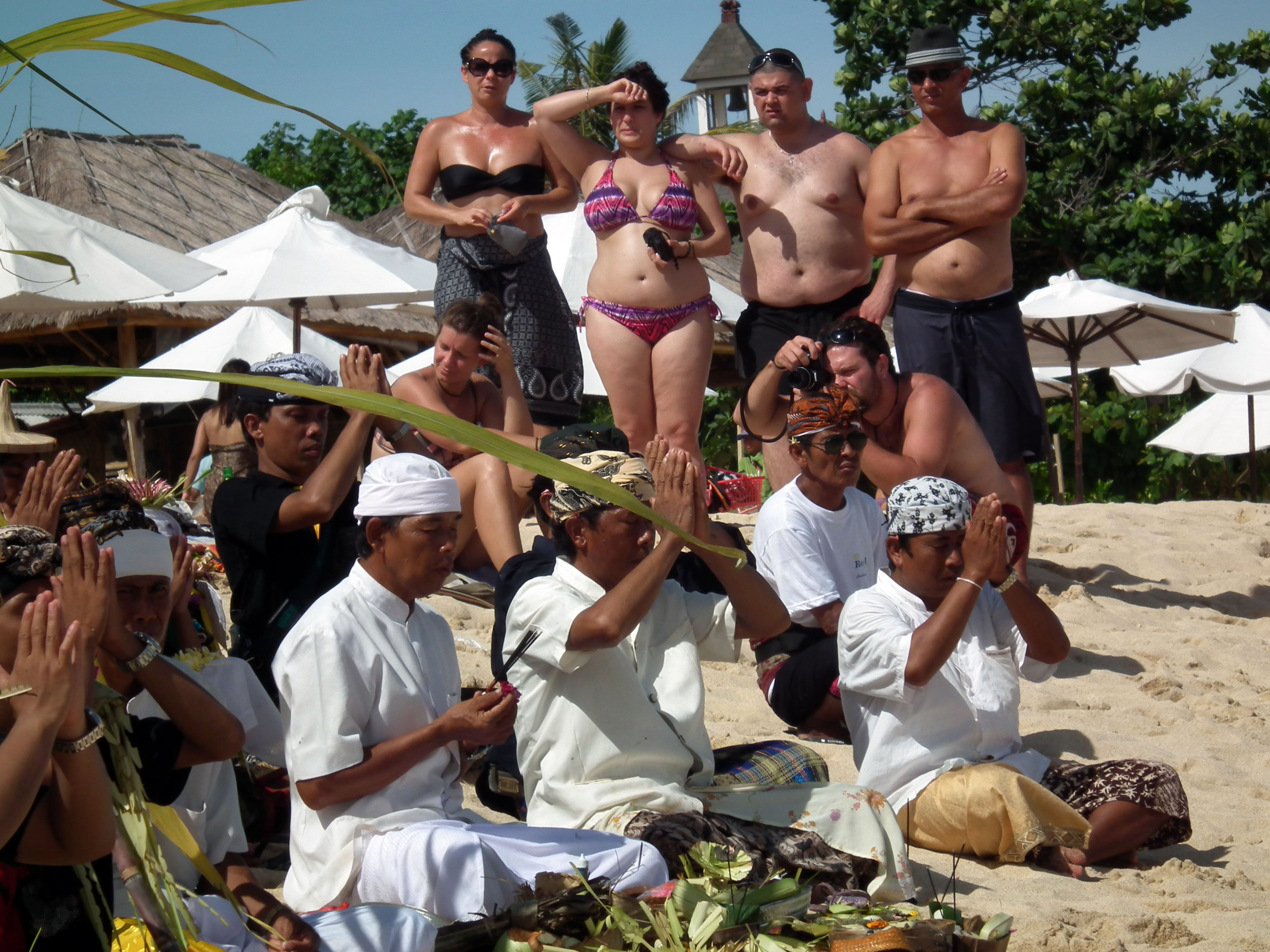
Tropical beaches and Balinese culture are attractions that draw tourists to this popular island resort, such as Melasti rituals performed on the beach.

Places of natural beauty such as beaches, tropical island resorts, national parks, mountains, deserts and forests, are examples of traditional tourist attractions that people may visit. Cultural tourist attractions can include historical places, sites of significant historic events, monuments, ancient temples, zoos, aquaria, museums and art galleries, botanical gardens, buildings and structures (such as forts, castles, libraries, former prisons, skyscrapers, bridges), theme parks and carnivals, living history museums, public art (sculptures, statues, murals), ethnic enclave communities, historic trains and cultural events. Factory tours, industrial heritage, creative art and crafts workshops are the object of cultural niches like industrial tourism and creative tourism. Many tourist attractions are also landmarks. Additionally sports events such as an association football game, Formula 1 race or sailing regatta can also attract tourists.

Tourists’ expectations when visiting a destination are shaped by factors such as its culture, architecture, cuisine, infrastructure, landscape, events, and shopping opportunities. These elements draw visitors in and play a key role in shaping their overall travel experience. The ultimate primary purpose of attractions is to attract the customer's attention so that they can come to a specific location and explore the various attractions on vacation. In the travel and tourism industry, attractions therefore play a particularly important role as this attracts tourists from all over the world.

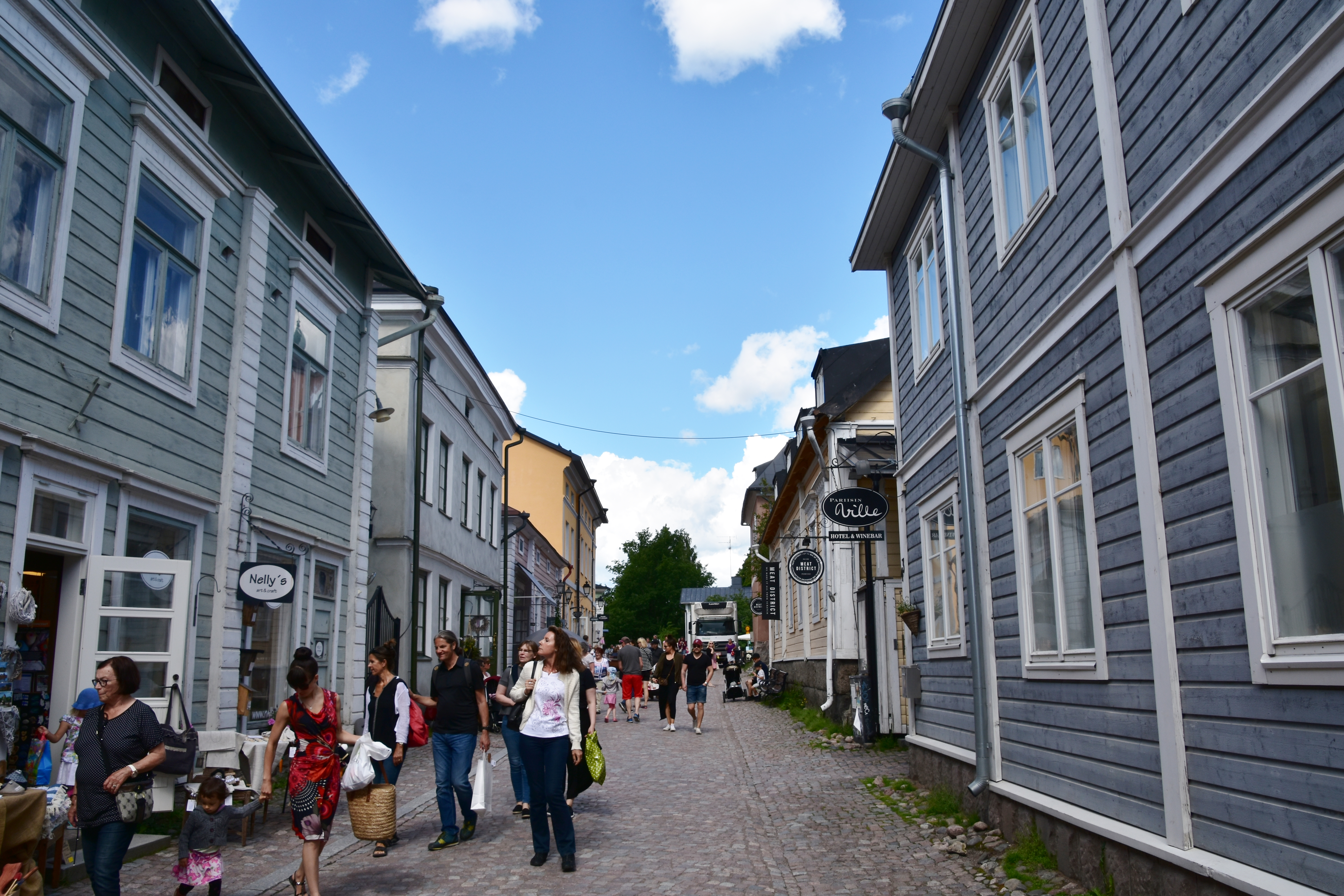
Tourists in the medieval old town of Porvoo

Tourist attractions are also created to capitalize on legends such as a supposed UFO crash site near Roswell, New Mexico and the alleged Loch Ness monster sightings in Scotland. Ethnic communities may become tourist attractions, such as Chinatowns in the United States and the black British neighborhood of Brixton in London, England. Tourists also look for special local culinary experiences such as street kitchens in Asian metropolises or the coffeehouse culture in Central Europe. In particular, cultural property and the individual places of the UNESCO World Heritage Site have developed into tourist attractions. If too many tourists frequent individual places, this can lead to environmental pollution and resistance from the local population, such as in Barcelona or Venice. With regard to this whole subject, there are already lists of destinations that are not recommended to tourists.

There are innumerable lists and reviews of tourist attractions. Visitor statistics, cultural significance, beauty or age are used and these always reflect the author's personal assessments. Sometimes it is particularly emphasized that this particular tourist attraction has not yet been in the focus of the international tourism industry. Some of the sights are internationally known or target the national or local market. Some attractions are reserved for the local population or are rarely advertised because the main traffic routes and main airports are too far away.

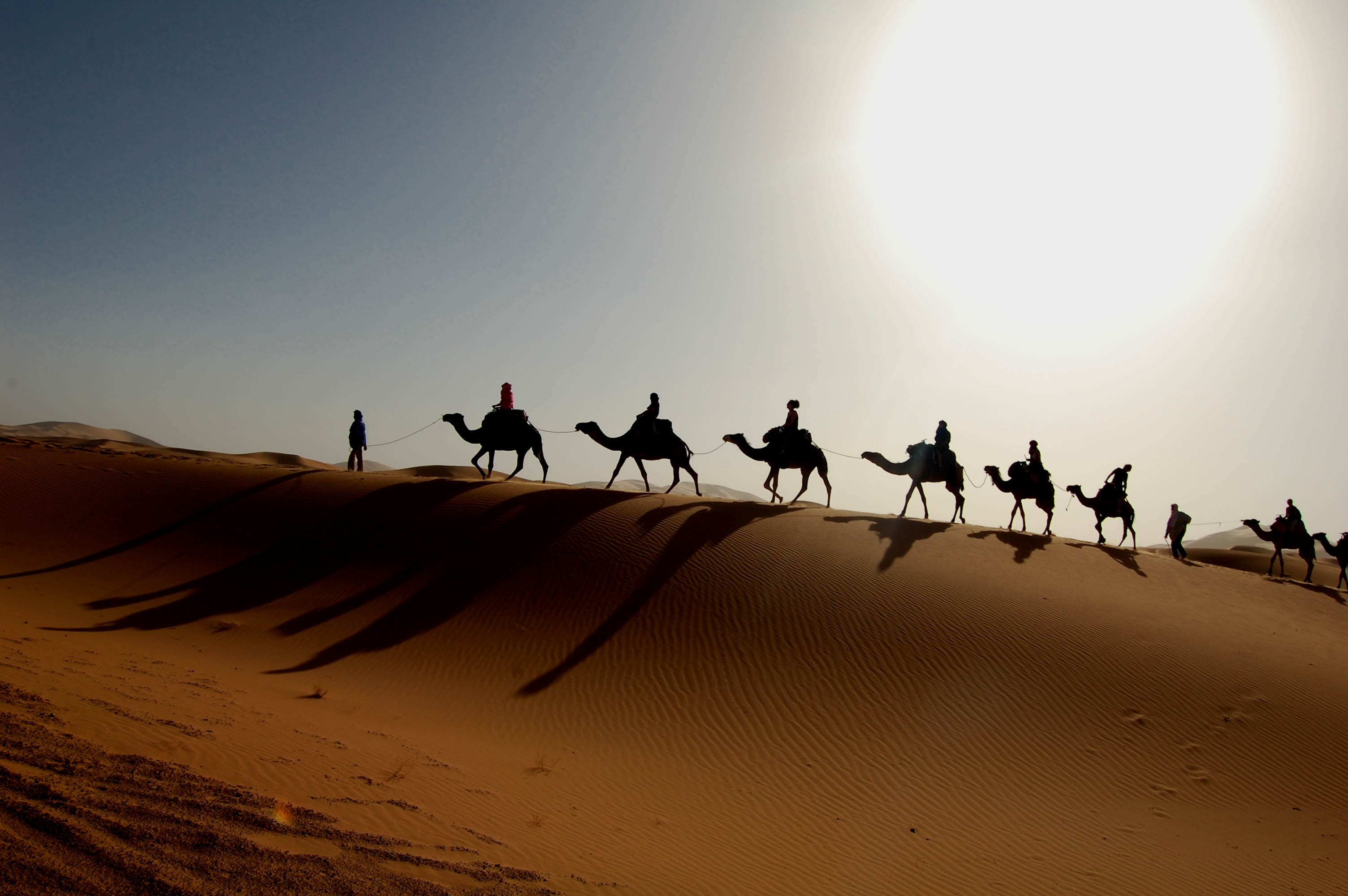
Deserts like the Sahara are also tourist attractions.

In the United States, owners and marketers of attractions advertise tourist attractions on billboards along the sides of highways and roadways, especially in remote areas. Tourist attractions often distribute free promotional brochures to be displayed in rest areas, information centers, fast food restaurants, and motel rooms or lobbies.

While some tourist attractions provide visitors a memorable experience for a reasonable admission charge or even for free, others may be of low quality and overprice their goods and services (such as admission, food, and souvenirs) in order to profit excessively from tourists. Such places are commonly known as tourist traps. Within cities, rides on boats and sightseeing buses are sometimes popular.

== Examples ==
=== Human-made attractions ===
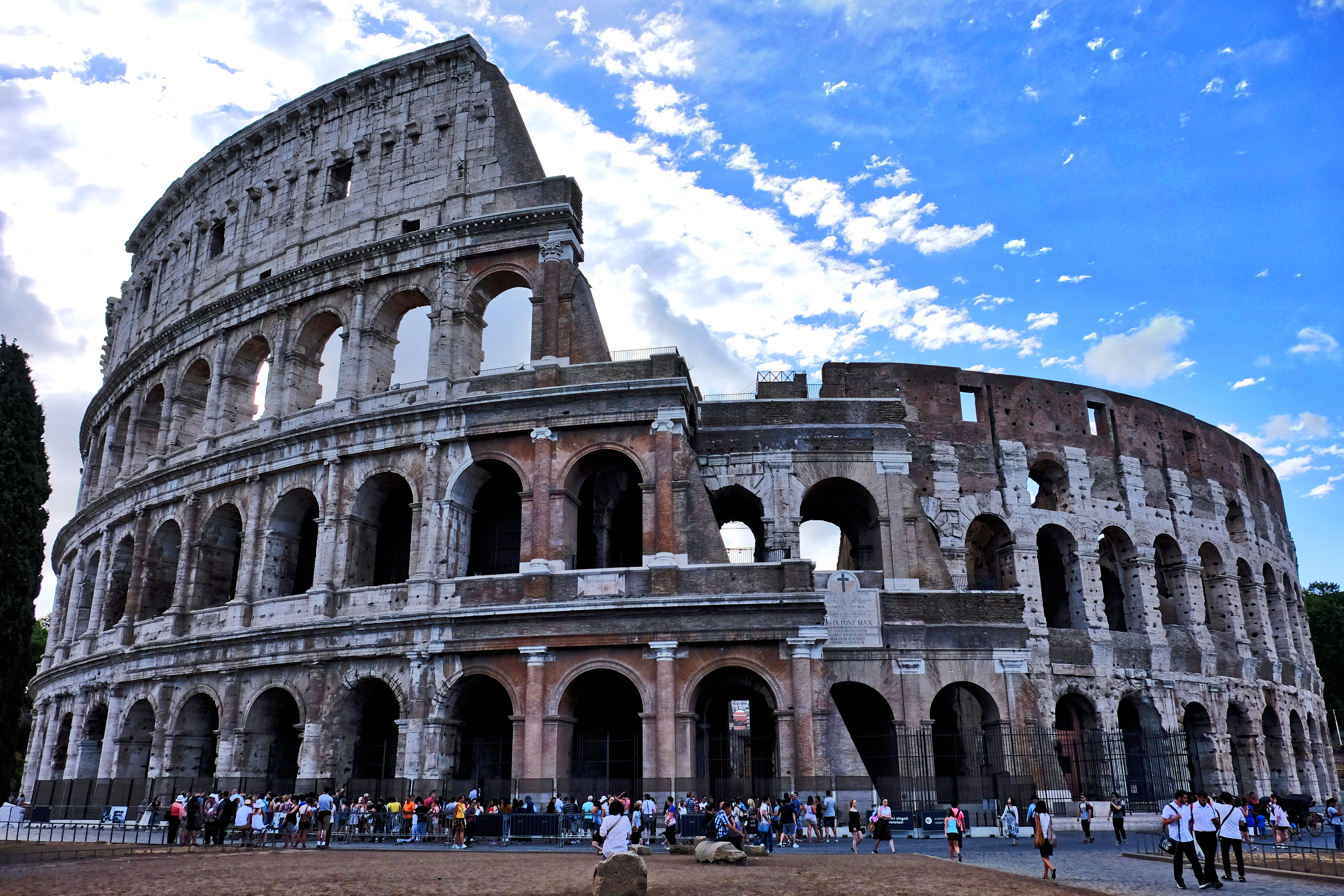
The Colosseum in Rome, Italy, is considered one of the most popular tourist attractions in the world.

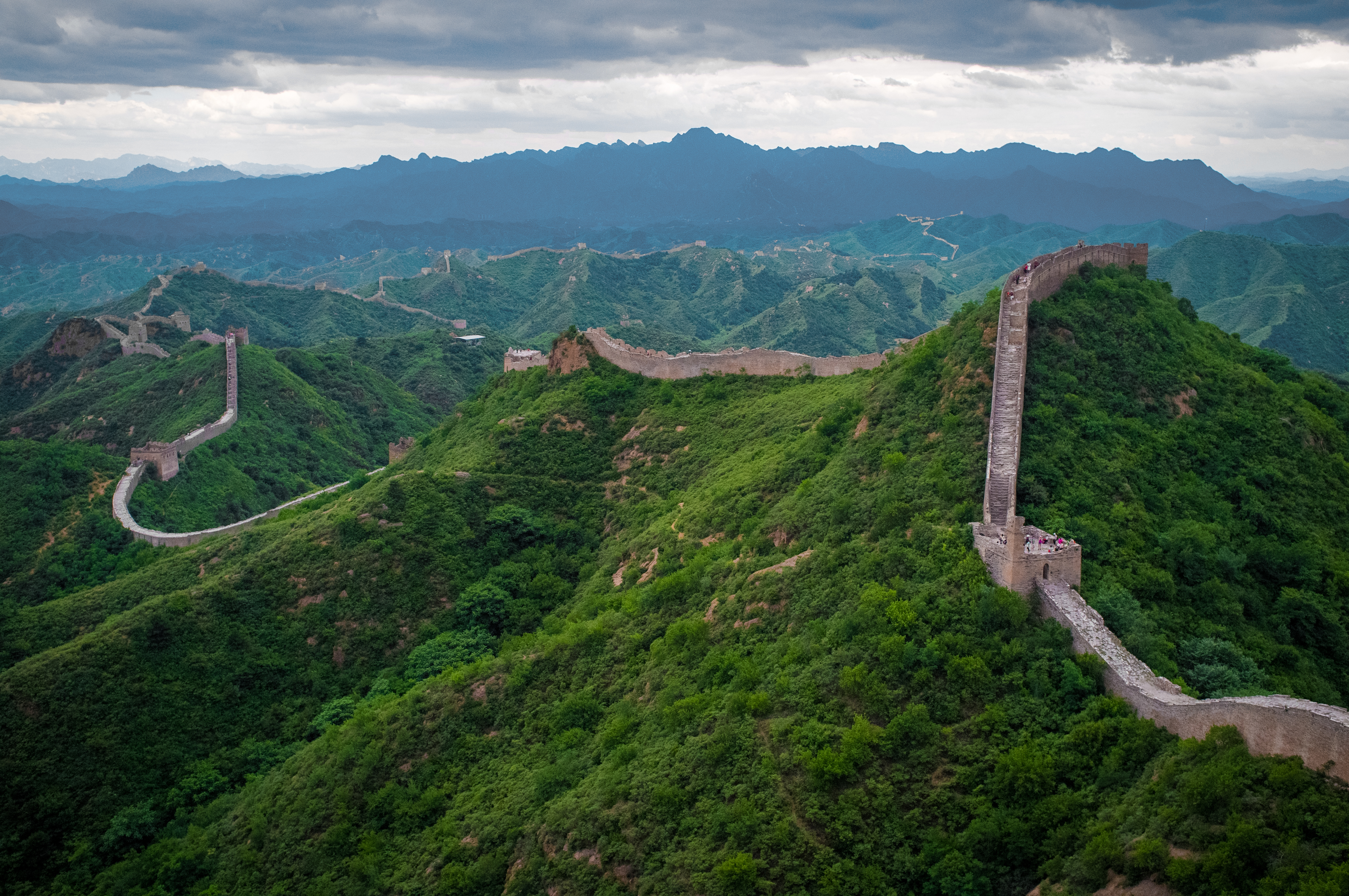
The Great Wall of China, a popular tourist attraction.

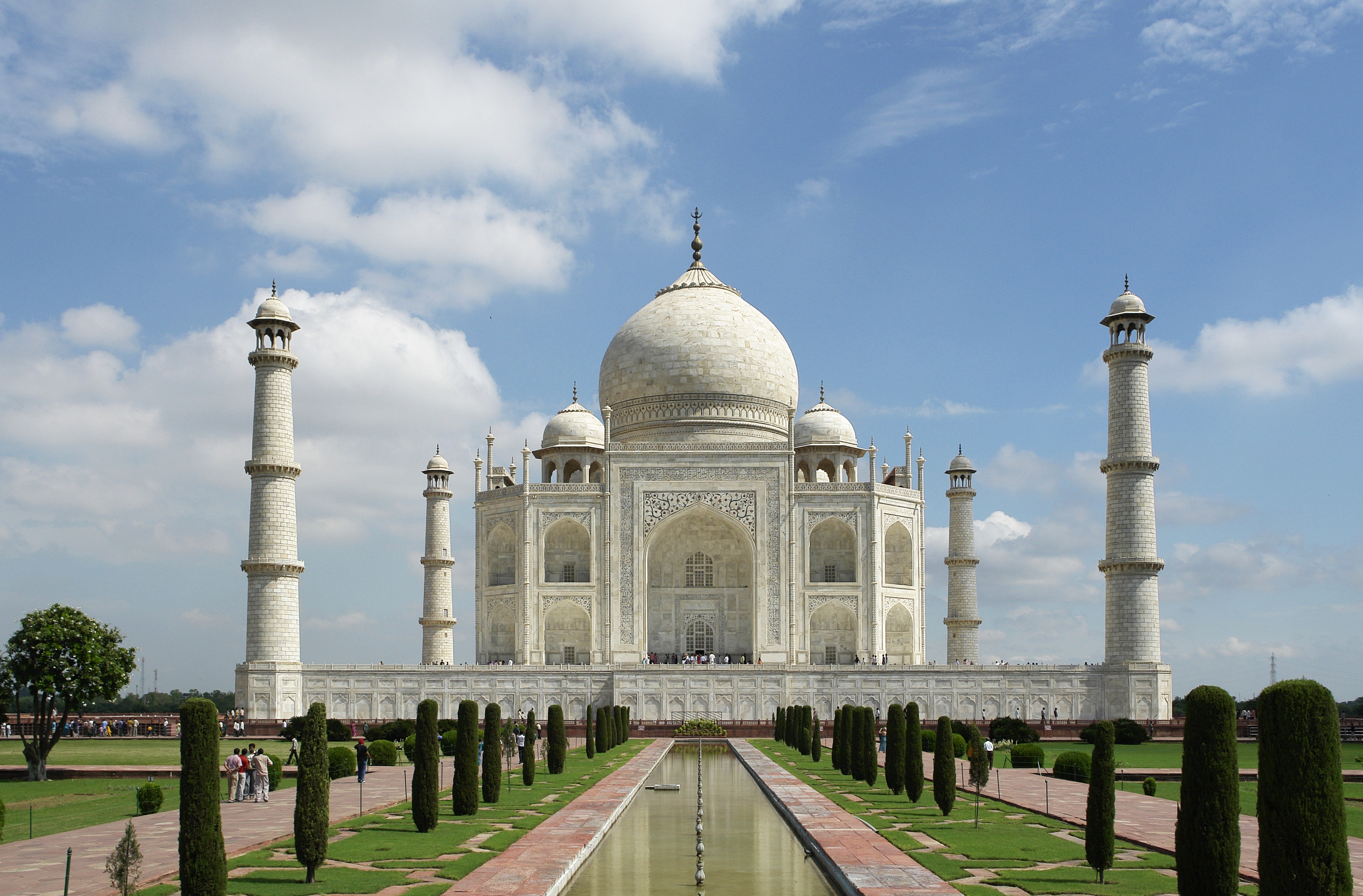
The Taj Mahal in Agra, India, a popular tourist attraction. More than 7–8 million visit the Taj Mahal each year.

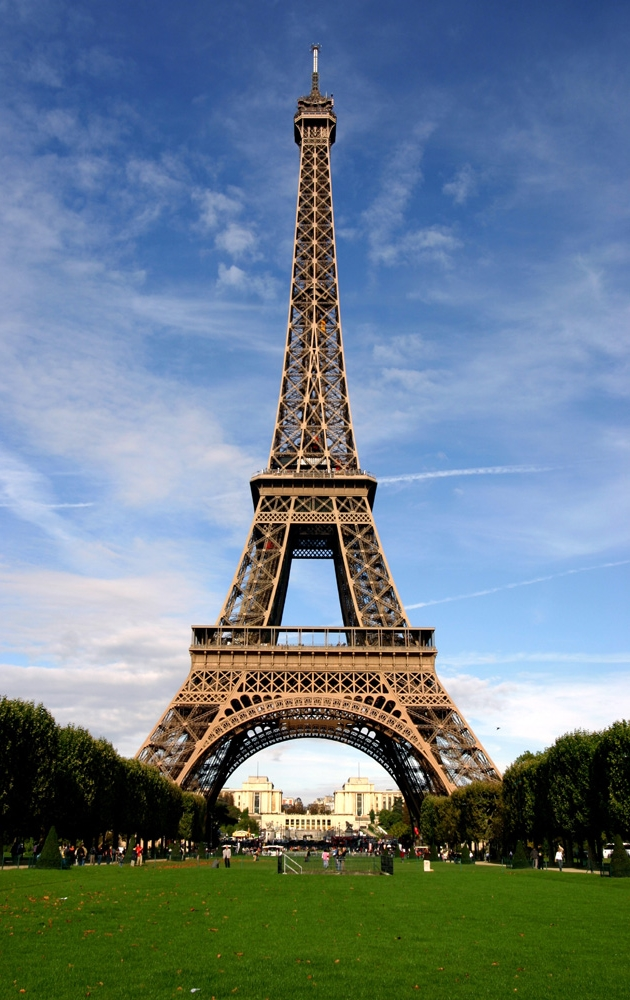
The Eiffel Tower in Paris, France, a popular tourist attraction. Almost 7 million visit the tower each year.

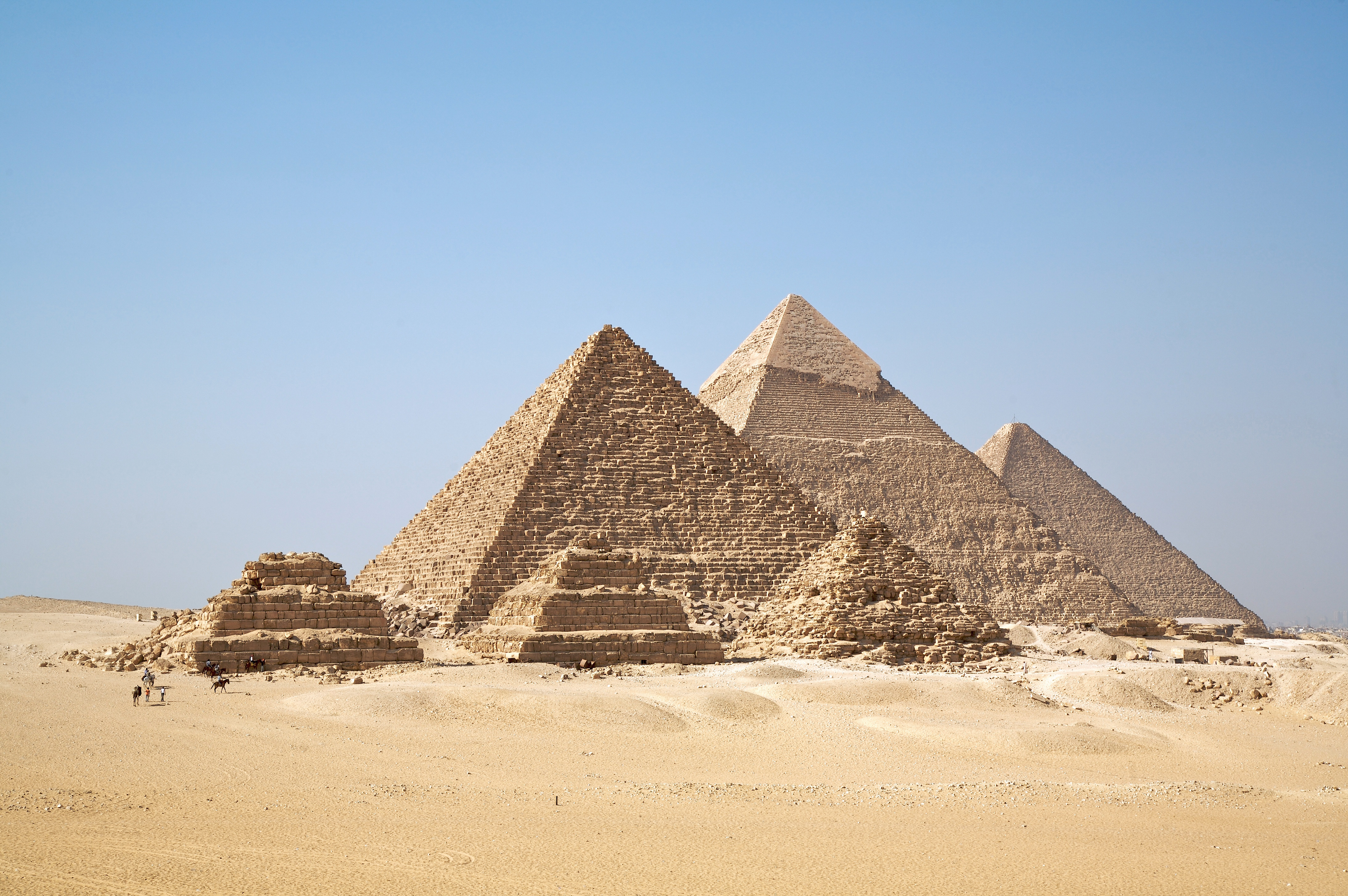
The Egyptian pyramids, a well-known site for visitors since ancient times.

Burj Khalifa, the tallest building in the world.

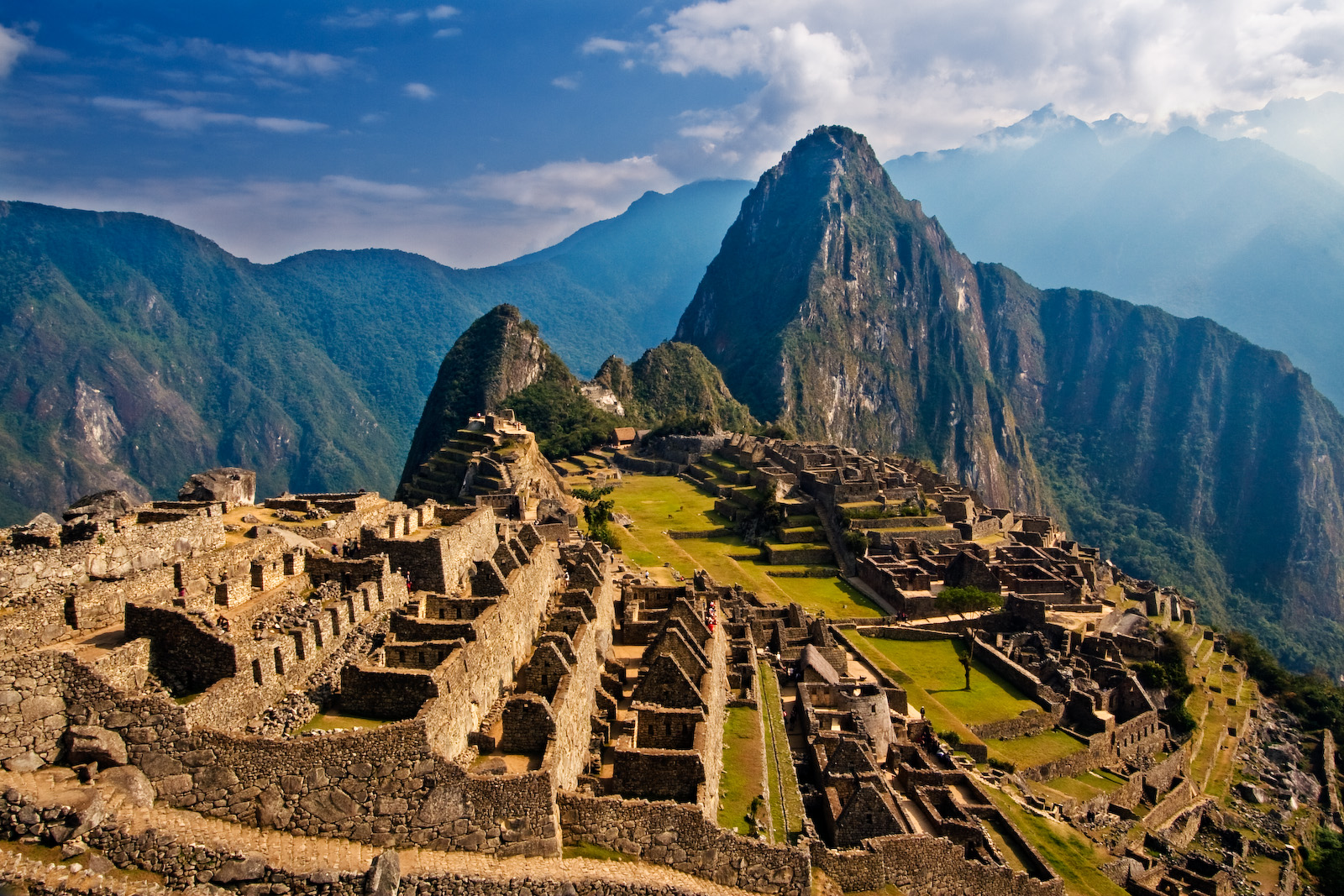
Machu Picchu, Peru, one of the New Seven Wonders of the World.

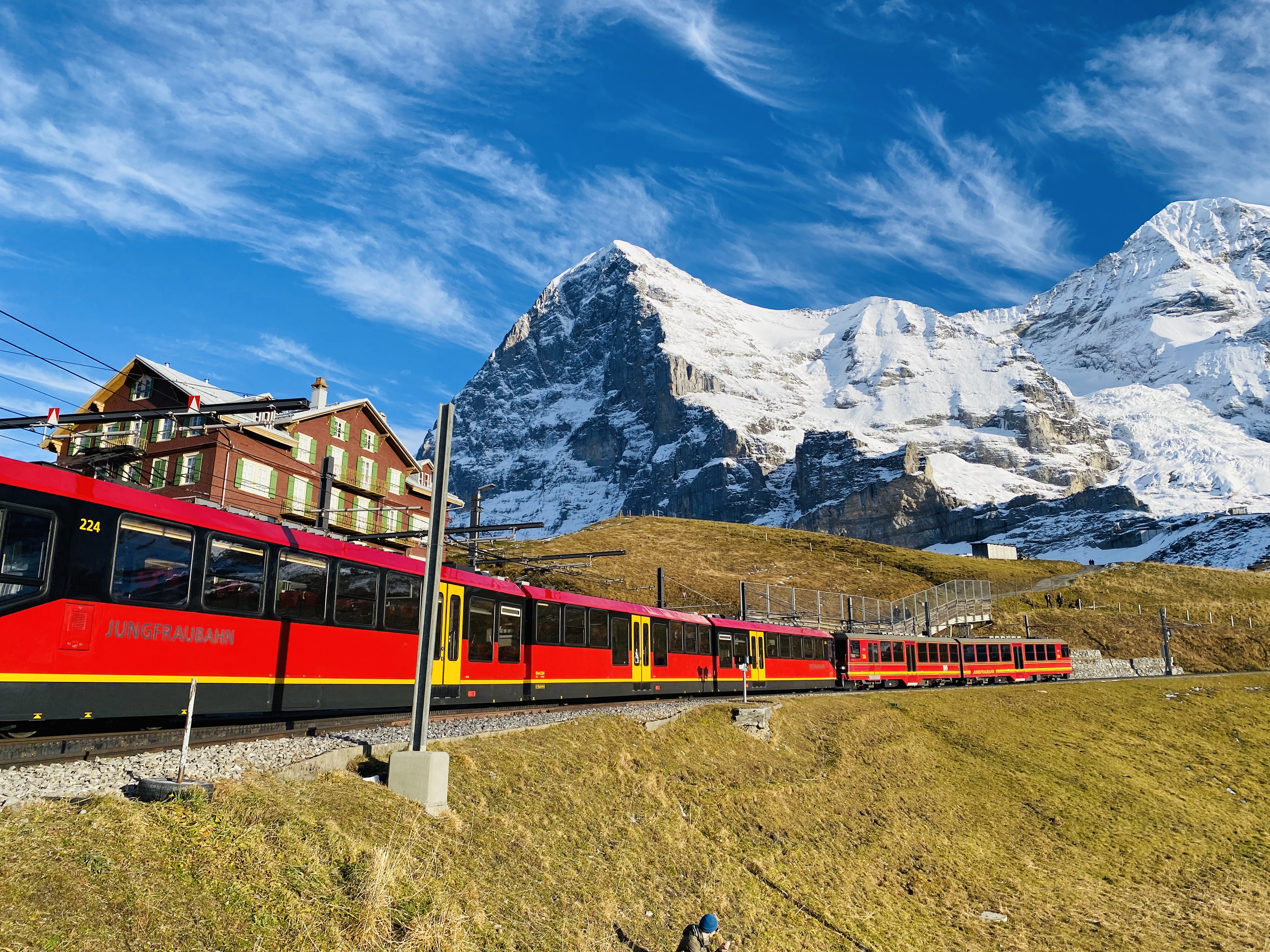
The Jungfrau Railway to Europe's highest railway station at 3,454 m (11,332 ft), visited by 1 million tourists a year.

=== Natural tourist attractions ===
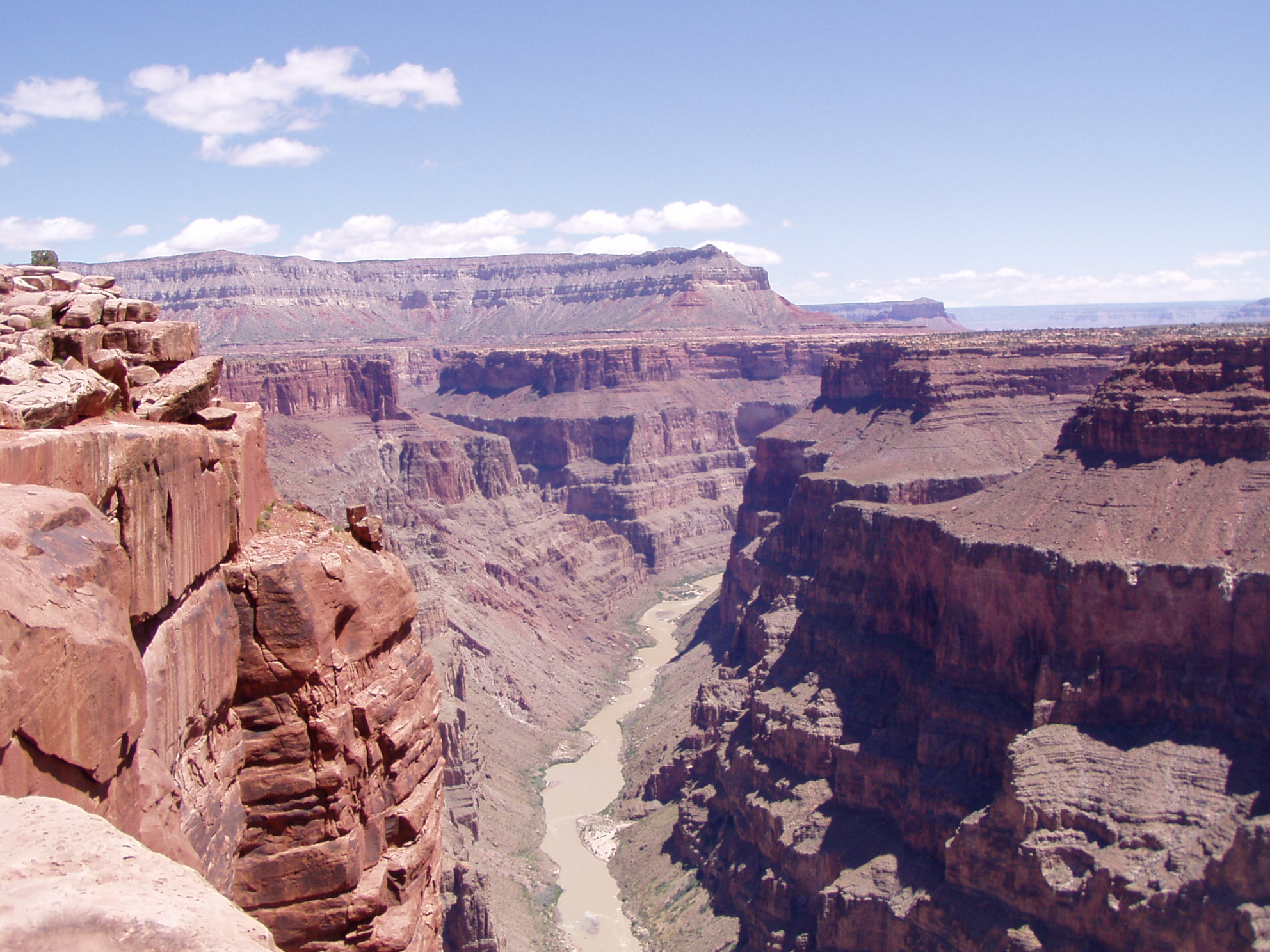
Grand Canyon, Arizona, USA, a natural wonder famous for its deep views.

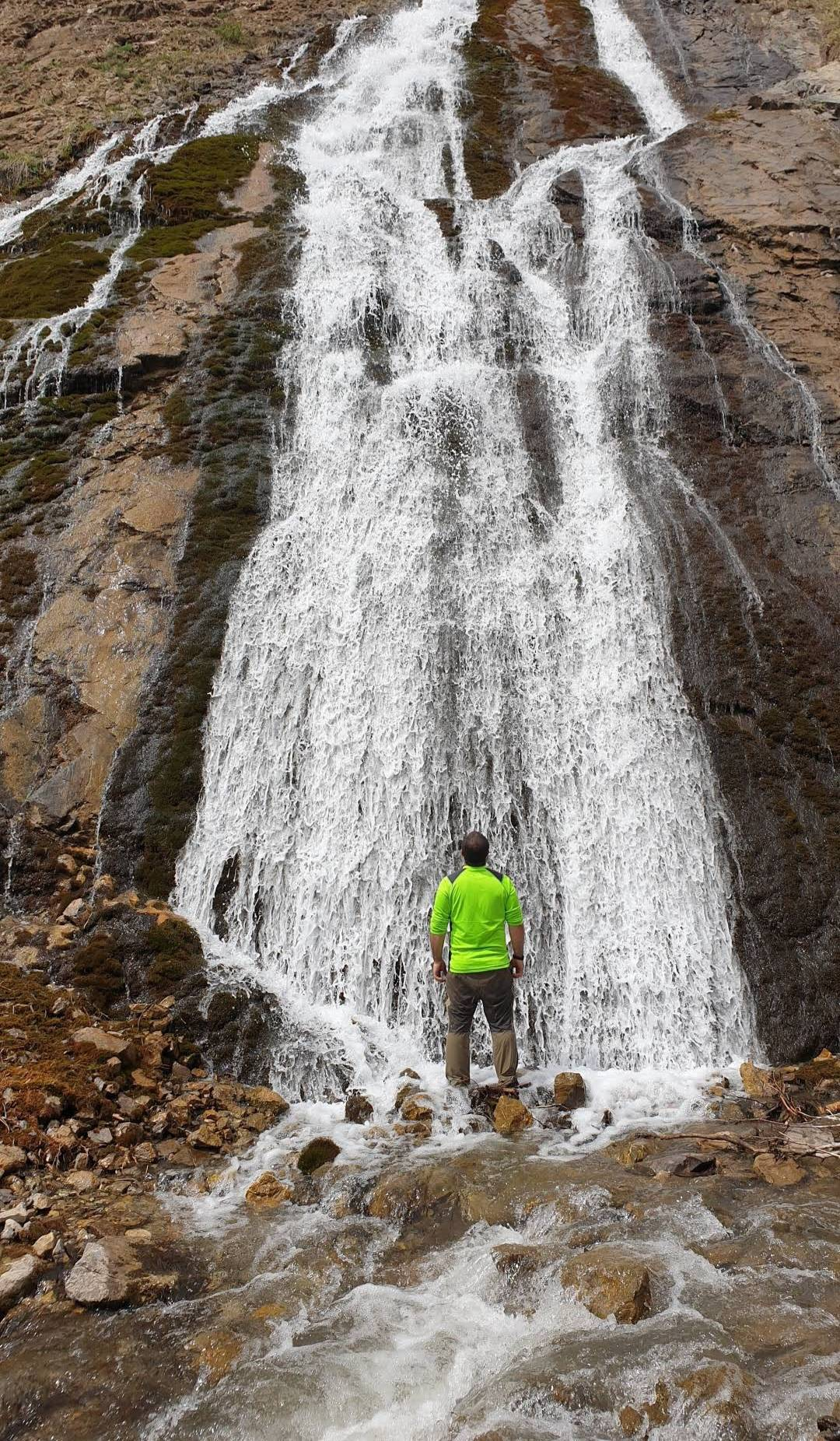
Sibieh Khani waterfall in Lerd tourist village, Ardabil province, Iran is one of the popular tourist destinations in Iran.

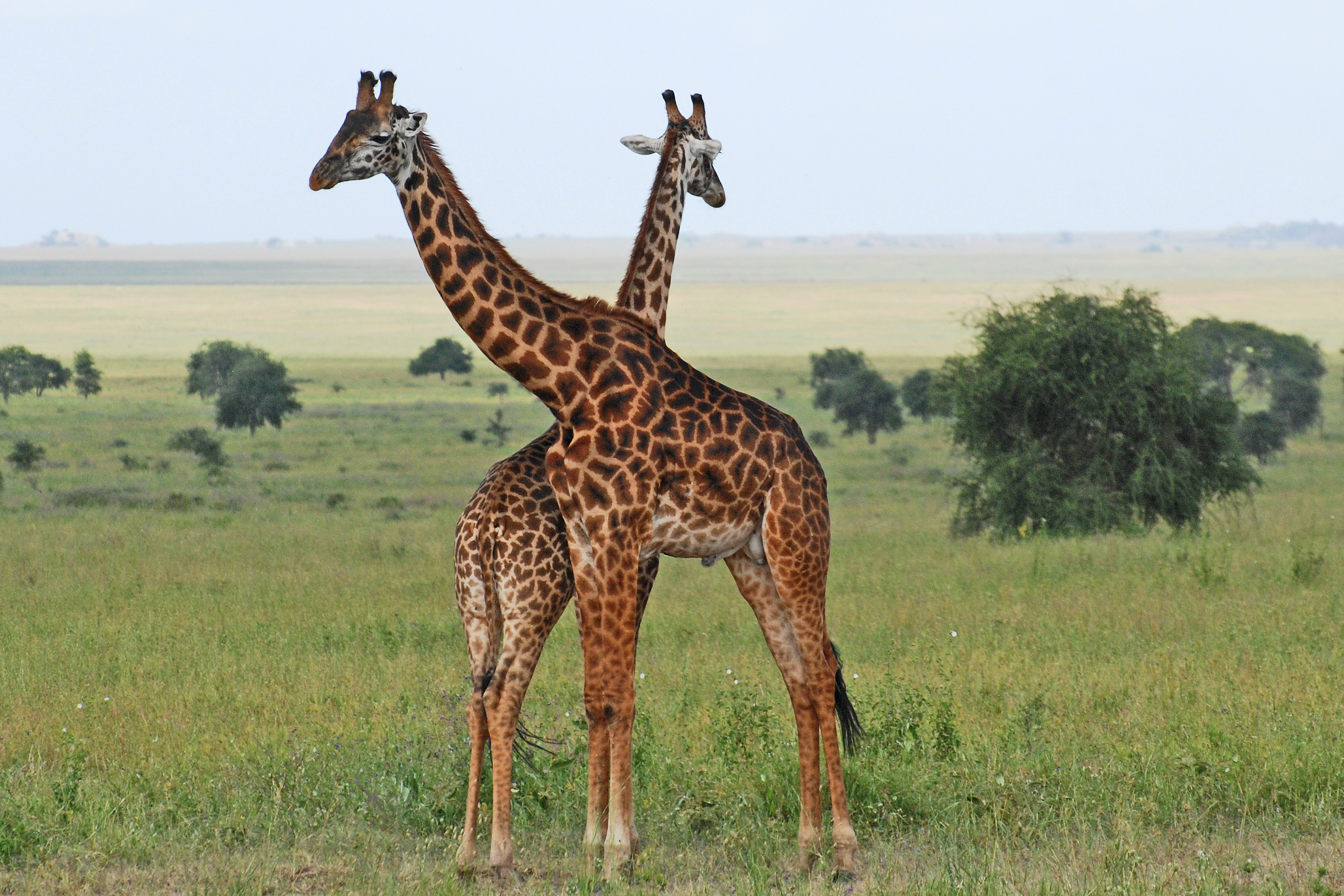
The Serengeti, Africa, is one of the largest and most famous national parks in the world.

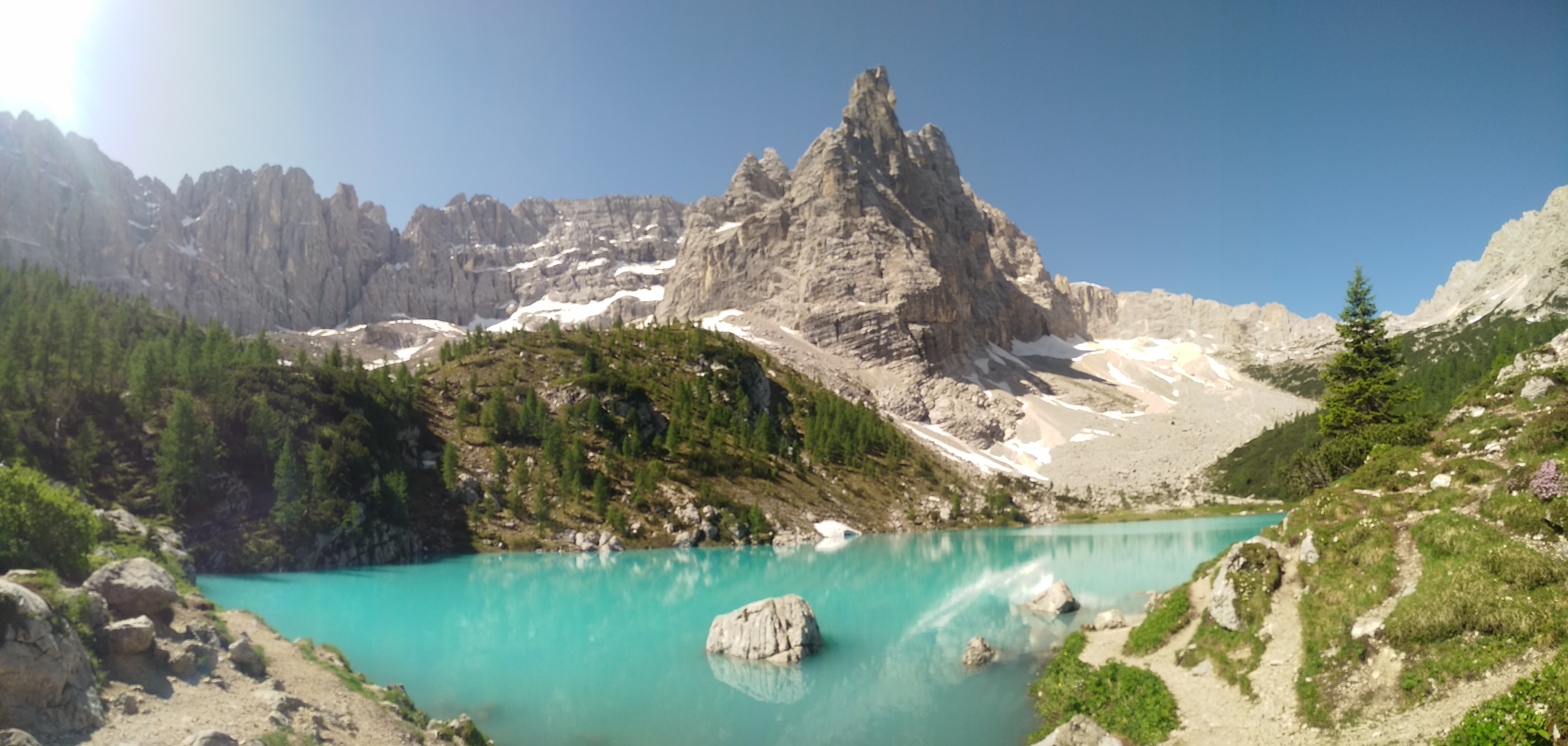
Lake Sorapiss in the Dolomites, Italy - a natural attraction that can only be reached on foot.

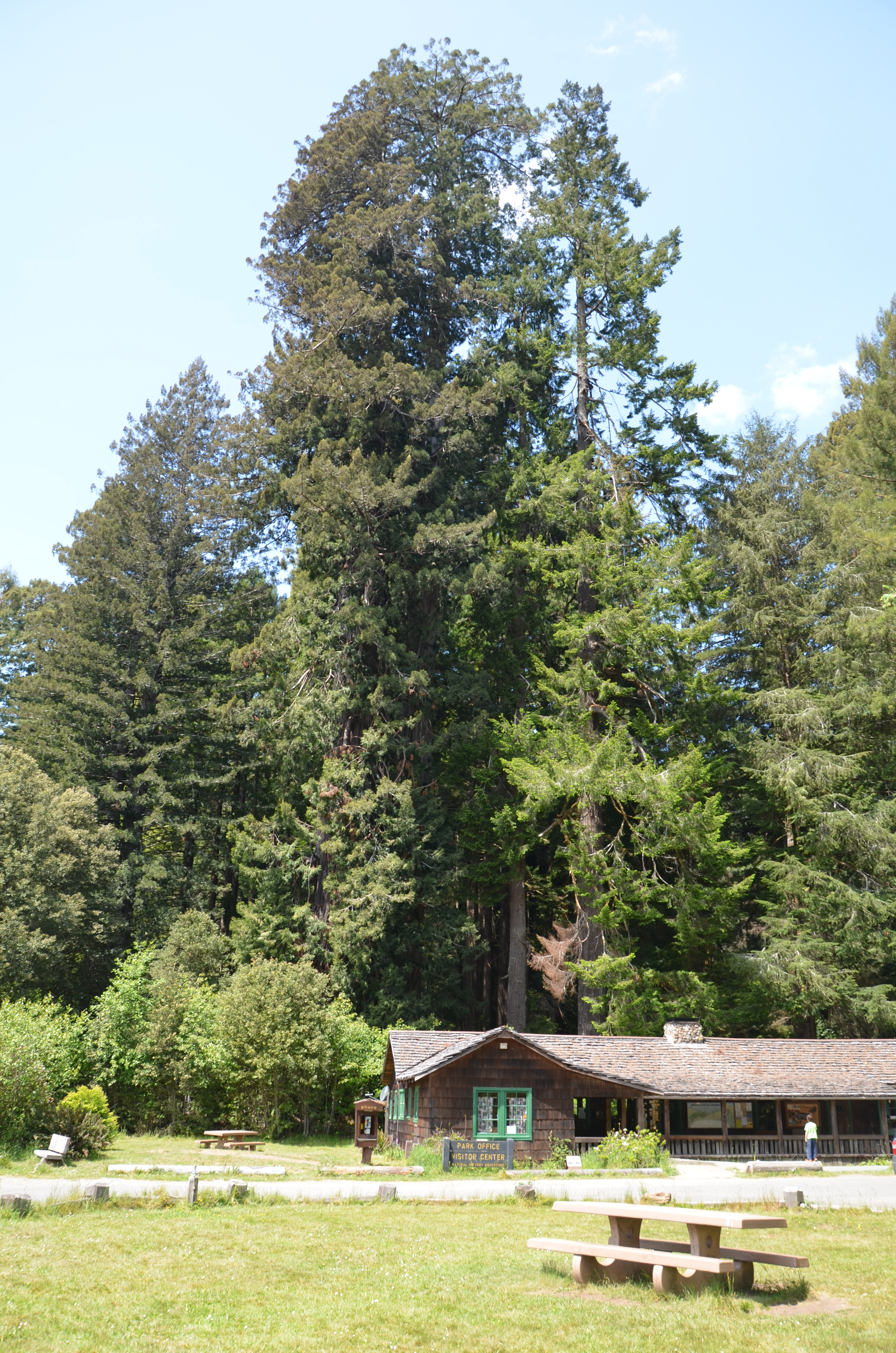
Redwood National and State Parks in California, USA.

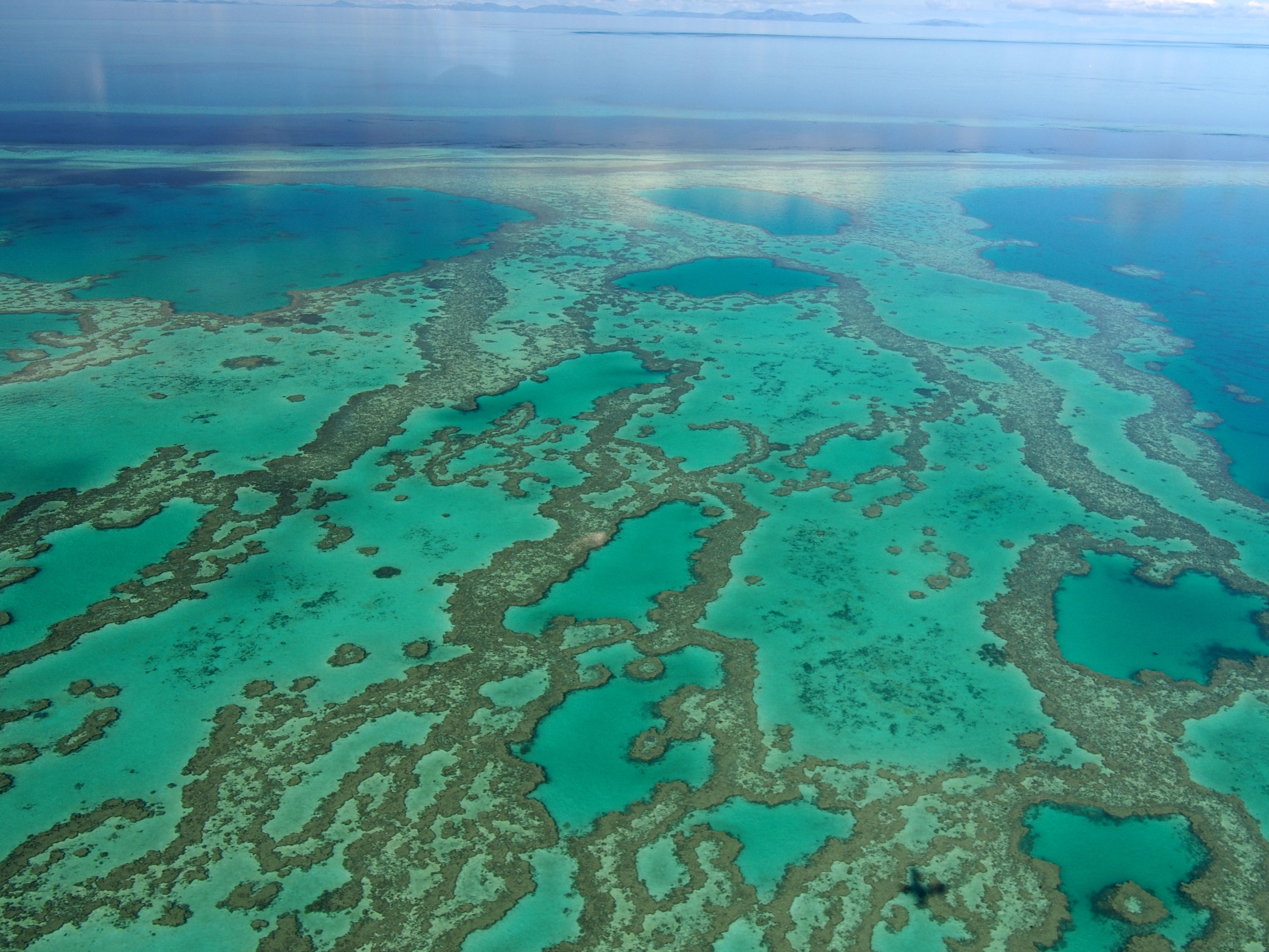
Great Barrier Reef in Australia, an endangered natural wonder.

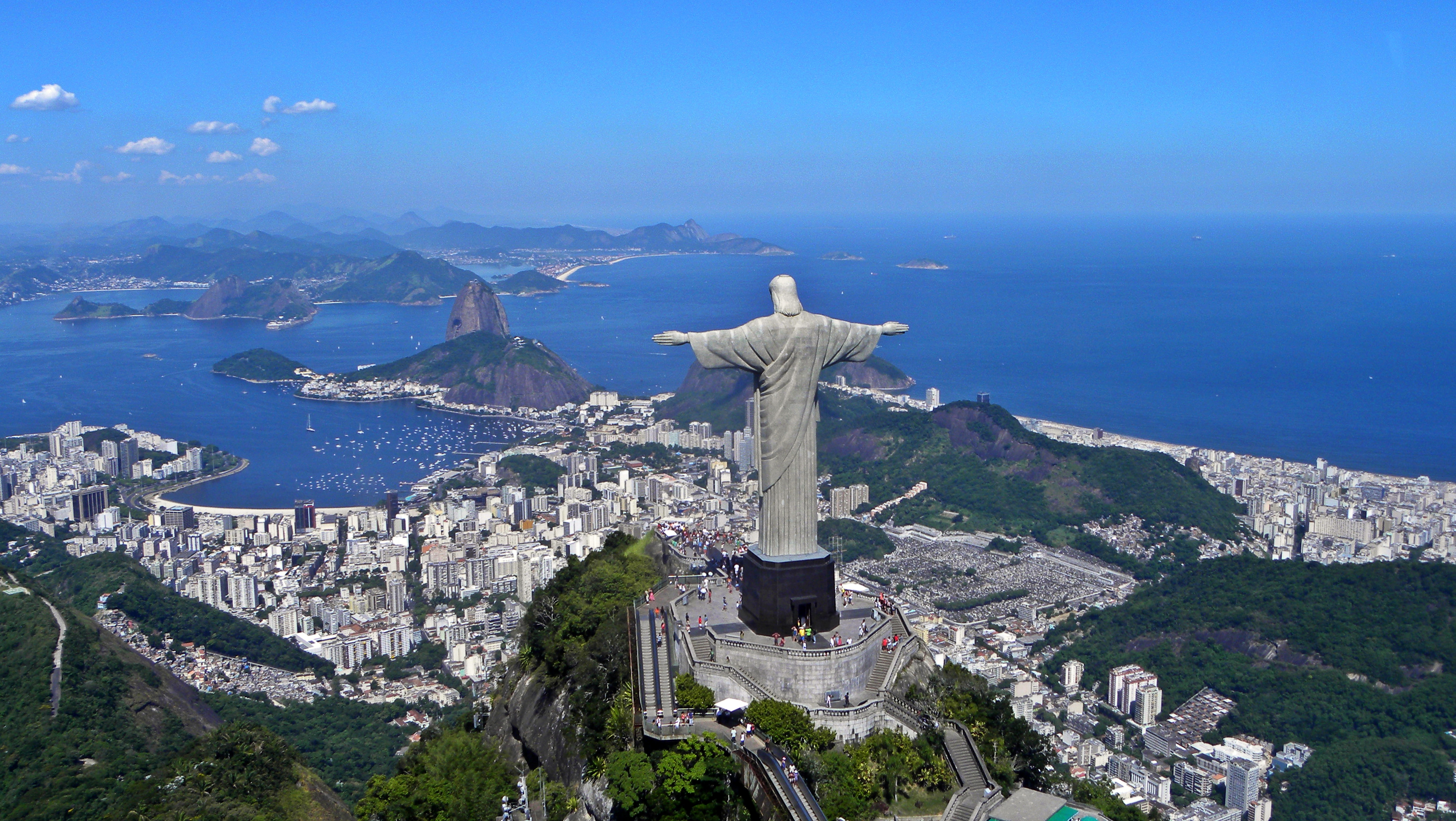
The bay area near Rio de Janeiro, Brazil – ocean, beaches and steep mountains with jungle.

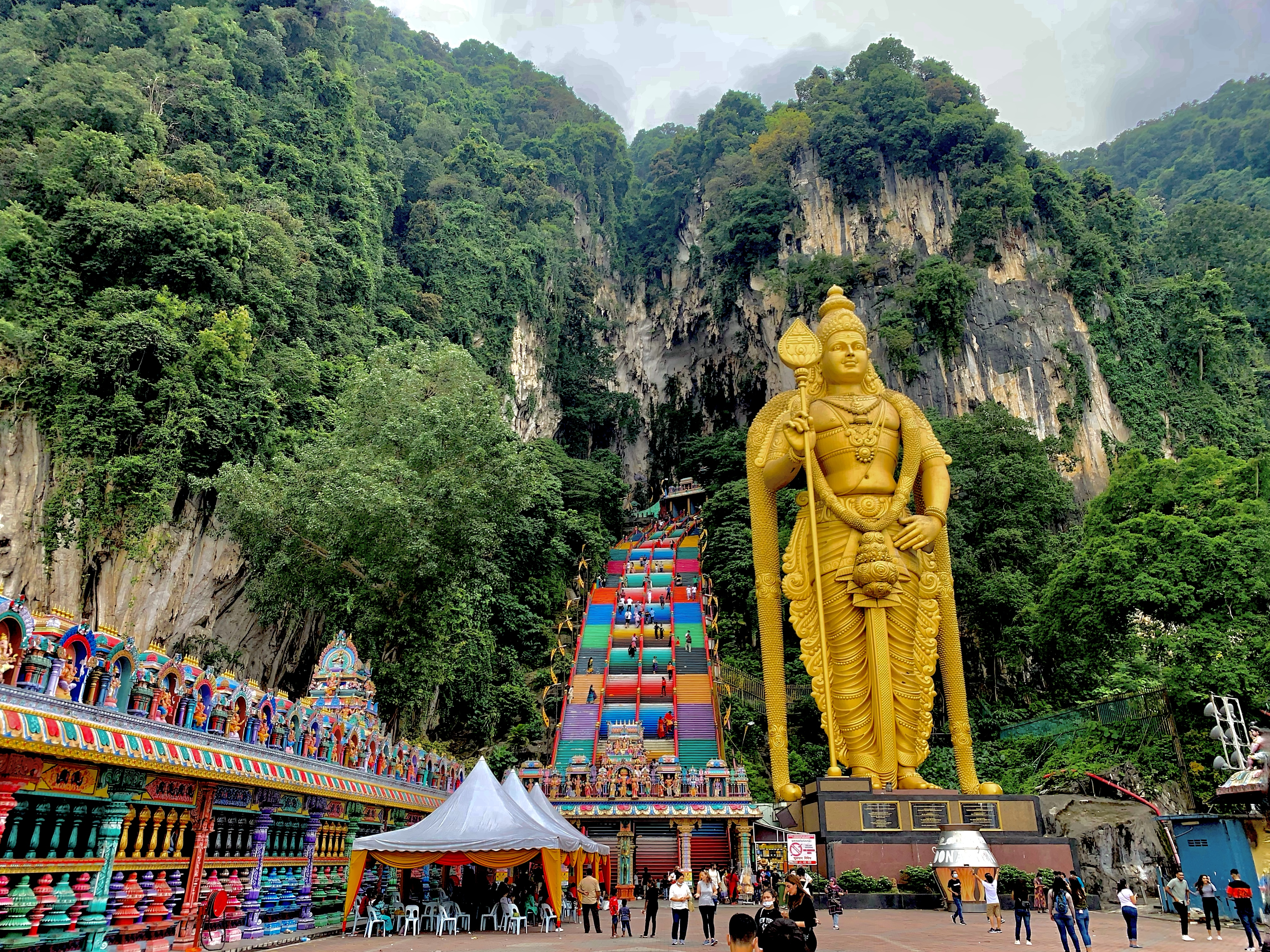
Batu Caves in Selangor, Malaysia. A series of caves and cave temples.

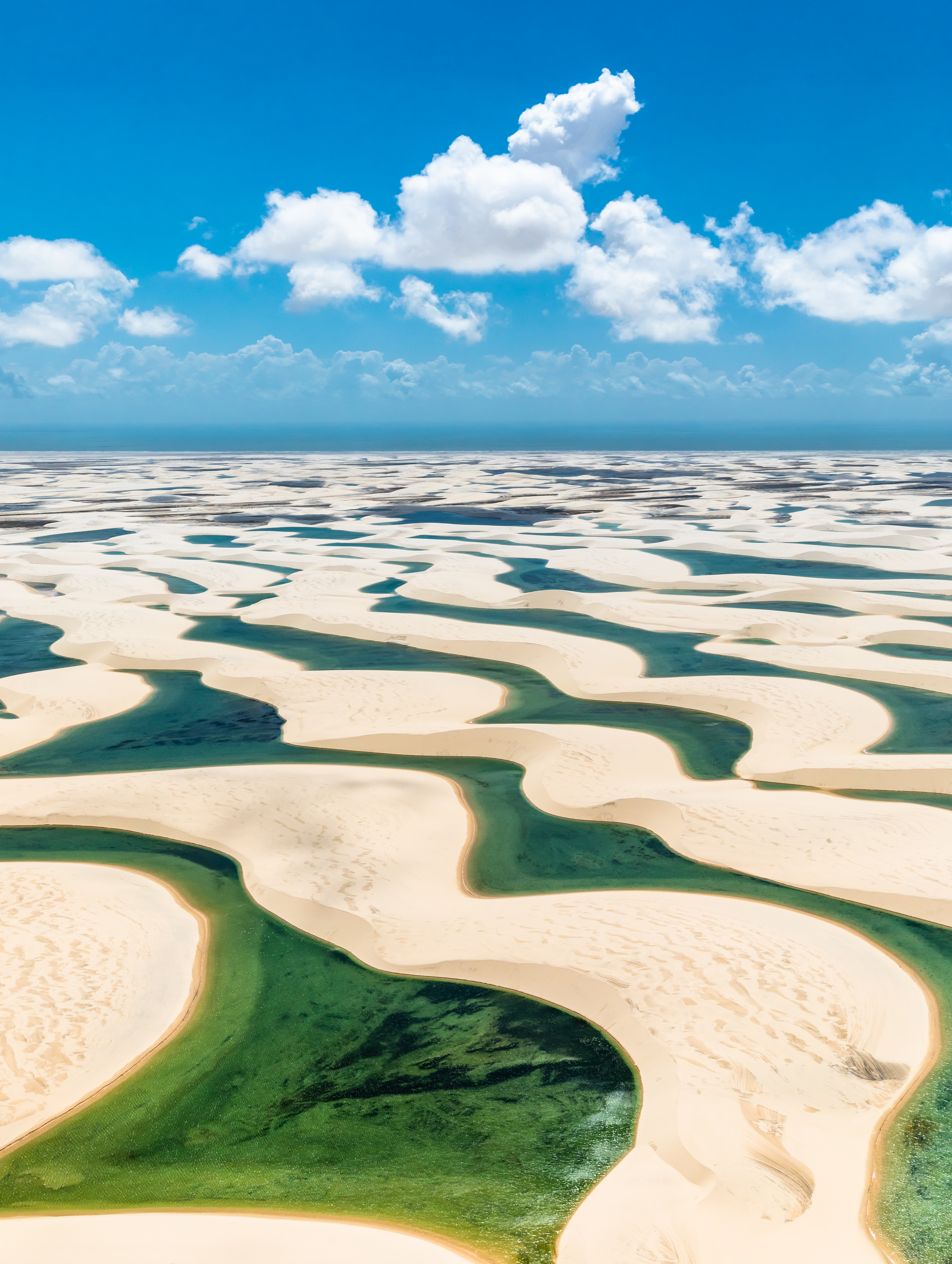
Lençóis Maranhenses, Brazil, an UNESCO World Heritage Site.

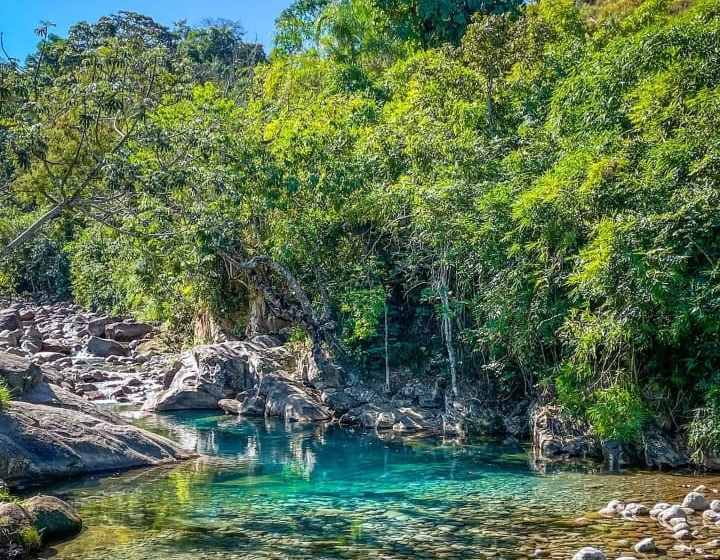
Lavrinhas, São Paulo state, it is known for its mineral water spring and crystal clear waters.

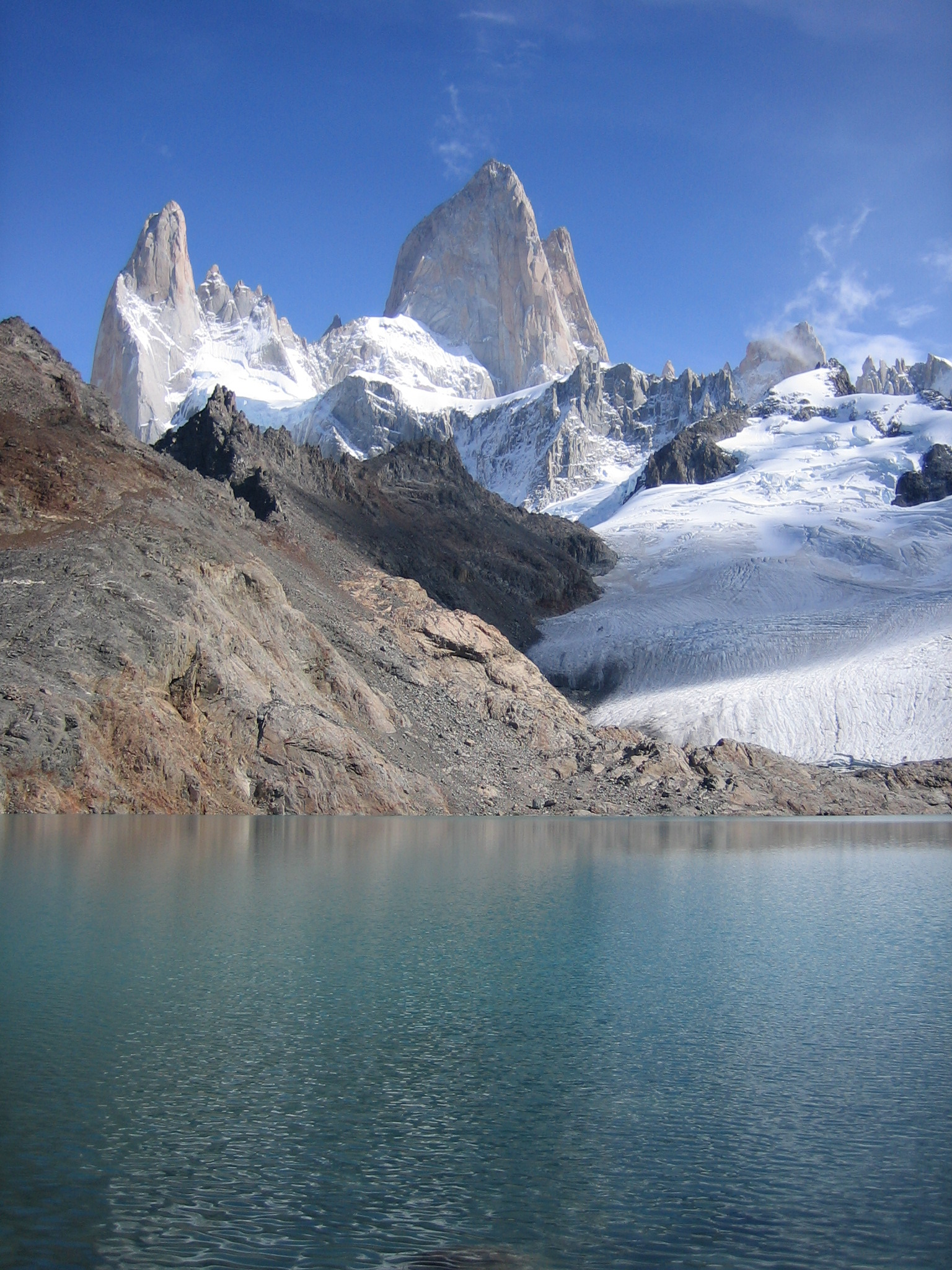
Mount Fitz Roy in Santa Cruz Province, Argentina

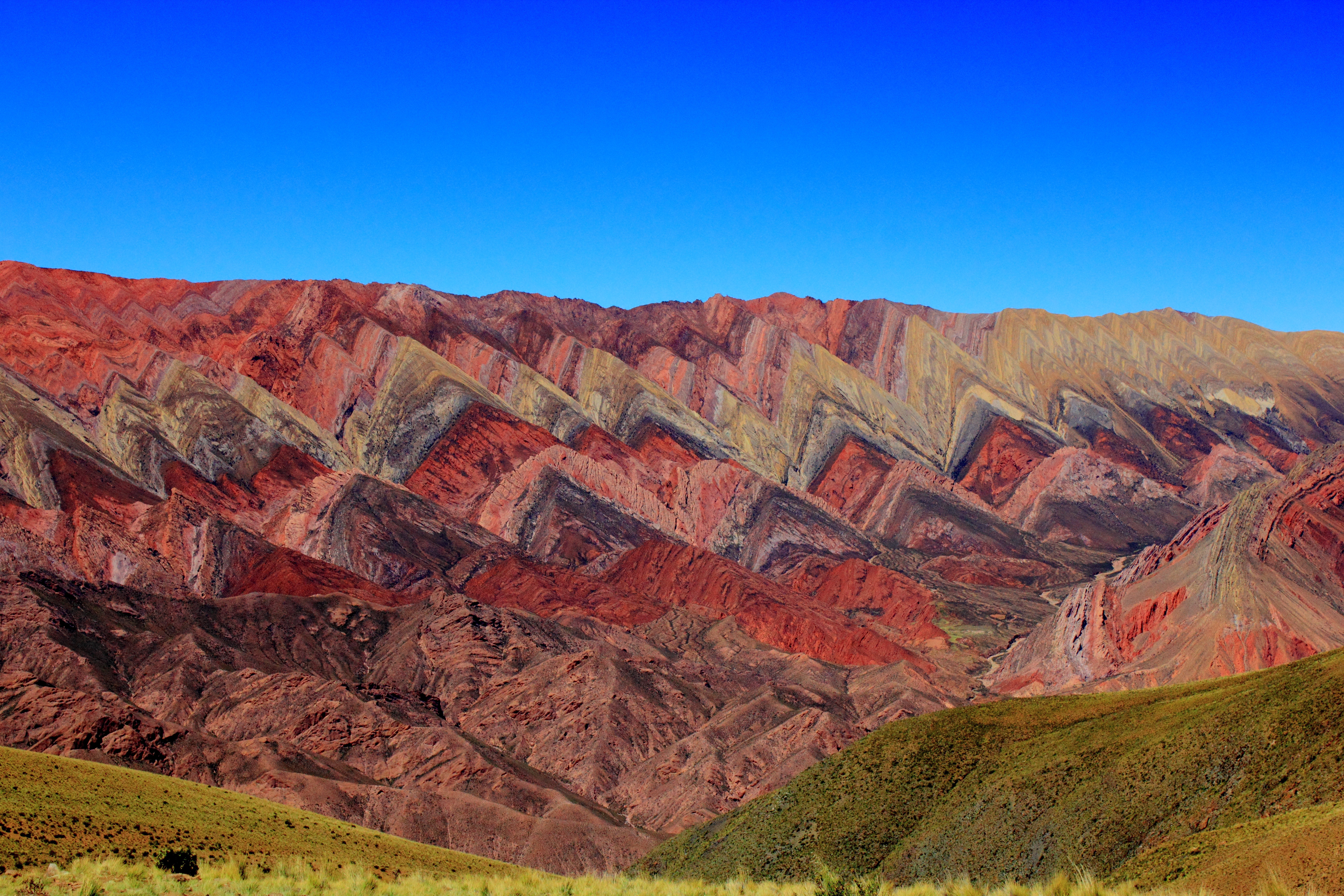
Serranía de Hornocal in Jujuy Province, Argentina

=== Cultural tourist attractions ===
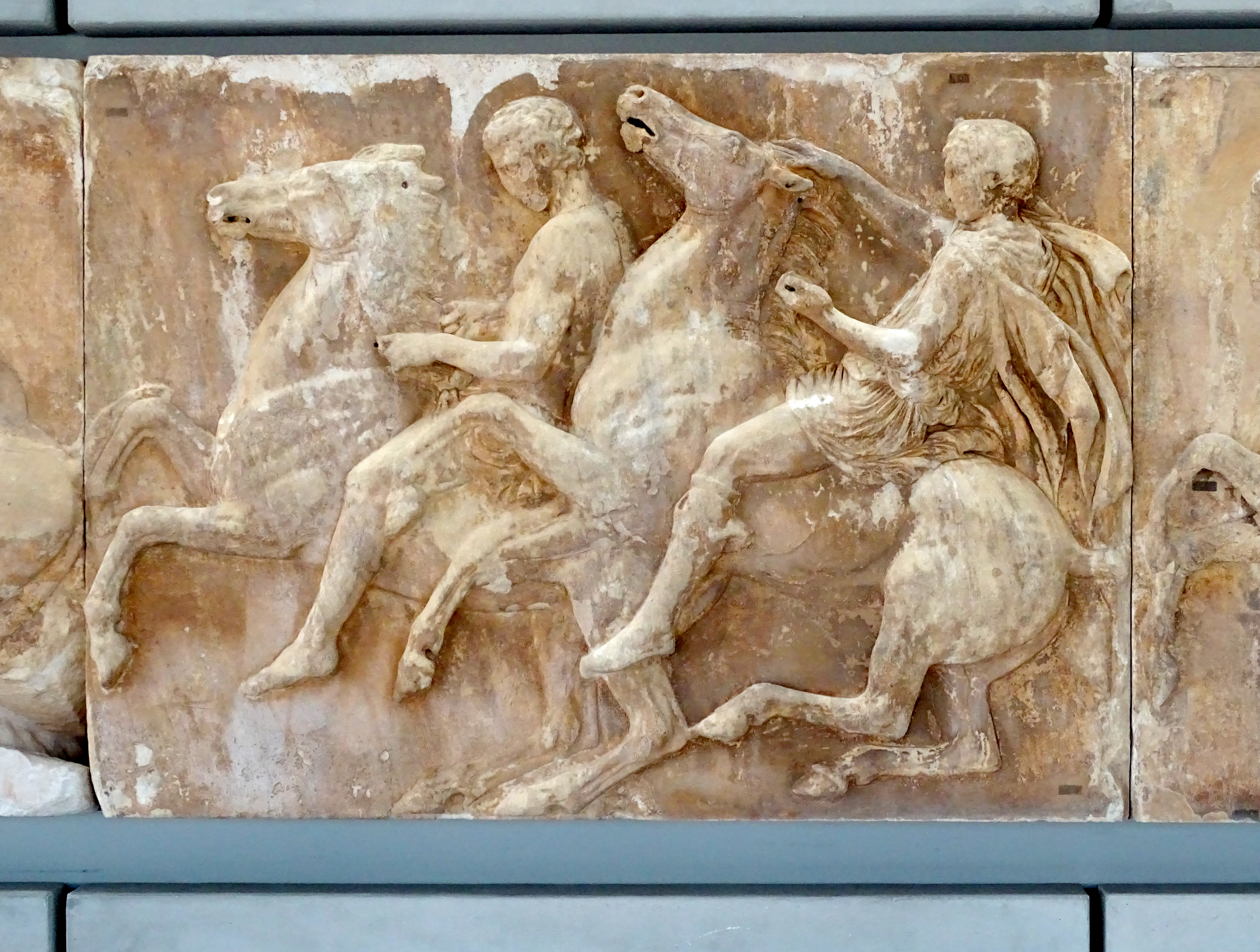
Acropolis Museum, with finds and objects from the Acropolis of Athens.

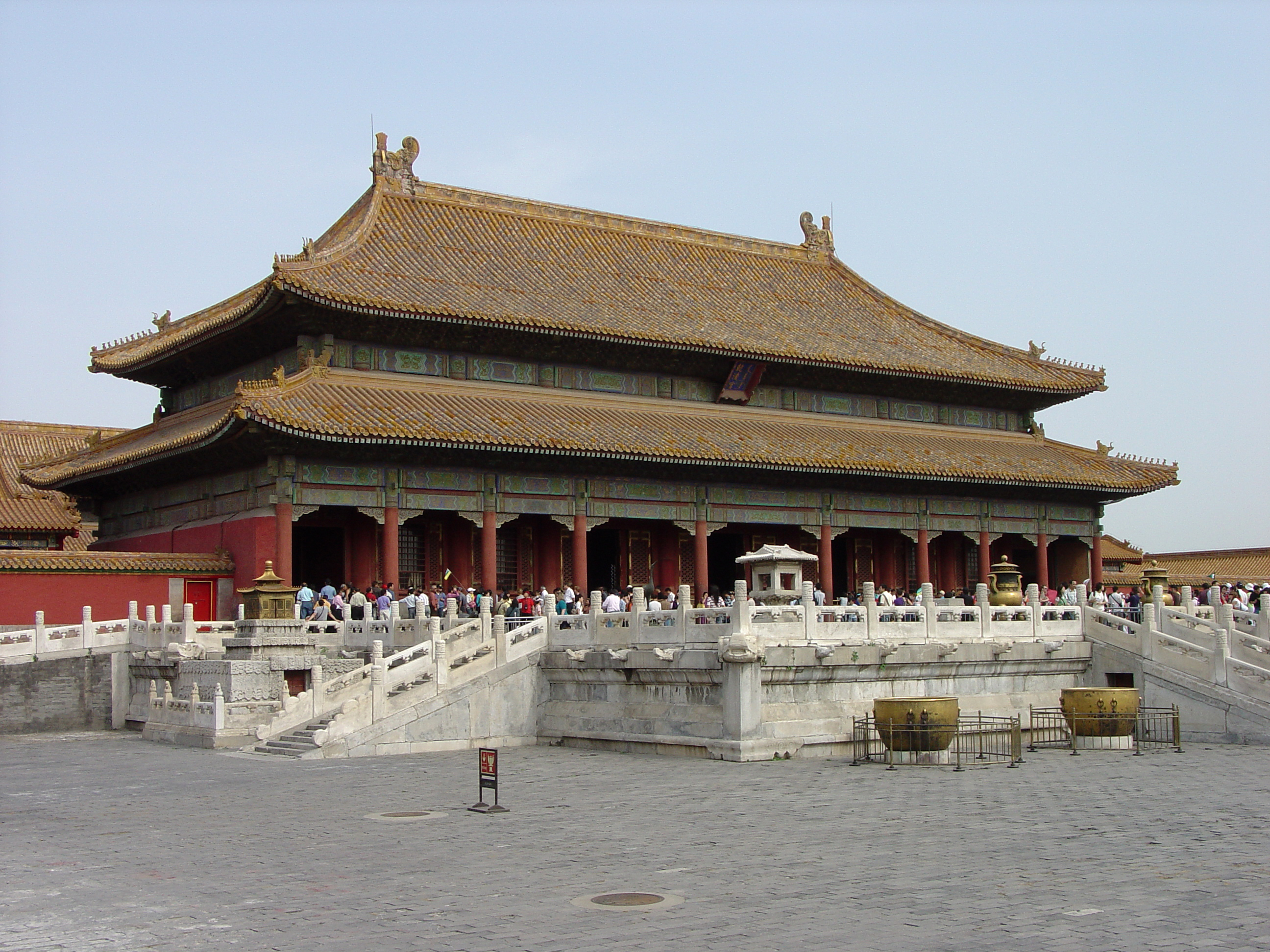
The Forbidden City, a famous building complex that housed Chinese emperors.

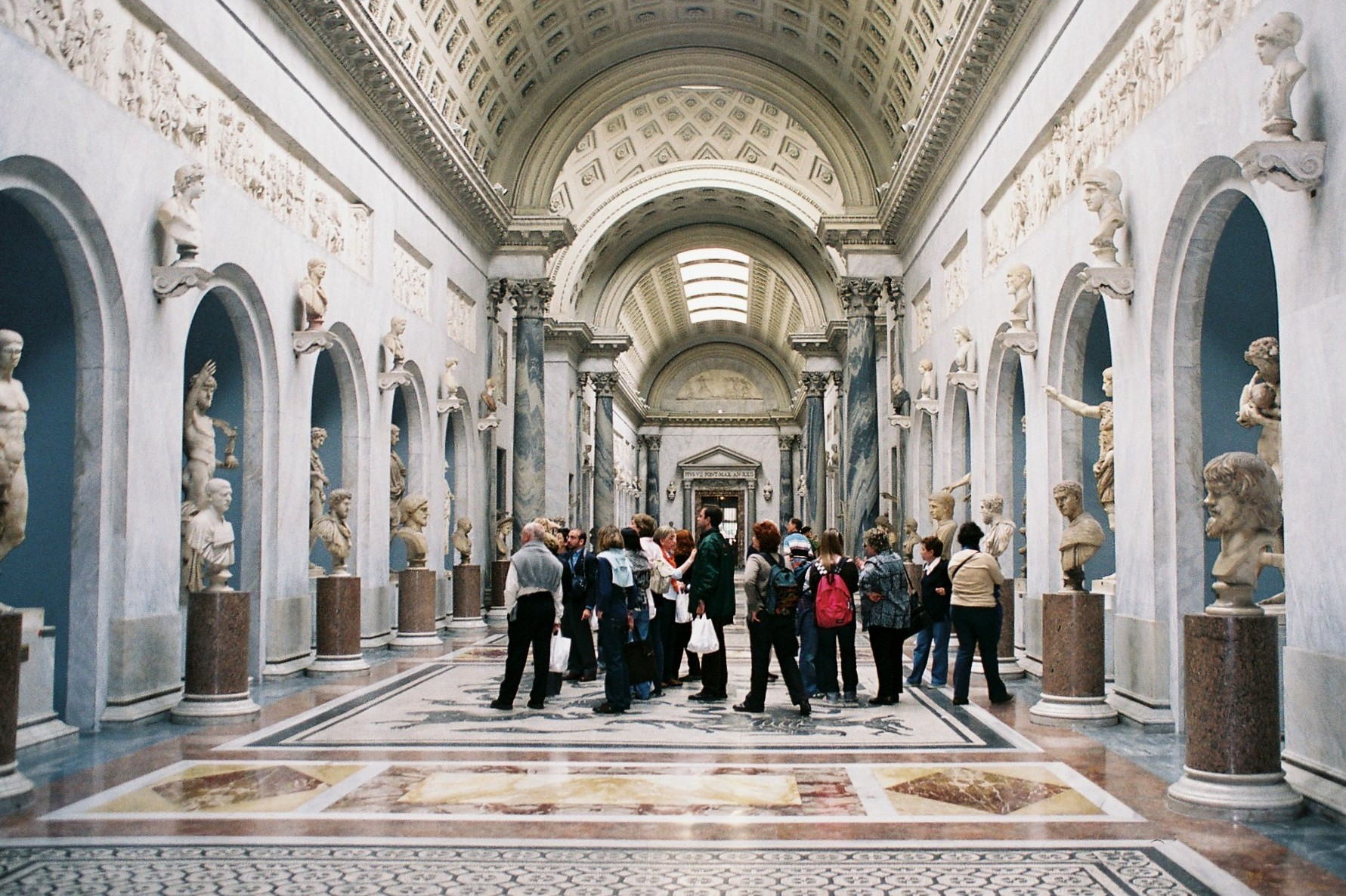
Vatican Museums, one of the most famous museums in the world.

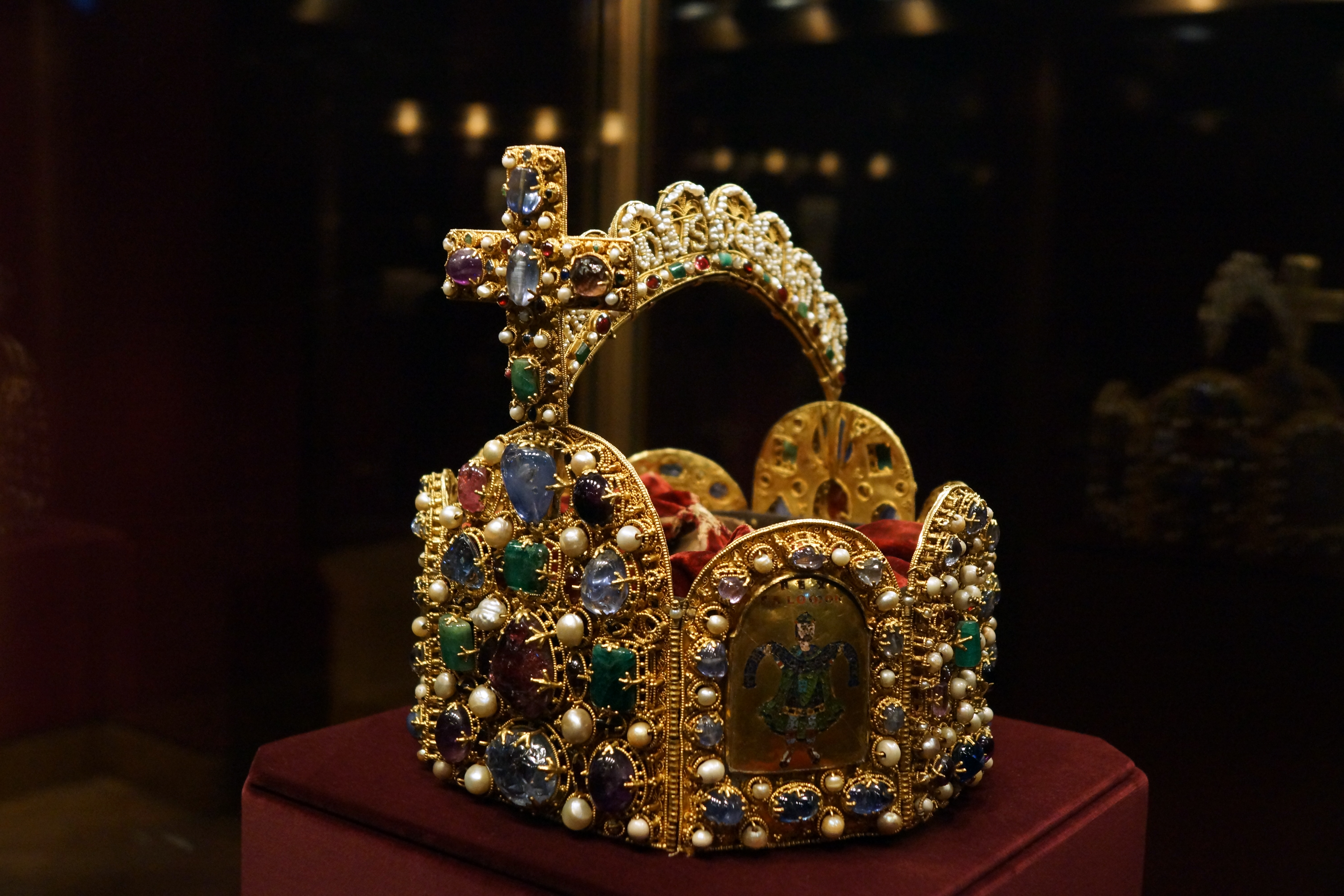
The Imperial Treasury, Vienna, holds medieval and modern treasures of the imperial House of Habsburg.

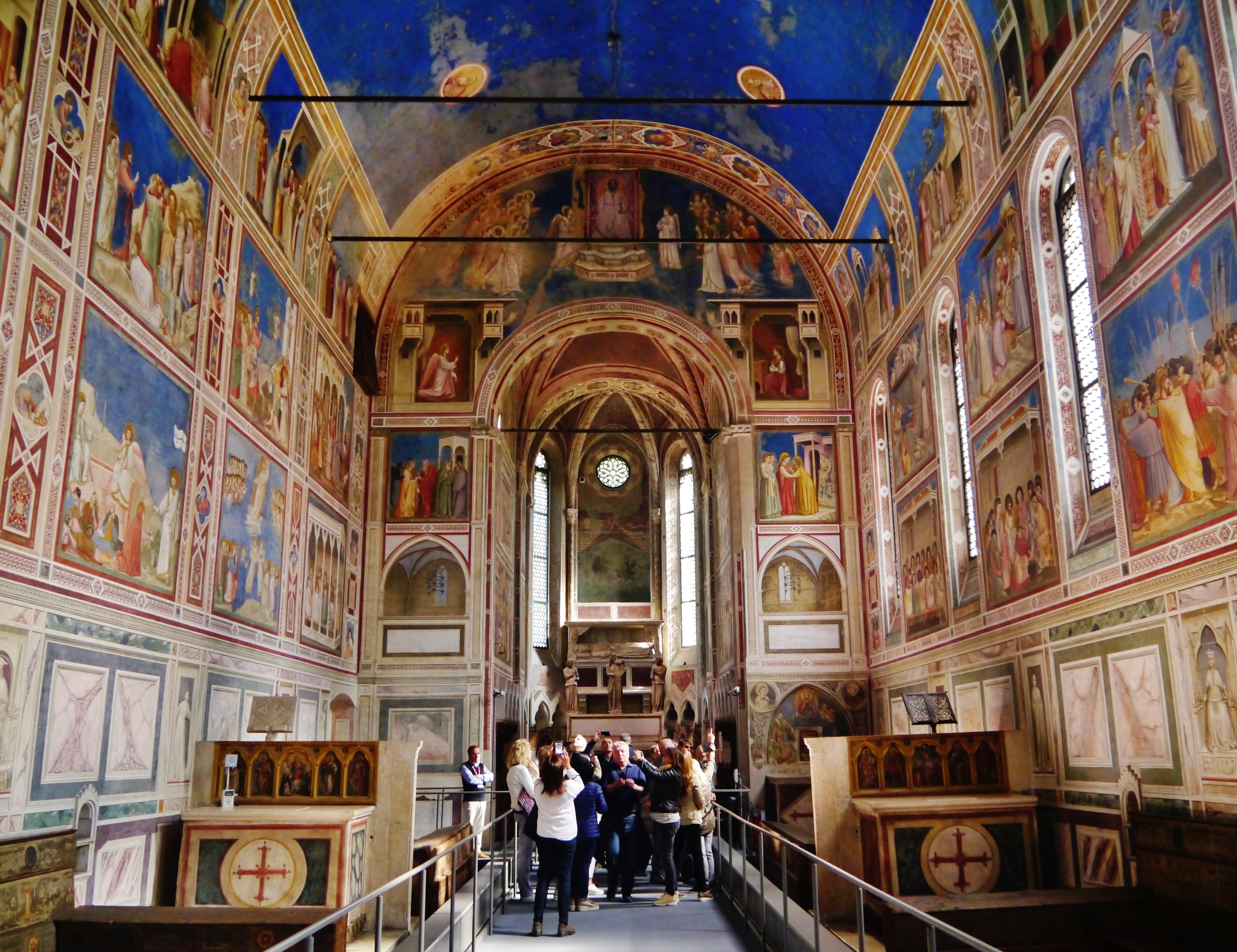
Scrovegni Chapel, with works of art by Giotto di Bondone, a pioneer of the Italian Renaissance.

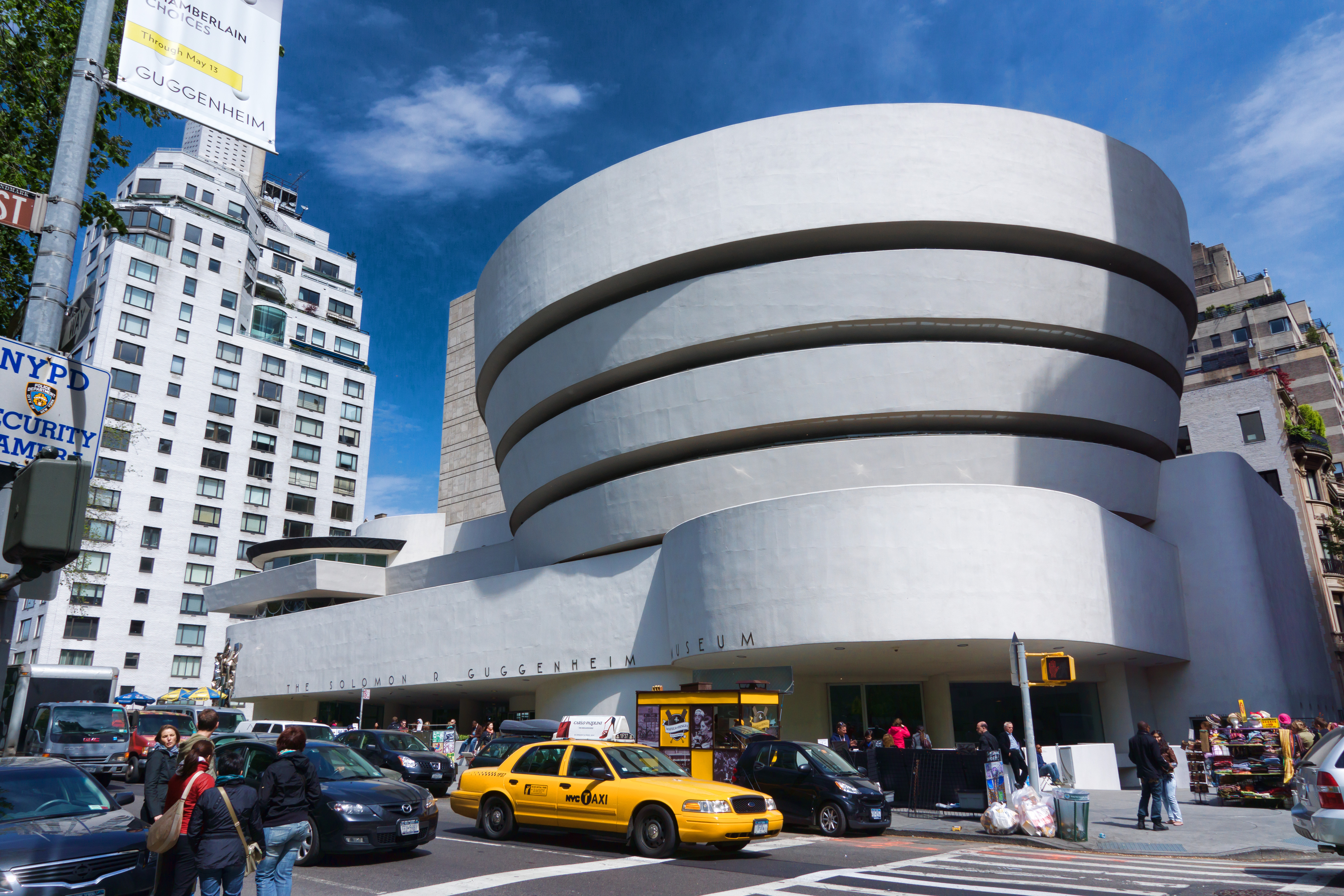
Solomon R. Guggenheim Museum, the Museum of Modern Art in New York City, founded in 1939.

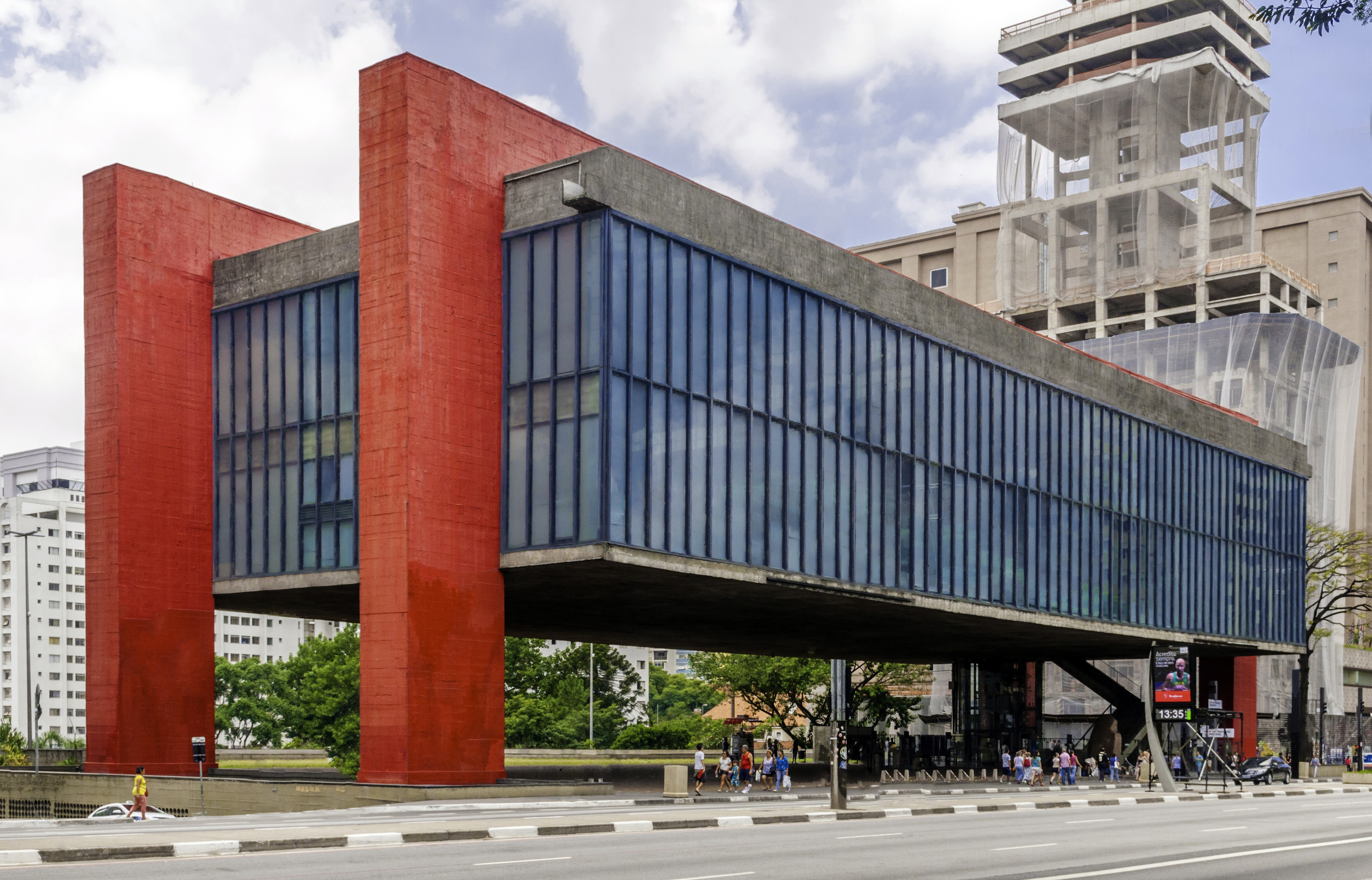
São Paulo Museum of Art. Founded in 1947, it is internationally recognized for its collection of European art.

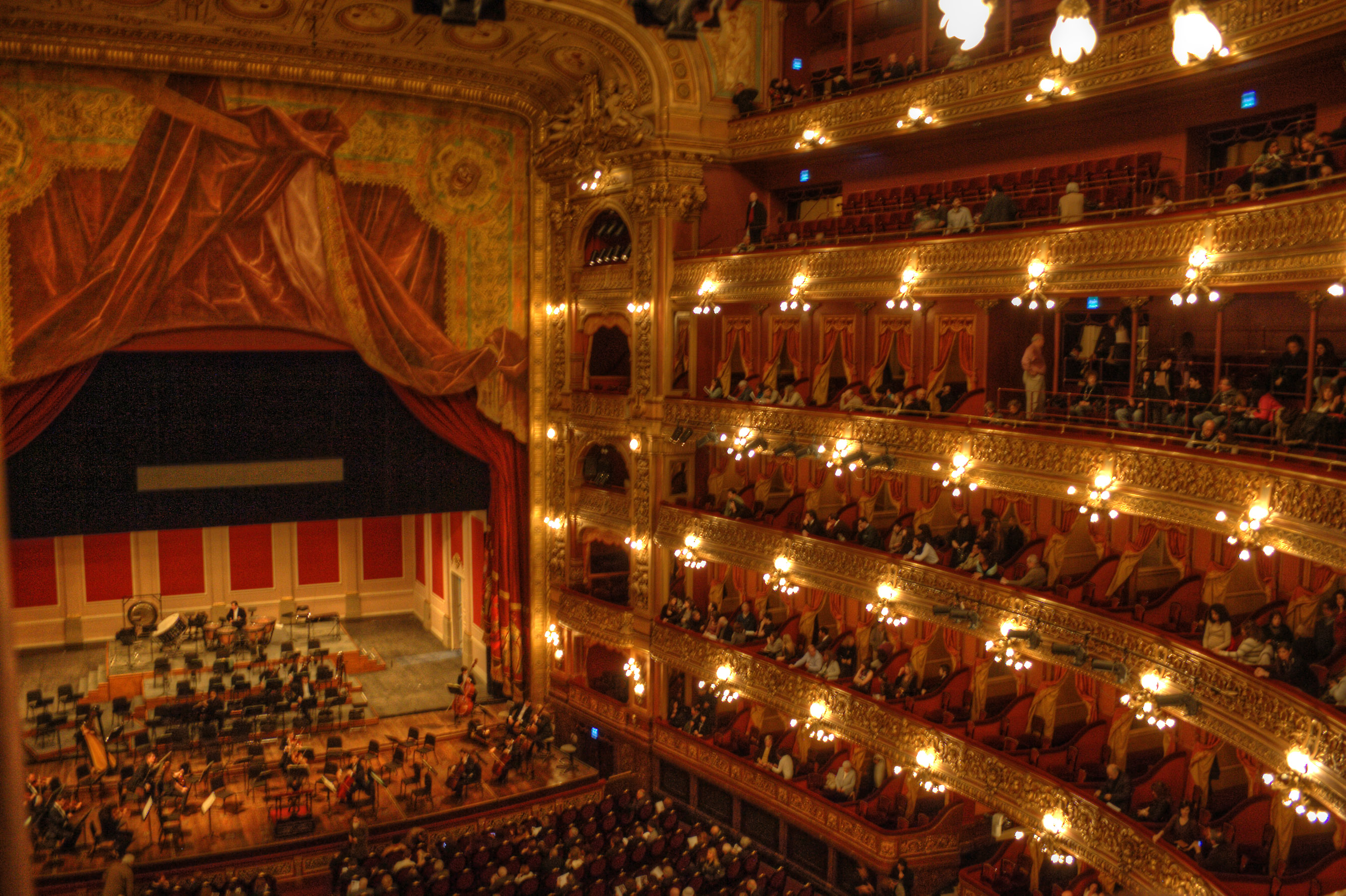
Colón Theatre in Buenos Aires, Argentina

=== Novelty attractions ===
Novelty attractions are oddities such as the 'Big Pineapple' in Queensland, Australia and 'Carhenge' in Nebraska, USA. The uniqueness of these locations is an efficient way in bringing attention to small towns or businesses, as a result of a tourist's psychological desire for new experiences. Novelty attractions are a subset of American Midwestern culture.

== Tourist destination ==
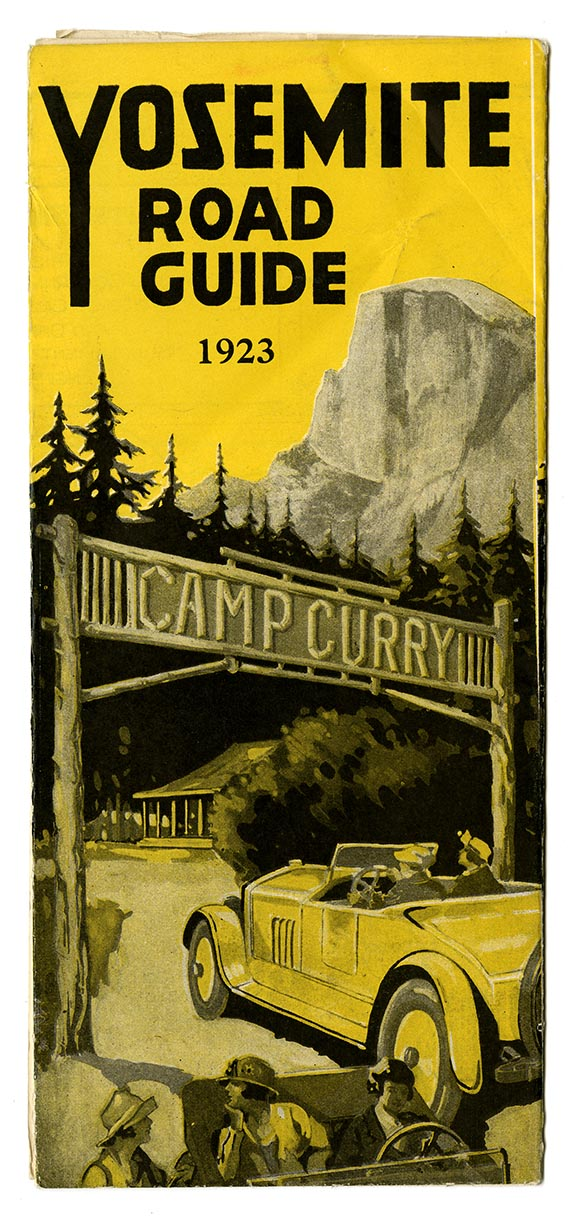
The Yosemite Park and Curry Company marketed Yosemite as a tourist destination for motorists after automobiles were legalized in the park.

A tourist destination is a city, town, or other area that is significantly dependent on revenues from tourism, or "a country, state, region, city, or town which is marketed or markets itself as a place for tourists to visit". It may contain one or more tourist attractions and possibly some "tourist traps". Fátima town, for example, is a popular tourist destination in Portugal. Siem Reap town is a popular tourist destination in Cambodia mainly owing to its proximity to the Angkor temples. The Loire valley, the third tourist destination in France, is a good example of a region marketed and branded as a place for tourists to visit, mainly known for its Châteaux of the Loire valley.

A tropical island resort is an island or archipelago that depends on tourism as its source of revenue. The Bahamas in the Caribbean, Bali in Indonesia, Phuket in Thailand, Hawaii in the United States, Fiji in the Pacific, and Santorini and Ibiza in the Mediterranean are examples of popular island resorts.

France, the United States, and Spain were the three most popular international destinations in 2017. The total number of international travelers arriving in those countries was about 234 million, contributing 8.9%, 7.7%, and 14.9%, respectively, to the total GDP of those countries.

Although some years back, Africa was lean on tourism, the continent is currently regarded as the second fastest growing tourism region with over 67 million tourists visits to Africa in 2018. Ethiopia, with a growth rate of 48.6% in 2018, is at the top of the list of African tourist centers. Other tourist locations in Africa include Cape Town, South Africa, Giza Necropolis, Egypt, The Maasai Mara National Reserve, Kenya, Victoria Falls, Zimbabwe and Zambia.

From the tourism industry supply perspective, a destination is usually defined by a geo-political boundary, and destination marketing is most commonly funded by governments. From the traveler perspective, a destination might be perceived quite differently.

== Economic impact and protection ==
Tourism generates substantial economic benefits for both host countries and tourists' home countries. Especially in developing countries, one of the primary motivations for a region to promote itself as a tourism destination is the expected economic benefit. According to the World Tourism Organization, 698 million people travelled to a foreign country in 2000, spending more than US$478 billion. International tourism receipts combined with passenger transport currently total more than US$575 billion – making tourism the world's number one export earner.

Tourist attractions can:

- contribute to government revenues; direct contributions are generated by taxes on incomes from tourism employment and tourism businesses, and by direct levies on tourists, such as departure taxes
- provide employment
- support conservation of habitats, species and historic sites
- stimulate infrastructure investment
- contribute to local economies
- provide foreign currency earnings

In the event of war, many tourist attractions are a special goal in order to cause lasting damage to the enemy or to finance the war. International attempts are therefore made to protect and preserve these economic and cultural foundations of a community, city or country. There is intensive cooperation between the United Nations, UNESCO and Blue Shield International on the protection of cultural goods and UNESCO World Heritage Sites. However, cooperation between organizations and state authorities is not enough to prevent destruction, robbery and looting. The founding president of Blue Shield International Karl von Habsburg summed it up with the words: "Without the local community and without the local participants, that would be completely impossible".

== See also ==
- Cultural tourism
- Impacts of tourism
- Overtourism
- Tourism
- World Heritage Site
- Sustainable tourism
- World Tourism Day
