= New 7 Wonders Cities =

2011–2014 polled list of global cities

New 7 Wonders Cities (2011–2014) was the third in a series of Internet-based polls operated by the New 7 Wonders Foundation. It followed New 7 Wonders of the World and New 7 Wonders of Nature.

The poll began in 2007 with more than 1200 nominees from 220 countries. A longlist of 77, limited to a maximum of one city per country, was considered by a panel headed by Federico Mayor Zaragoza, former director-general of UNESCO, which shortlisted 28 suggestions. The shortlist was then opened to a public vote. Announced in 2011, it ended in 2014 with the selection of Beirut, Doha, Durban, Havana, Kuala Lumpur, La Paz and Vigan as the winning cities.

== Winners ==
City	Country	Image	Established
Beirut	Lebanon		3000 BC
Doha	Qatar		1825
Durban	South Africa		1880
Havana	Cuba		1519
Kuala Lumpur	Malaysia		1859
La Paz	Bolivia		1548
Vigan	Philippines		1572

== Finalists ==
City	Country	Image	Established
Athens	Greece		3000 BC
Bangkok	Thailand		1782
Barcelona	Spain		218 BC
Casablanca	Morocco		15 BC
Chicago	United States		1780
Ho Chi Minh City	Vietnam		1698
Istanbul	Turkey		330
Kyoto	Japan		794
London	United Kingdom		47 AD
Mendoza	Argentina		1561
Mexico City	Mexico		1325
Mumbai	India		1507
Perth	Australia		1829
Phnom Penh	Cambodia		1372
Quito	Ecuador		1534
Reykjavík	Iceland		870
Saint Petersburg	Russia		1703
Seoul	South Korea		18 BC
Shenzhen	China		331
Vancouver	Canada		1870
