= New 7 Wonders of Nature =

2007–2011 polled list of nature sites

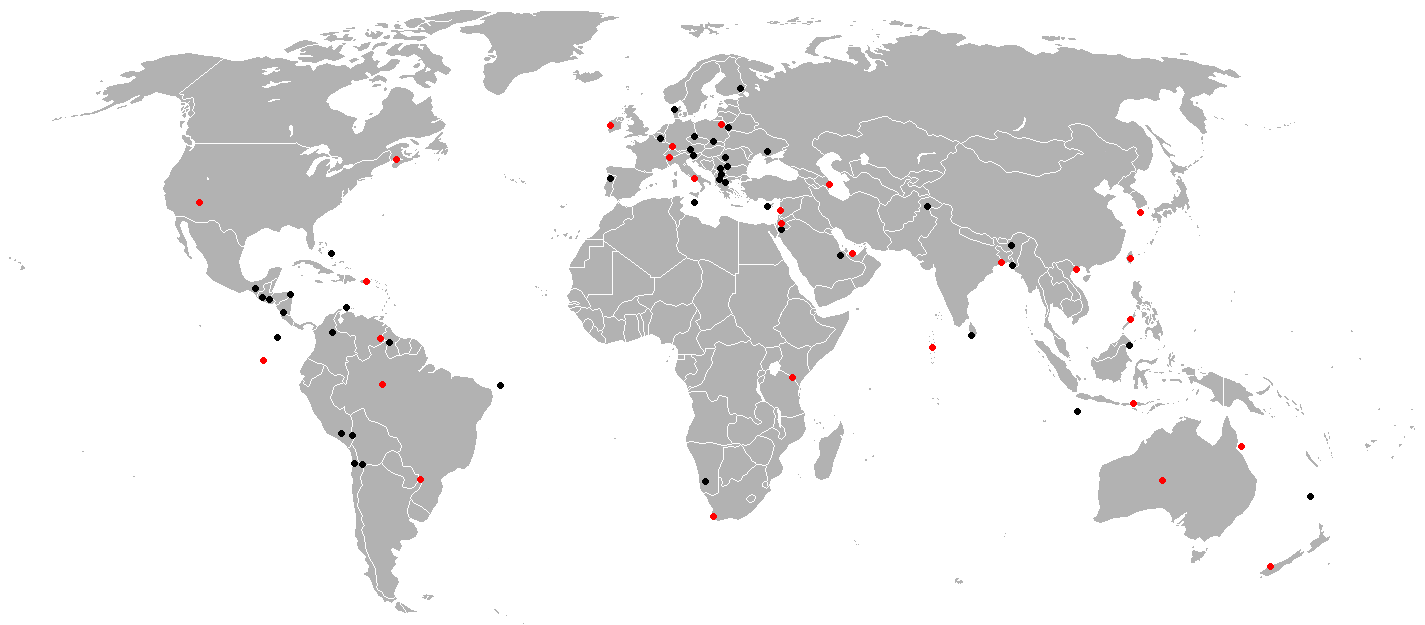
A map indicating the location of the 28 finalists (red dots) and the 43 other candidates currently on the reserve list (black dots).

New 7 Wonders of Nature (2007–2011) was an initiative started in 2007 to create a list of seven natural wonders chosen by people through a global poll. It was the second in a series of Internet-based polls led by Swiss-born Canadian Bernard Weber and organized by the New 7 Wonders Foundation, a Swiss-based foundation which Weber founded. The initiative followed an earlier New 7 Wonders of the World campaign and attracted 100 million votes from around the world before voting finished on November 11, 2011.

== Stages of the campaign ==
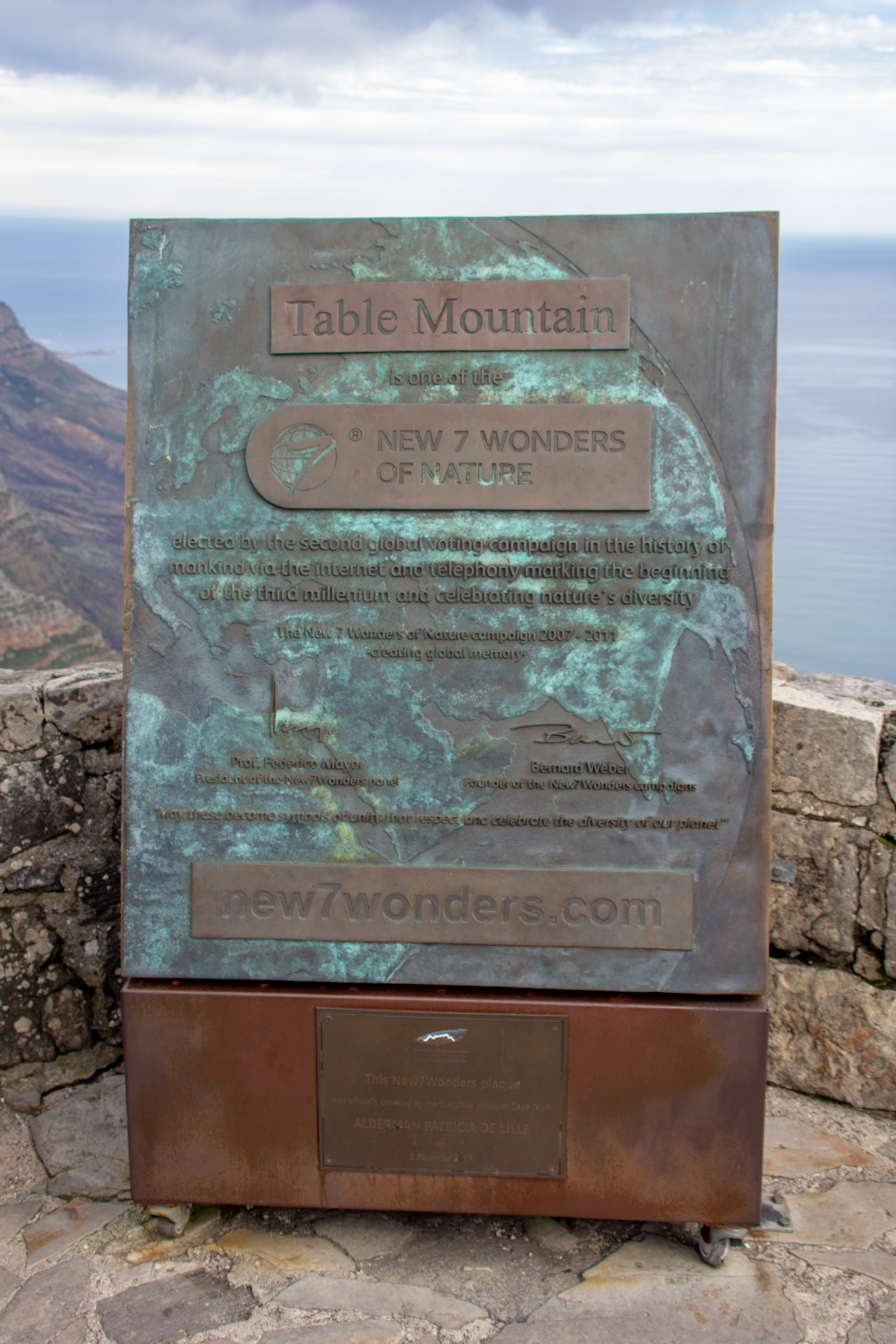
Plaque at Table Mountain

The New 7 Wonders of Nature campaign started in 2007, immediately after the campaign to elect the man-made New 7 Wonders of the World, in which more than 100 million votes were cast. From over 440 participants representing over 220 countries and through a national qualification and race to become one of the Top 77, as well as the recommendations of the Panel of Experts led by Prof. Federico Mayor, the list of 28 "Official Finalist Candidates" was determined. Voting until November 2011, during which time the New 7 Wonders World Tour planned to visit each of the finalists to allow them to present themselves to the voters across the globe.

== Criticisms ==
Indonesia's Vice-Minister for Tourism said the company running the New 7 Wonders campaign used underhanded tactics, threatening to remove Indonesia's Komodo National Park from the list if Indonesia refused to host a declaration ceremony for $35M. Nothing in the New 7 Wonders voting procedure prohibited repetitive voting, making the results subject to government and tourism industry campaigns to vote often for local sites with the financial incentive of increased tourism. Although New 7 Wonders is a non-profit organization that under US law has absolutely no disclosure of accounts, many activities related to administering voting and other logistical duties are run by the for-profit organization New Open World Corporation.

== Winners ==
Site(s)	Country/Countries	Image
Amazon Rainforest and River	Brazil, Bolivia Colombia, Ecuador, French Guiana (France), Guyana, Peru, Suriname, Venezuela	
Hạ Long Bay	Vietnam	
Jeju Island	South Korea	
Iguazú / Iguaçu Falls	Argentina, Brazil	
Puerto Princesa Subterranean River National Park	Philippines	
Komodo Island (National Park)	Indonesia	
Table Mountain (National Park)	South Africa	

== Finalists ==
Site	Country	Image
Bu Tinah Shoals	United Arab Emirates	
Dead Sea	Jordan Israel	
Great Barrier Reef	Australia	
Jeita Grotto	Lebanon	
Kilimanjaro (National Park)	Tanzania	
Masurian Lake District	Poland	
Sundarbans	Bangladesh India	
Maldives	Maldives	
Angel Falls	Venezuela	
Bay of Fundy (National Park)	Canada	
Black Forest	Germany	
Cliffs of Moher	Ireland	
El Yunque	Puerto Rico	
Galapagos Islands (National Park)	Ecuador	
Grand Canyon (National Park)	United States	
Matterhorn / Cervino	Italy, Switzerland	
Milford Sound	New Zealand	
Mud Volcanoes	Azerbaijan	
Uluru (National Park)	Australia	
Vesuvius (National Park)	Italy	
Yushan (National Park)	Taiwan	

== Top 77 ==
Site	Country
Al-hasa Oasis	Saudi Arabia
Askania-Nova	Ukraine
Atacama Desert	Chile
Azure Window	Malta
Belogradchik Rocks	Bulgaria
Bialowieza Forest	Belarus/ Poland
Chicamocha Canyon	Colombia
Christmas Island	Christmas Island
Coatepeque Lake	El Salvador
Cocos Island	Costa Rica
Colca Canyon	Peru
Conchi	Aruba
Cox's Bazar	Bangladesh
Dean's Blue Hole	Bahamas
Djavolja Varos	Serbia
Douro River	Portugal
Eisriesenwelt	Austria
Fernando de Noronha	Brazil
Han-Sur-Lesse	Belgium
Kaieteur Falls	Guyana
Kaziranga National Park	India
Laguna Colorada	Bolivia
Lake Atitlan	Guatemala
Lake Bled	Slovenia
Lake Ohrid	Albania/ North Macedonia
Lake Saiful Maluk	Pakistan
Lake Saimaa	Finland
Lake Titicaca	Bolivia/ Peru
Mount Olympus	Greece
Norfolk Island (National Park)	Norfolk Island
Ometepe Island	Nicaragua
Platano Forest	Honduras
Pravcice Gate	Czech Republic
Retezat (National Park)	Romania
Rock of Aphrodite	Cyprus
Sinharaja Rainforest	Sri Lanka
Sipadan Island	Malaysia
Sossusvlei	Namibia
Štrbské Pleso Lake	Slovakia
Sumidero Canyon	Mexico
Thy National Park	Denmark
Vrelo Caves in Matka Canyon	North Macedonia
Wadi Rum	Jordan

Note. The list contains those eligible who were considered by the experts, the 77 main nominees, minus the 28 finalists, minus the 6 of those who were not eligible due to the rules of participation, that is 43.

== See also ==
- New 7 Wonders Cities
- New 7 Wonders of the World
- Wonders of the World
