= Bu Tinah =

Protected archipelago in United Arab Emirates

- Arabic: بوطينة
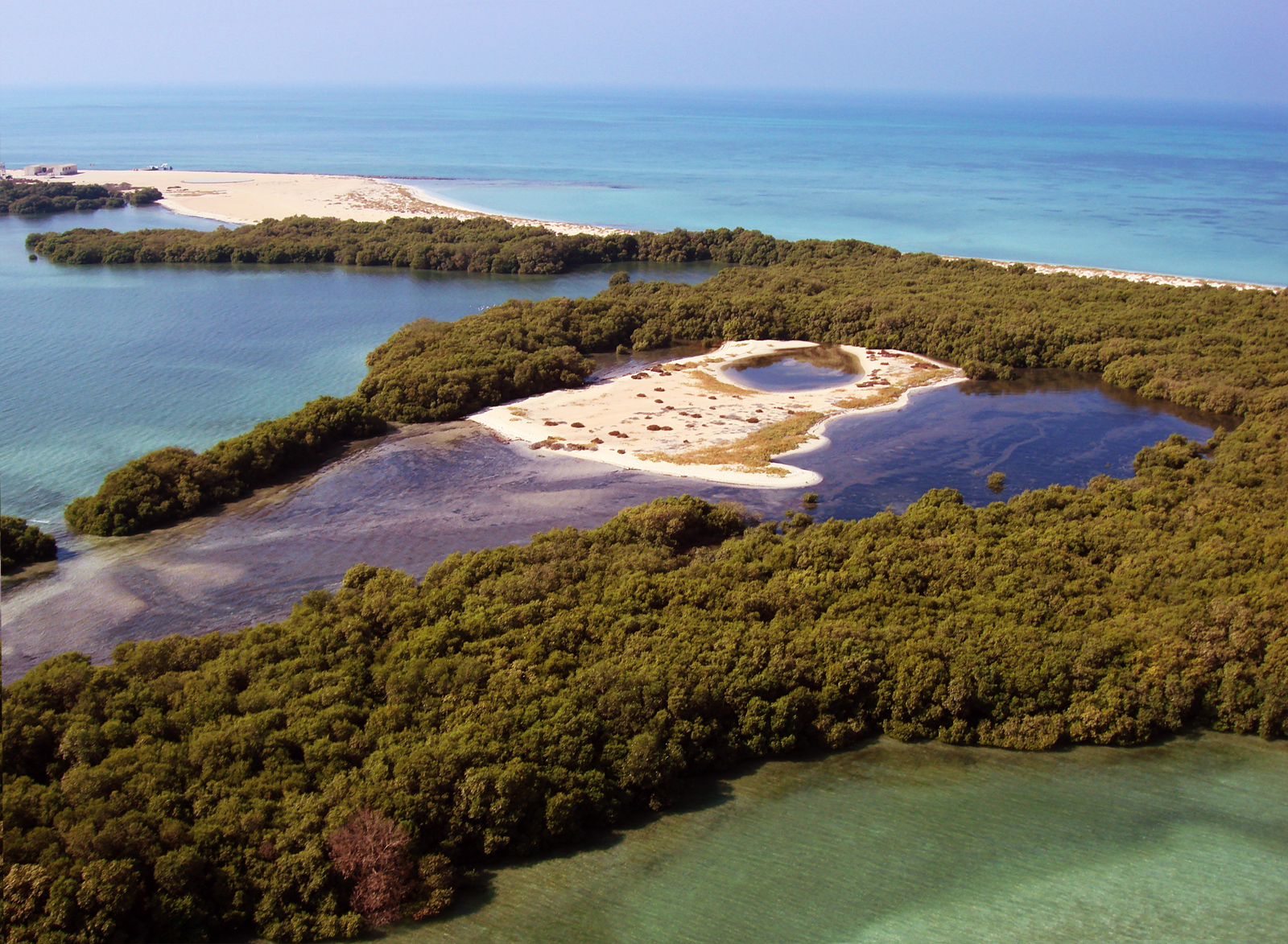
- An aerial photo of the Bu Tinah island off the western coastline of Abu Dhabi

- Location within United Arab Emirates
- Location: Al Dhafra, Abu Dhabi
- Nearest city: Abu Dhabi
- Coordinates: 24°36′06″N 53°04′49″E

Bu Tinah (Arabic: بوطينة, Būṭīnah, pronounced [ˈbuːtˤiːn æ]) is a tiny archipelago amid extensive coral formations and seagrass beds some 25 km south of Zirku and 35 north of Marawah in the United Arab Emirates. Found in the waters of Abu Dhabi, it is protected as a private nature reserve. Bu Tinah Island, rich in biodiversity, lies within the Marawah Marine Biosphere Reserve with a territory of more than 4,000 km^{2}. The biosphere reserve is the region's first and largest UNESCO-designated marine biosphere reserve. It has been a recognized UNESCO site since 2001. Closed to visitors, fishing and the collection of turtle eggs are prohibited on Bu Tinah Island; the ban being enforced by patrols. An Environment Agency-Abu Dhabi Ranger Station is located on the island.

== Archipelago ==
Bu Tinah is a cluster of islands and shoals, joined or almost so at low water, with no point that is more than two or three metres above sea level. The main island has a sheltered lagoon opening to the south with the low energy environment permitting stands of mature mangrove to flourish. Even birds like the Socotra cormorant are found here. There are also healthy coral reef habitats with as many as 16 species of coral recorded in the area. The reefs survive in conditions that would kill coral species in other parts of the world. The waters of the Persian Gulf are among the most saline in the world, as well as among the warmest. Corals live in water that is between 23 °C and 28 °C but in the UAE water temperatures go as high as 35 °C in summer.

Bu Tinah Island is one of the 28 official finalists for the “New 7 Wonders of Nature.”

== Flora and fauna ==
Bu Tinah's thriving habitat is a unique living laboratory, with key significance for climate change research. This distinctive natural habitat with its shallow waters, seagrass beds and tall mangroves, set amid extensive coral reefs, hosts rare and globally endangered marine life. Seabirds such as the flamingo and the osprey, diverse species of dolphins, including the endangered Indian Ocean Humpback Dolphin, and the rare hawksbill turtle are found in Bu Tinah. The island's waters are also home to the planet's second-largest population of dugong, a large marine mammal that is globally threatened. Some 600 out of the estimated 3,000 dugongs in the country live in the waters around Bu Tinah and the creatures are listed as a species vulnerable to extinction by the IUCN. This precious natural resource is part of the largest protected area in Abu Dhabi. Its significant coral community and the health of its habitats and species despite its high temperature and salinity levels make the island of keen scientific interest.

=== Green turtles ===
In 2018 a team of Environment Agency - Abu Dhabi and Emirates Nature - WWF marine scientists satellite tagged a number of Green sea turtles at Bu Tinah. In a first for science in the region, three of the tagged turtles were mapped swimming more than 6000 km over the course of seven months, travelling around the Musandam Peninsula through the Strait of Hormuz to Ras al Hadd (near the eastern tip of the Arabian Peninsula, Ras al-Jinz) in Oman to nest, and back to Bu Tinah. The study shows previously unknown linkages between Green sea turtles in the UAE and Oman. Bu Tinah features in the Environment Agency - Abu Dhabi documentary Wild Abu Dhabi: The Turtles of Al Dhafra, which won a finalist award at the New York Festival TV and Film Awards in the Nature & Wildlife documentary category.

=== Important Bird Area ===
The archipelago has been designated an Important Bird Area (IBA) by BirdLife International because it supports breeding Socotra cormorants and wintering Siberian sand plovers.
