= New 7 Wonders of the World =

Online popularity poll in 2007 to pick new Wonders of the World

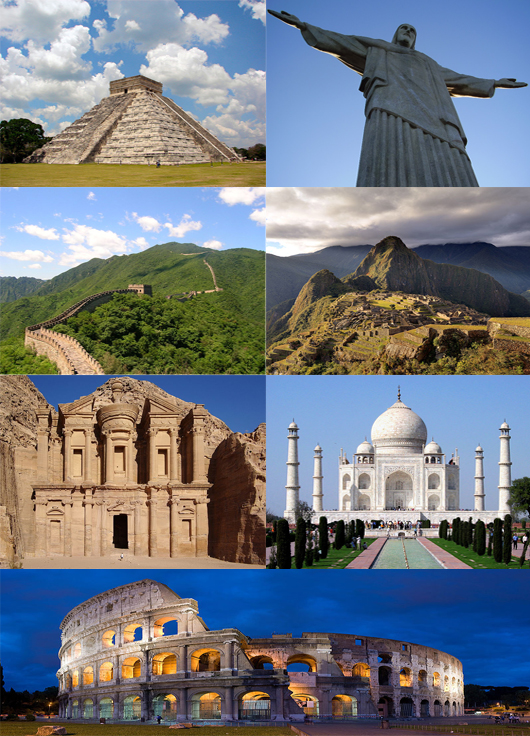
From left to right, top to bottom: Chichén Itzá, Christ the Redeemer, the Great Wall of China, Machu Picchu, Petra, the Taj Mahal, and the Colosseum

The New 7 Wonders of the World was a campaign started in 2001 to choose Wonders of the World from a selection of 200 existing monuments. The popularity poll via free web-based voting and telephone voting was led by Canadian-Swiss Bernard Weber and organized by the New 7 Wonders Foundation (N7W) based in Zurich, Switzerland, with winners announced on 7 July 2007 at Estádio da Luz in Lisbon. The poll was considered unscientific partly because participants were allowed to vote repeatedly. According to John Zogby, founder and current President/CEO of the US polling organization Zogby International, New 7 Wonders Foundation drove "the largest poll on record".

The program drew a wide range of official reactions. Some countries touted their finalist and tried to get more votes cast for it, while others downplayed or criticized the contest. After supporting the New 7 Wonders Foundation at the beginning of the campaign by providing advice on nominee selection, the United Nations Educational, Scientific, and Cultural Organization (UNESCO), bound by its bylaws to record and give equal status to all World Heritage Sites, distanced itself from the undertaking in 2001 and again in 2007.

The 7 winners were chosen from 21 candidates, which had been whittled down from 77 choices by a panel in 2006.

The New 7 Wonders Foundation, established in 2001, relied on private donations and the sale of broadcast rights and received no public funding. After the final announcement, New 7 Wonders said it did not earn anything from the exercise and barely recovered its investment. Although N7W describes itself as a not-for-profit organization, the company behind it, the New Open World Corporation (NOWC), is a commercial business. All licensing and sponsorship money is paid to NOWC.

The foundation ran two subsequent programs: New 7 Wonders of Nature, the subject of voting until 2011, and New 7 Wonders Cities, which ended in 2014.

== Winners ==
Location of the New 7 Wonders winners

The pyramids at Giza Necropolis in Egypt, which include the Great Pyramid, the only surviving of the original Seven Wonders of the Ancient World, were granted honorary status.

Wonder	Location	Image	Year
Giza Pyramids (honorary status)	Giza Necropolis, Egypt	Pyramide Kheops	2560 BC
Petra	Ma'an, Jordan	Ad Deir ("The Monastery")	40 AD
Colosseum	Rome, Italy	The Colosseum at dusk: exterior view of the best-preserved section	80 AD
Chichén Itzá	Yucatán, Mexico	El Castillo being climbed by tourists	600 AD
Great Wall of China	China	The Great Wall of China (Mutianyﺁ section)	1368 AD
Machu Picchu	Cuzco Region, Peru	Machu Picchu in Peru	1450 AD
Taj Mahal	Agra, India	Taj	1643 AD
Christ the Redeemer	Rio de Janeiro, Brazil	Christ the Redeemer in Rio de Janeiro	1931 AD

== Reactions given ==
=== United Nations ===
In 2007, the New 7 Wonders Foundation contracted a partnership with the United Nations in recognition of the efforts to promote the UN's Millennium Development Goals.

However, the United Nations Educational, Scientific and Cultural Organization (UNESCO), in a press release on June 20, 2007, reaffirmed that it has no link with the initiative. The press release concluded:

There is no comparison between Mr Weber's mediatised campaign and the scientific and educational work resulting from the inscription of sites on UNESCO's World Heritage List. The list of the "7 New Wonders of the World" will be the result of a private undertaking, reflecting only the opinions of those with access to the internet and not the entire world. This initiative cannot, in any significant and sustainable manner, contribute to the preservation of sites elected by this public.

— UNESCO

=== Brazil ===
In Brazil there was a campaign Vote no Cristo (Vote for the Christ) which had the support of private companies, namely telecommunications operators that stopped charging voters to make telephone calls and SMS messages to vote. Additionally, leading corporate sponsors including Banco Bradesco and Rede Globo spent millions of reals in the effort to have the statue voted into the top seven. Newsweek reports the campaign was so pervasive that:

One morning in June, Rio de Janeiro residents awoke to a beeping text message on their cell phones: "Press 4916 and vote for Christ. It's free!" The same pitch had been popping up all over the city since late January—flashing across an electronic screen every time city-dwellers swiped their transit cards on city buses and echoing on TV infomercials that featured a reality-show celebrity posing next to the city's trademark Christ the Redeemer statue.

— Elizabeth Dwoskin, Newsweek

According to an article in Newsweek, around 10 million Brazilians had voted in the contest by early July. This number is estimated as the New 7 Wonders Foundation never released such details about the campaign. An airplane message, with a huge inscription "4916 VOTE FOR CHRIST" flew in Rio de Janeiro for a month.

=== Peru ===
An intensive campaign led by the Peruvian Ministry of Commerce and Tourism in Peru had a great impact in the media and consequently, Peruvian people voted massively for its national wonder. The announcement of the new World Wonders generated great expectations and the election of Machu Picchu was celebrated nationwide.

=== Chile ===
The Chilean representative for Easter Island's Moais, Alberto Hortus, said Weber gave him a letter saying that the Moais had finished eighth and were morally one of the New 7 Wonders. Hortus said he was the only participant to receive such an apology.

=== India ===
A campaign to publicize the Taj Mahal in India gathered speed and it reached a climax in July 2007 with news channels, radio stations, and many celebrities asking people to vote for the Taj Mahal.

=== Jordan ===
Queen Rania of Jordan joined the campaign to back Petra, Jordan's national treasure.

=== Mexico ===
There was a campaign on the news programs to encourage people to vote for Chichen Itzá.

== Other finalists ==
The 13 other finalists chronologically are:

Wonder	Location	Image	Year
Stonehenge	Amesbury, United Kingdom		2400 BC
Acropolis of Athens	Athens, Greece		447 BC
Hagia Sophia	Istanbul, Turkey		537 AD
Angkor Wat	Angkor, Cambodia		1113 AD
Moai	Easter Island, Chile		1250 AD
Timbuktu	Timbuktu, Mali		1327 AD
Alhambra	Granada, Spain		1333 AD
Kremlin and Red Square	Moscow, Russia		1561 AD
Kiyomizu-dera	Kyoto, Japan		1633 AD
Neuschwanstein Castle	Füssen, Germany		1869 AD
Statue of Liberty	New York City, United States		1886 AD
Eiffel Tower	Paris, France		1887 AD
Sydney Opera House	Sydney, Australia		1973 AD
