= Skrjabingylus nasicola =

Scientific classification
- Kingdom: Animalia
- Phylum: Nematoda
- Class: Chromadorea
- Order: Rhabditida
- Family: Metastrongylidae
- Genus: Skrjabingylus
- Species: S. nasicola

Binomial name
- Skrjabingylus nasicola (Leuckart, 1842)

Species of roundworm

Skrjabingylus nasicola is a species of parasitic nematode in the family Metastrongylidae. Its lifecycle includes an intermediary mollusc host and a paratenic host, a shrew or small rodent. The adult worms live in the nasal sinuses of mustelids that have eaten the paratenic hosts.

== Infection ==
Hansson (1977) showed that direct transmission of the nematode from mustelid to mustelid did not occur, nor did infection occur when the mustelid was fed on small rodents, amphibians, molluscs, arthropods, or earthworms. Infection could occur when the animal was fed on the common shrew (Sorex aranea); larvae of the nematode began to be excreted by the mustelid some three weeks later. Research since then has shown that rodents can be a source of infection for mustelids.

== Lifecycle ==
Skrjabingylus nasicola has a complex lifecycle. Larvae passed in the faeces of infected mustelids are ingested by slugs such as Deroceras reticulatum. Mustelids do not usually eat molluscs, but the slugs may be eaten by a mammalian paratenic host such as Apodemus sp. or Clethrionomys glareolus. No developmental stages take place in this host and the nematode rests in the glandular zones in the head or possibly in the muscle or connective tissue. Further development takes place when this host is eaten by a mustelid and the parasite moves into its nasal tissues.
