= Metastrongylosis =

- Specialty: Infectious diseases, helminthologist

Metastrongylosis is a parasitic disease that affects wild boars and pigs which live outdoors. It is caused by various species of roundworms of the genus Metastrongylus. A handful of cases of metastrongylosis have been reported in humans.

Metastrongylus species have a life cycle which involves earthworms as an intermediate host. Pigs root for earthworms in soil, and ingest the Metastrongylus larvae which are infesting the earthworms. The larvae migrate to the lungs, and cause the pig to cough and have difficulty breathing.
