= Metastrongylus =

Scientific classification
- Kingdom: Animalia
- Phylum: Nematoda
- Class: Chromadorea
- Order: Rhabditida
- Family: Metastrongylidae
- Genus: Metastrongylus; Molin, 1861

Species
- M. elongatus (Dujardin, 1845) syn. M. apri M. pudentodectus (Wostokow, 1905); M. salmi (Gedoelst, 1823); M. confusus (Jansen, 1964); M. asymmetricus (Noda, 1973)

Genus of roundworms

Metastrongylus is a genus of nematodes of the family Metastrongylidae, usually found as lungworms in pigs and sometimes causing parasitic bronchitis. It causes a disease called metastrongylosis.

== Species ==
- Metastrongylus elongatus (Dujardin, 1845) synonym Metastrongylus apri (Gmelin, 1780)
- Metastrongylus pudendotectus (Wostokow, 1905)
- Metastrongylus salmi (Gedoelst, 1823)
- Metastrongylus confusus (Jansen, 1964)
- Metastrongylus asymmetricus (Noda, 1973)

== Life cycle ==
The lifecycle is indirect. The eggs are laid by the adult worm in the bronchi. They are coughed up, swallowed, and passed out via the feces. The eggs are then eaten by earthworms in which they develop through three larval stages over 10 days to become infective. The cycle is completed by the pig eating the earthworm. Infection, therefore, only occurs where pigs have access to earthworms, for example, in outdoor production. The larvae from the earthworm penetrate the intestine and migrate via the lymph nodes and blood vessels to the lungs, undergoing two more larval stages in the process. The prepatent period is 3-4 weeks.
