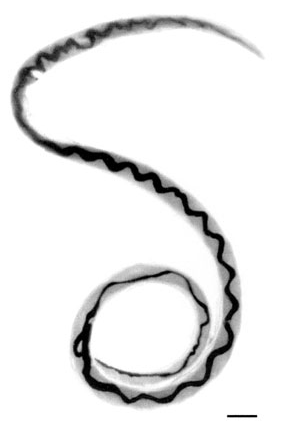

Scientific classification
- Kingdom: Animalia
- Phylum: Nematoda
- Class: Chromadorea
- Order: Rhabditida
- Suborder: Strongylida
- Superfamily: Metastrongyloidea
- Family: Metastrongylidae; Diesing, 1851

Genera
- Metastrongylus; Skrjabingylus

= Metastrongylidae =

Family of roundworms

The Metastrongylidae are a family of nematodes.

Genera in the family Metastrongylidae include:

- Aelurostrongylus
- Gurltia
- Metastrongylus
- Skrjabingylus
