= Port of Labuan Bajo =

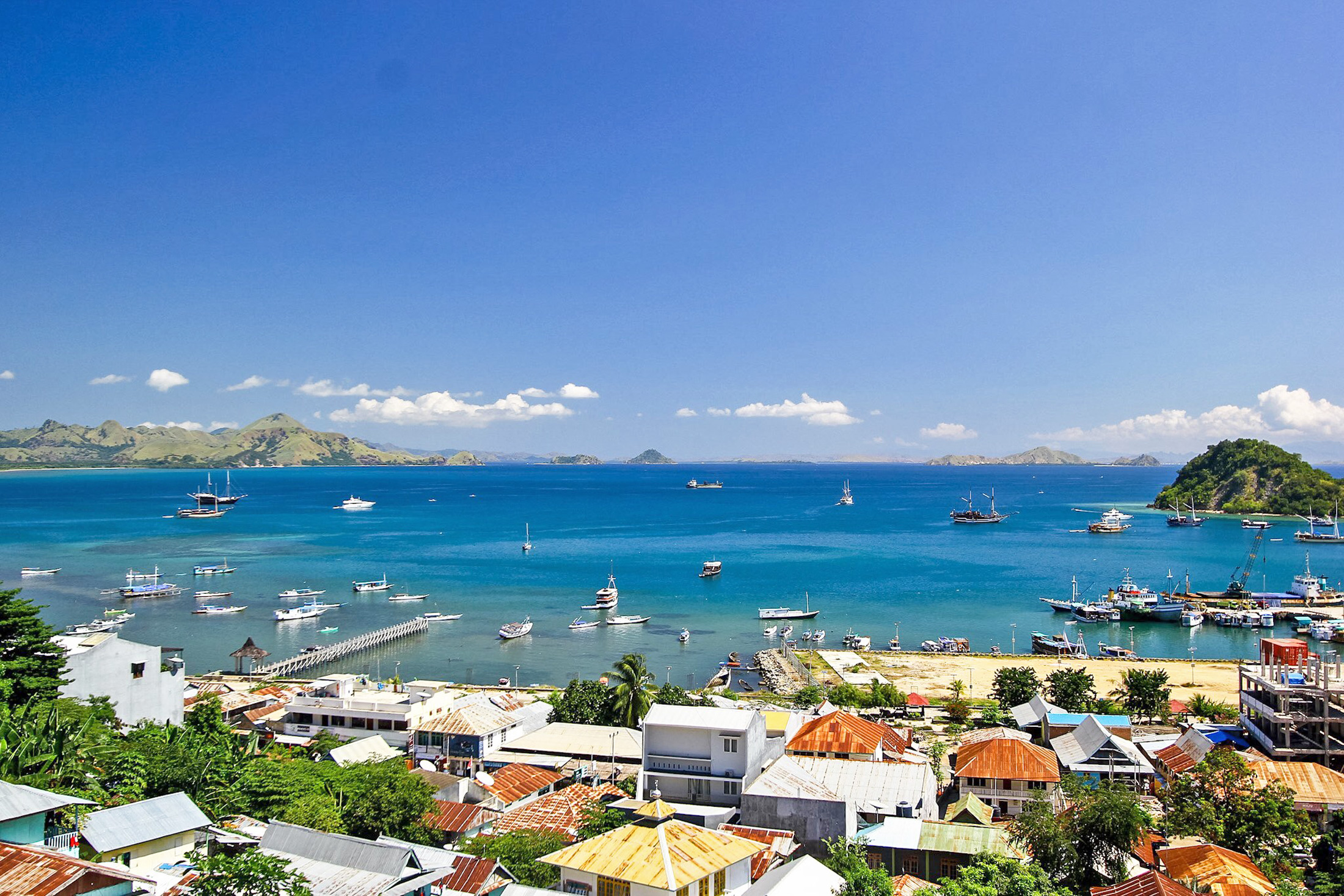
- Aerial view
- Interactive map of Port of Labuan Bajo

Location
- Country: Indonesia
- Location: East Nusa Tenggara
- Coordinates: 8.4939295°S 119.8666388°E
- UN/LOCODE: IDLBO

Details
- Owned by: PT Pelabuhan Indonesia

Statistics
- Website labuanbajoflores.id/boplbf

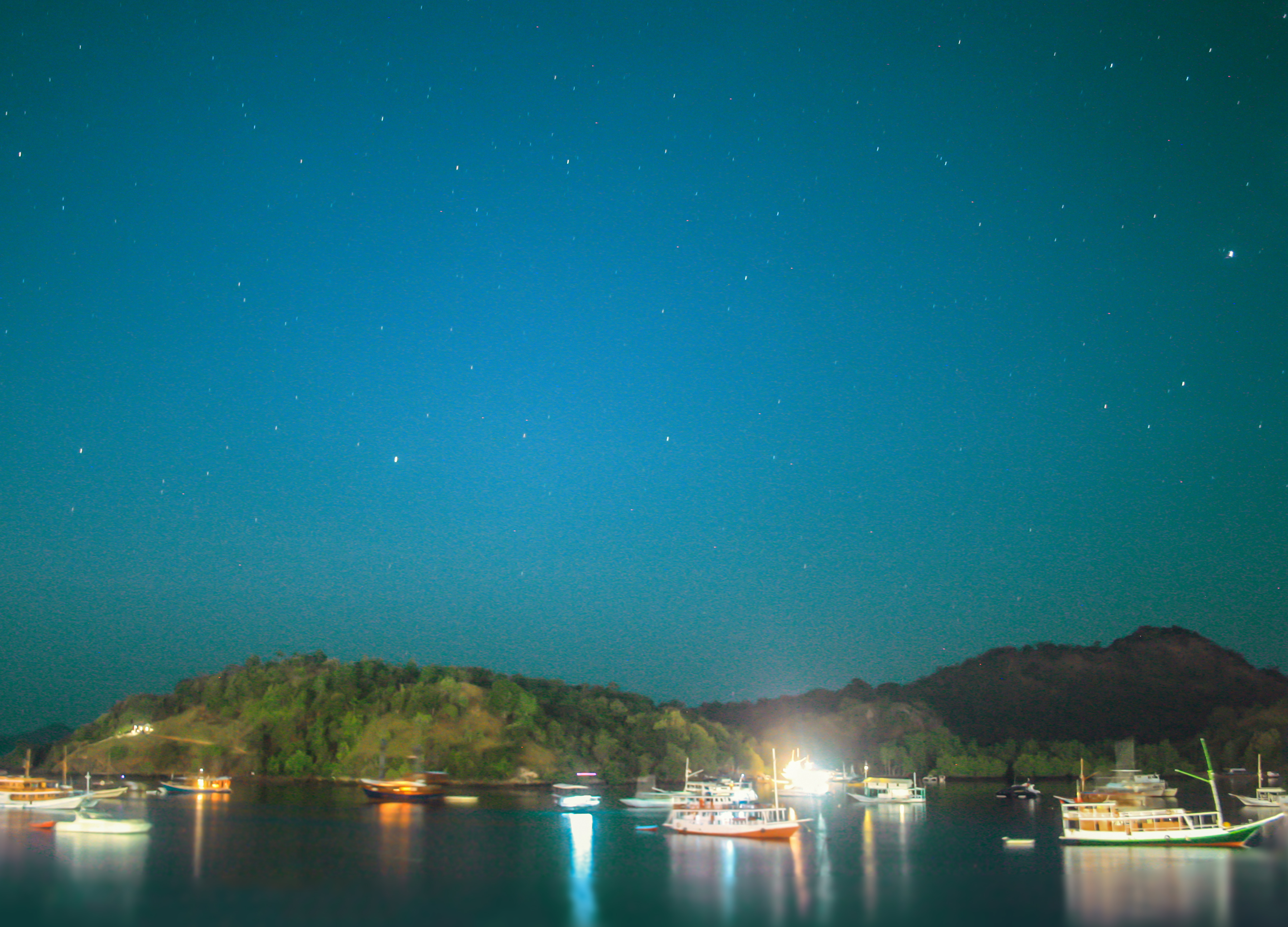
Port of Labuan Bajo

The Port of Labuan Bajo is a small port on southeastern Indonesia near the island of endangered Komodo dragon. Located on Labuan Bajo town, the western tip of Flores Island, it serves as the main departure point for trips to Komodo National Park, famous for its dragons and tropical islands. The harbor is often filled with wooden phinisi boats, speedboats, and fishing vessels, creating a natural maritime scene. As tourism grows, the port area has seen rapid development, with improved facilities and nearby cafes, hotels, and tour offices. Despite modernization, it still retains a panoramic view, especially during sunset over the Flores Sea.

== Phinisi Vessel Accident ==
On Friday, 26 December 2025, the phinisi vessel Putri Sakinah sank in the Padar Strait, reportedly after encountering waves of up to two meters that led to engine failure. Two passengers and five crew members were rescued safely, while four Spanish nationals remain missing and are believed to have been trapped inside the cabin. The missing include Fernando Martín Carreras, a women's football coach for Valencia CF, along with his three children.

== Development ==
Labuan Bajo is currently emerging as a prominent tourism destination in Indonesia and has been described by local residents as undergoing rapid transformation. The vernacular architectural traditions of the Bajo, Bugis, and Manggarai communities may appear distinct from those of other traditional building cultures, yet they share similarities in terms of construction materials and building scale. Their settlement patterns and building orientations, however, vary considerably, particularly in the use of ornaments and the forms of their roofs.

== See also ==
- List of Indonesian ports
- Ministry of Transportation, Indonesia
- Transport in Indonesia
- Tanjung Priok
- Komodo National Park
- Komodo International Airport
