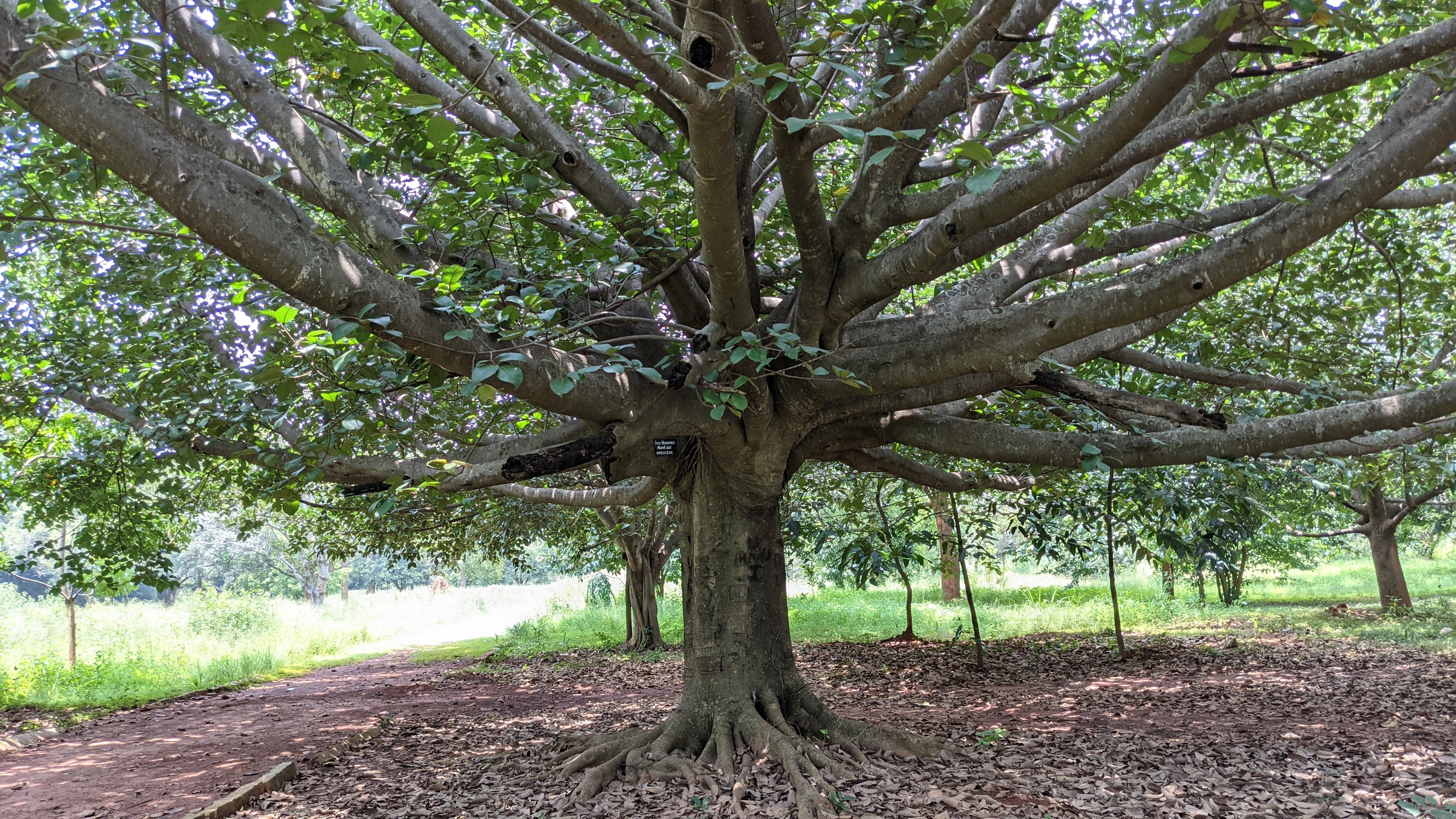

Scientific classification
- Kingdom: Plantae
- Clade: Tracheophytes
- Clade: Angiosperms
- Clade: Eudicots
- Clade: Rosids
- Order: Rosales
- Family: Moraceae
- Genus: Ficus
- Species: F. drupacea
- Variety: F. d. var. pubescens

Trinomial name
- Ficus drupacea var. pubescens (Roemer & Schultes) Corner

Synonyms
- Ficus citrifolia Willd.; Ficus gonia Buch.-Ham.; Ficus mysorensis Roth; Ficus mysorensis var. pubescens Roth; Urostigma dasycarpum Miq.; Urostigma mysorense Miq.

= Ficus drupacea var. pubescens =

Variety of flowering plant

Ficus drupacea var. pubescens, also known as the Mysore fig (named for Mysore, India) or brown woolly fig, is a variety of F. drupacea distinguished by its fruits and leaves having a dense yellow-brown pubescence. It is naturally distributed throughout Southeast Asia, and has been introduced elsewhere. It forms a distinct shape with large, buttressing roots. Its leaves are characterized by a distinctly pointed tip, and it is pollinated by small wasps.

It has been introduced and popularly recognized for its size and form in various locations, including in Florida, its root systems reaching 30 feet (9.1 m) or more in diameter. However, the shallow base of the roots (~12 inches (300 mm)) has led to susceptibility during hurricanes. Well-known individuals are or were located on the Edison and Ford Winter Estates in Fort Myers, Florida (uprooted by Hurricane Irma in 2017), 80 feet (24 m) tall and 30 feet (9.1 m) wide, and Estero, Florida. The latter is currently living and is the largest individual in Florida (Florida State Champion), planted in 1896 from Mysore, India, standing at 95 feet (29 m), with a 133 foot (41 m) crown spread and 40 foot (12 m) circumference.
