= Kokotuku Peninsula =

Kokotuku Peninsula, West Flores, East Nusa Tenggara, Indonesia
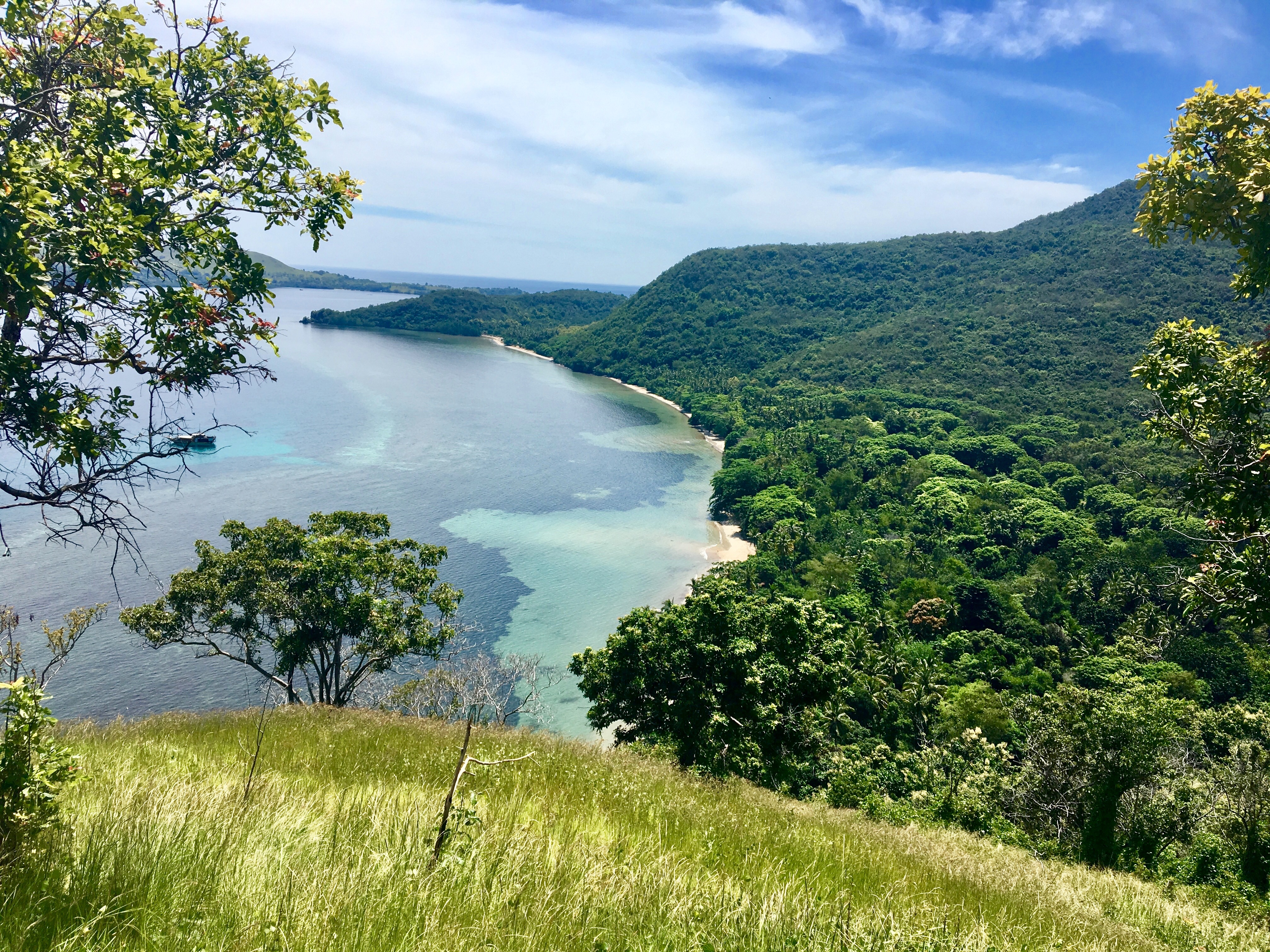
- Dongalan Beach on Kokotuku Peninsula

Ecology
- Realm: Southeast Asia
- Biome: Tropical Rainforest
- Bird species: Paradise-flycatcher, kingfisher, cuckoo, cockatoo, megapode, drongo
- Mammal species: long-tailed macaque, flying fox (fruit bat), barking deer, wild buffalo, wild boar, dugong

Geography
- Country: Indonesia
- State: East Nusa Tenggara
- Coordinates: 8°23'40.69"S, 120°01'05.35"E
- Geology: Metamorphic
- Climate type: Tropical

The Kokotuku Peninsula is a 986 hectare tropical land mass located 20 kilometers north of the city of Labuan Bajo, West Manggarai, Flores NTT, Indonesia. The West Flores-Komodo region is a UNESCO World Heritage Site, and is considered one of the Seven Wonders of the Natural World.

The Kokotuku Peninsula features a natural harbor, a mountain of 300 meters elevation, and 15 kilometer-long coastline of coral reefs, white sand beaches, and mangrove forests. Kokotuku's reefs are home to a wide variety of tropical fish. The peninsula's rocky inland supports several indigenous species, including monitor lizards, monkeys, flying foxes, and many parrot species.

== Flora and fauna ==
While the region's most famous attraction, the Komodo dragon, is found only on the nearby Komodo-Rinca Islands, fauna on Kokotuku include the long-tailed macaque, giant iguana, flying fox (fruit bat), barking deer, wild buffalo, and wild boar.

Indigenous lowland birds include the paradise flycatcher, kingfisher, cuckoo, cockatoo, megapode, and drongo, among many others. There are several species of butterfly.

Extensive coral reefs support a wide variety of sealife, including sea turtles, manta rays, barracuda, angel fish, parrot fish, lion fish, clown fish, and starfish of many hues. Coastal mangroves provide a breeding area for dugong.

== Tourism ==
Home to Komodo National Park, West Flores is perhaps the most popular destination in the Indonesian Archipelago for marine and adventure tourists. Surrounded by turquoise waters, Kokotuku offers numerous sailing, snorkeling, and diving experiences. Trekking, mountain biking, cultural immersion and backwater trips are also plentiful.

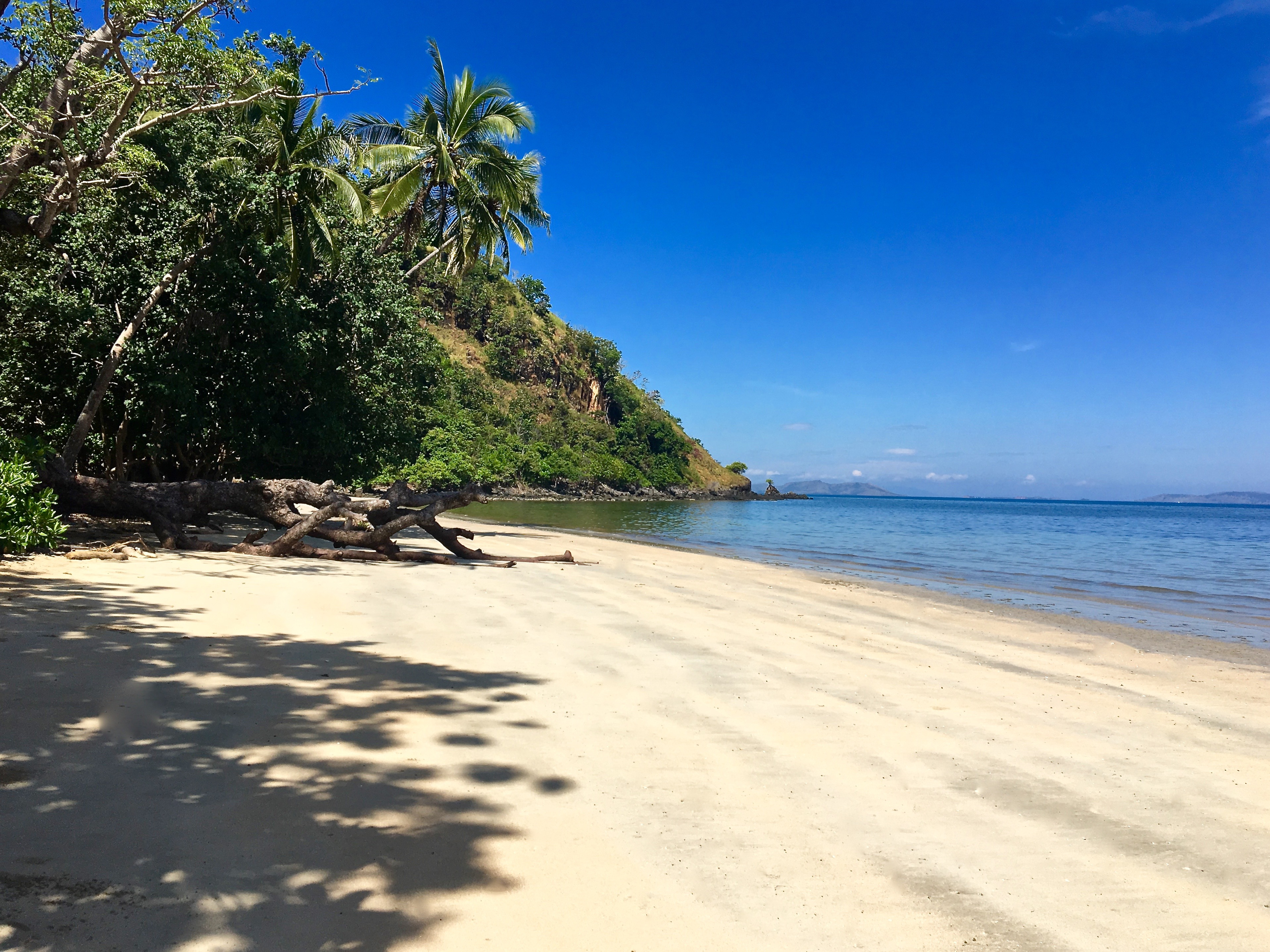
Dongalong Beach, Kokotuku

== Kokotuku Sanctuary Consortium ==
In 2015 the Kokotuku Sanctuary Consortium (KSC) was formed to preserve the area's unique environment and wildlife through responsible stewardship of the land and seas. Working in cooperation with the Planning Board of the Government of Flores, the KSC established firm guidelines to promote sustainable local development, zoning, and building styles for Kokotuku's inland, coastline, islands and sea.

The KSC has worked together with local and federal government to draft development and activity guidelines that will become Indonesian law, in an effort to protect the area's natural environment. The KSC Board of Governors is composed of both regional and global marine tourism leaders whose experience continues to guide development in the area, while facilitating access to government assistance for residents and small business owners.

== Sustainable development ==
Working in cooperation with the Planning Board of the Government of Flores, the KSC has established firm guidelines for sustainable local development, creating a Conservation and Development Masterplan for the Kokotuku Peninsula which includes its inland, coastline, islands and surrounding sea. The KSC Masterplan designates forest preserves, protection and restoration areas, no-boat zones, as well as plastic-free and noise-free zones.

It is hoped that by taking preemptive action, environmental degradation to the Kokotuku region may be averted. Many touristic areas in Southeast Asia have experienced catastrophic economic consequences due to poor planning and insufficient infrastructure. Recent examples include Bali, Bandung, and Boracay, Philippines.

== Transportation ==
Kokotuku Peninsula is currently accessible by boat from the Port of Labuan Bajo. The port is also the launching point for trips to Komodo Island, local diving and snorkeling sites, secluded beaches, and inter-island cruises. The government has announced the construction of a new marina and supporting facilities, slated for completion in 2019, to accommodate international cruise ships.

A national road will connect Kokotuku with the town of Labuan Bajo. Road construction is underway and is on schedule to be completed by the end of 2019.

The new Komodo Airport opened in December 2015. Its expanded runway can now accommodate medium class passenger jets, while its large terminal can serve up to 1.5 million travelers per year. The airport will begin receiving international flights in 2019.

== Islands ==
Medang is a small, low-lying island, home to Medang Village. Sebabi Island, located due north of Kokotuku Peninsula, is much larger and higher in elevation.

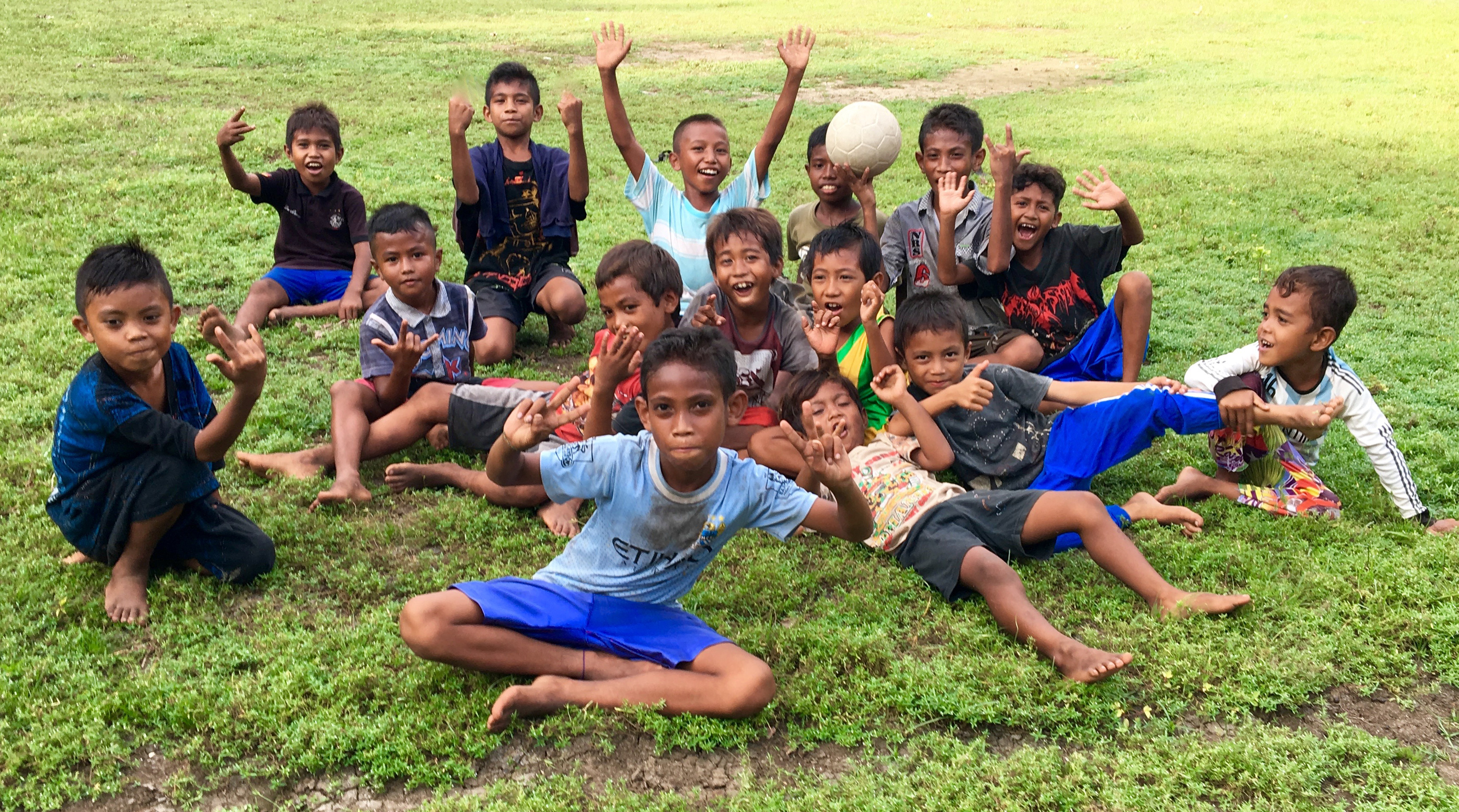
Young Football Players in Pasir Panjang village, Kokotuku Peninsula

== Villages ==
The Kokotuku Peninsula has three traditional villages—Pontiana, Medang, and Pasir Panjang. These colorful villages are made up of traditional Bugis stilt houses and small shops. Villagers' main source of income is derived from selling fresh and dried fish.

Pontiana village is the largest of the three villages, with a population of about 200. Pontiana is the regional arrival point for boats from Labuan Bajo, as well as the Sebabi ferry. Pontiana is connected to Labuan Bajo via the nearby hillside national road.

Pasir Panjang (Long Sand) is another of the three villages, and has a white sand beach and coconut palms. The village consists of 50 family homes set around a natural clearing which the village children use as a football (soccer) soccer field.

Medang Village is located on the southern side of Medang Island, to the east of the Kokotuku Peninsula. It is home to 70 families who subsist from selling salted fish.

== Kokotuku Nature Reserve ==
The Kokotuku Nature Reserve is a planned mixed-use nature conservation and recreation area to be located on and around the Kokotuku Peninsula. The Reserve is an approved component of the RTBL (Rencana Tata Bangunan dan Lingkungan) Spatial Plan and will be managed by the Kokotuku Sanctuary Consortium (KSC) in cooperation with the West Manggarai Regency. Under the plan, certain areas are designated solely for reforestation and restoration of indigenous species, while other areas are approved for the construction of sustainable accommodations [see map]. A nature path will connect various scenic vistas and sites of interest within the reserve.

== Kokotuku Marine Protected Area ==
The Kokotuku Sanctuary Consortium (KSC) has proposed creating a Marine Protected Area in order to protect endangered marine life and reduce pollution. The KSC proposal includes a Coral and Fish Restoration Zone. The plan seeks to end the use of anchors in the area, and would provide boat mooring places to facilitate this goal. The Kokotuku Marine Protected Area would encompass the four main areas of the Kokotuku region. [Map]

== See also ==
- Komodo
