= Komodo National Park =

National park in Indonesia

- Taman Nasional Komodo
- IUCN category II (national park)
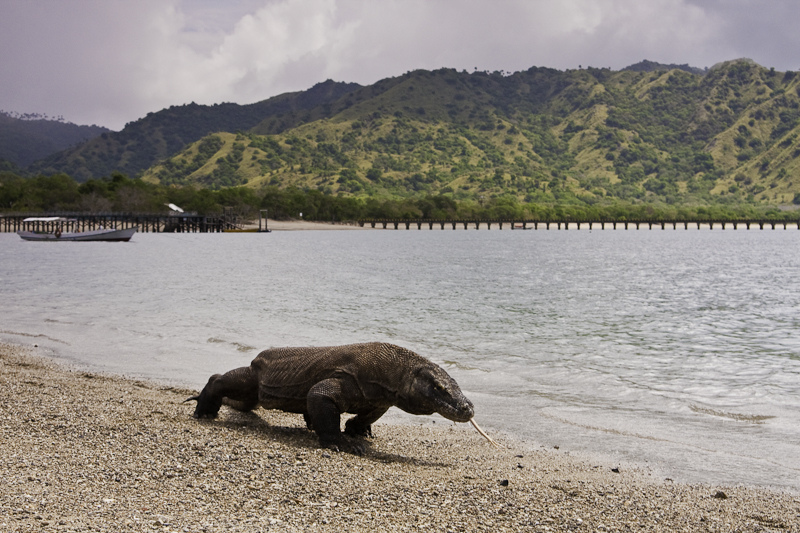
- Komodo dragon at Komodo National Park

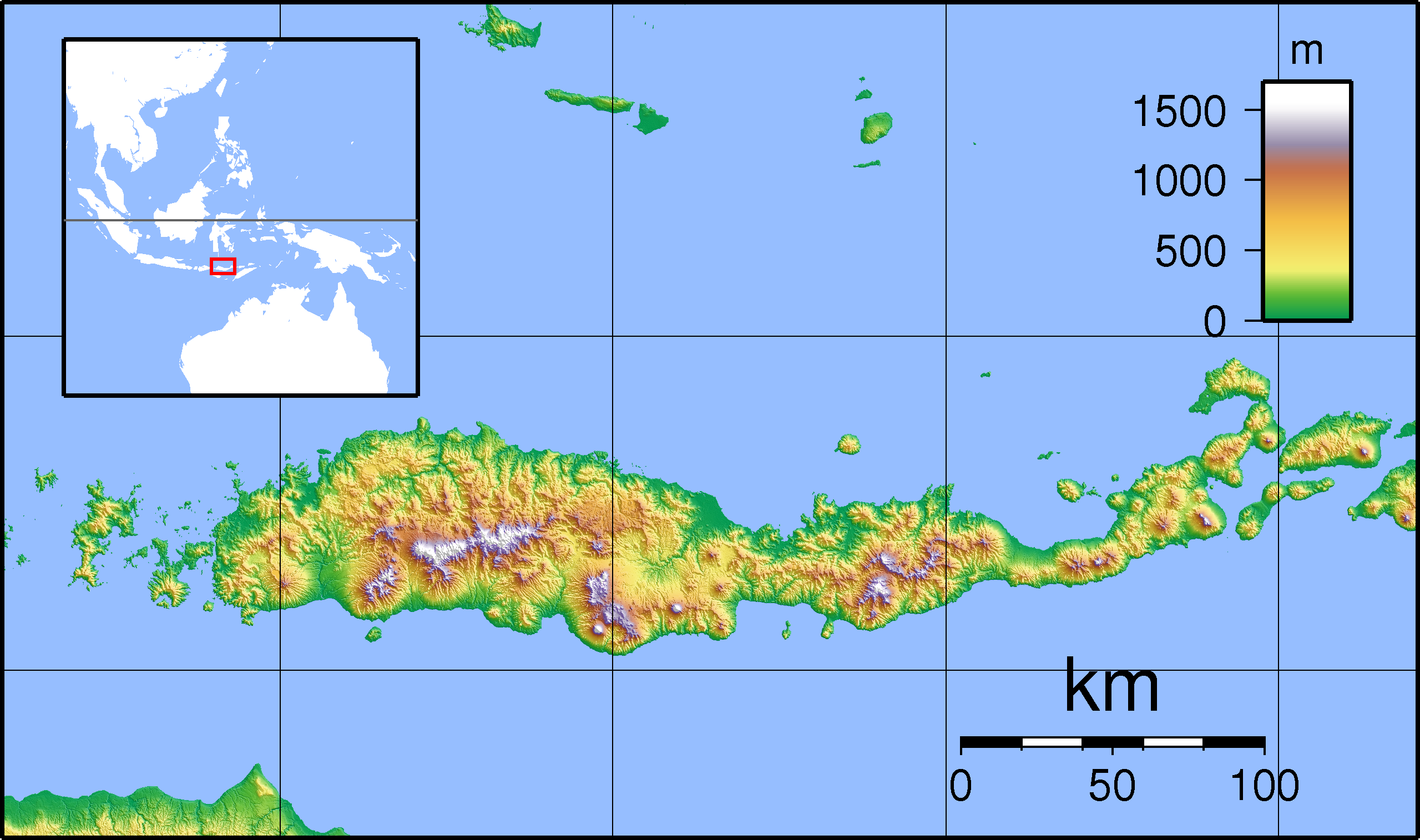
- Location within Flores
- Location: Lesser Sunda Islands, Indonesia
- Coordinates: 8°32′36″S 119°29′22″E
- Area: 1,733 km^{2} (669 sq mi)
- Established: 1980
- Visitors: 45,000 (in 2010)
- Governing body: Ministry of Environment and Forestry
- Website: www.komodonationalpark.org

UNESCO World Heritage Site
- Criteria: Natural: vii, x
- Reference: 609
- Inscription: 1991 (15th Session)

Komodo National Park (Indonesian: Taman Nasional Komodo) is a national park in Indonesia within the Lesser Sunda Islands in the border region between the provinces of East Nusa Tenggara and West Nusa Tenggara. The park includes the three larger islands—Komodo, Padar and Rinca—and 26 smaller ones, with a total area of 1,733 km^{2} (669 sq mi), with 603 km^{2} (233 sq mi) of it land. The park was founded in 1980 to protect the Komodo dragon, the world's largest lizard. Later it was dedicated to protecting other species, including marine species. In 1991 the park was declared a UNESCO World Heritage Site and a Man and Biosphere Reserve. It is considered one of the world's 25 biodiversity hotspots.

Komodo National Park has been selected as one of the New 7 Wonders of Nature. The waters surrounding Komodo island contain rich marine biodiversity. Komodo island is also part of the Coral Triangle, which contains some of the richest marine biodiversity on Earth.

It is also a WWF Global 200 Marine Eco-region, a WWF/IUCN Centre of Plant Diversity, one of the world's Endemic Bird Areas and an ASEAN Heritage Park.

== History ==
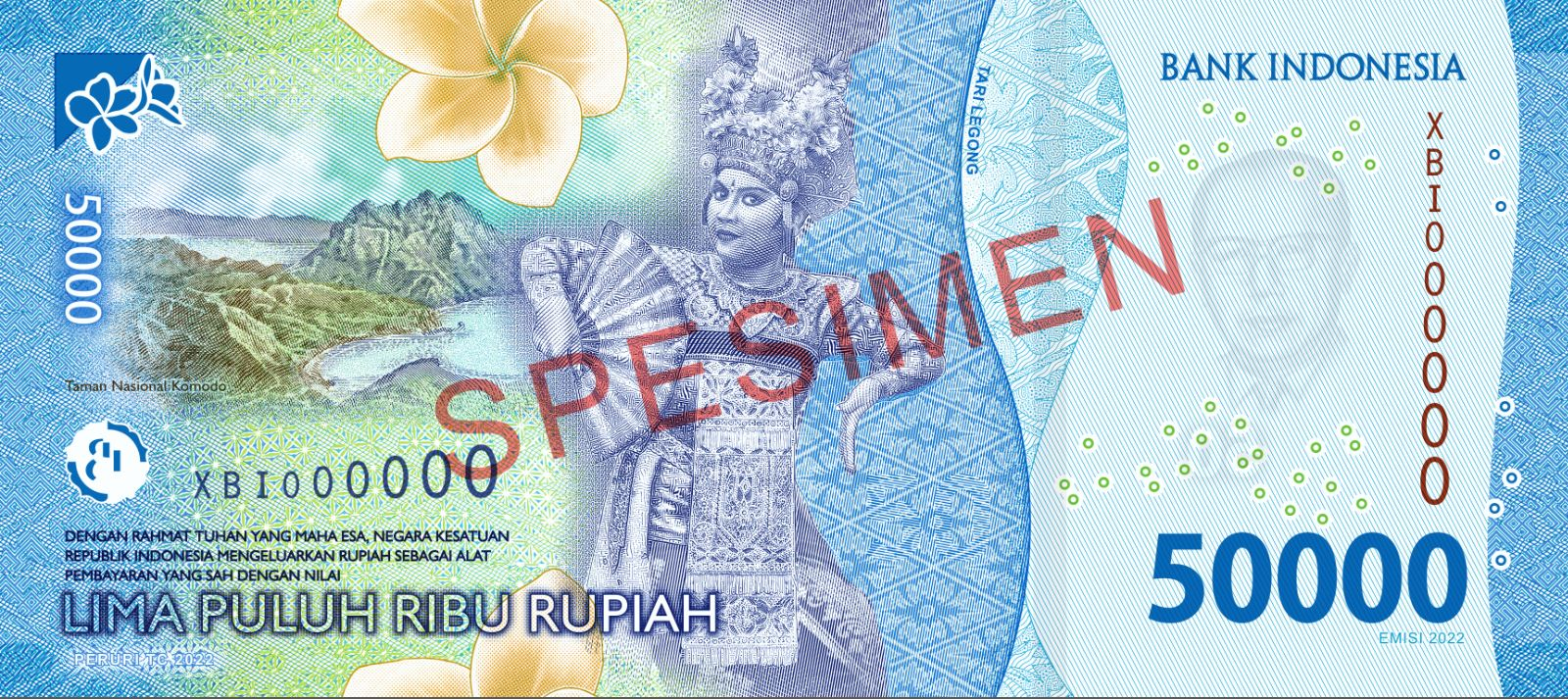
Komodo National Park featured on the reverse of the 50,000 rupiah banknote

The island of Padar and part of Rinca were established as nature reserves in 1938.

Komodo Island was declared a nature reserve in 1965, and in January 1977 as a biosphere reserve under the UNESCO Man and Biosphere Reserve Programme.

In 1980 the islands of Komodo, Padar, Rinca and Gili Motong and the surrounding waters were declared a national park, for a total of 75,000 ha (190,000 acres; 750 km^{2}).

In 1984 the national park was extended to 219,322 ha (541,960 acres) in order to include the marine area Mbeliling / Ngorang (31,000 ha or 77,000 acres), and Wae Wuul / Mburak Recreation Parks (3,000 ha or 7,400 acres) on mainland Flores. The marine zone covers 60% of the national park area.

In 1991 the national park was declared a UNESCO World Heritage Site.

In 2005 it was designated an ASEAN Heritage Park.

The park was initially established to conserve the unique Komodo dragon (Varanus komodoensis), first discovered by the scientific world in 1912 through Lieutenant J. K. H. van Steyn van Hensbroek, the Civil Administrator in Reo, Flores Island. Since then conservation goals have expanded to protecting the entire biodiversity of the region, both marine and terrestrial.

It is considered one of the world's 25 biodiversity hotspots - a Conservation International designation. It is also one of the WWF Global 200 Marine Eco-regions, a UNESCO Man and Biosphere Reserve, a WWF/IUCN Centre of Plant Diversity and one of the world's Endemic Bird Areas.

== Geography and climate ==
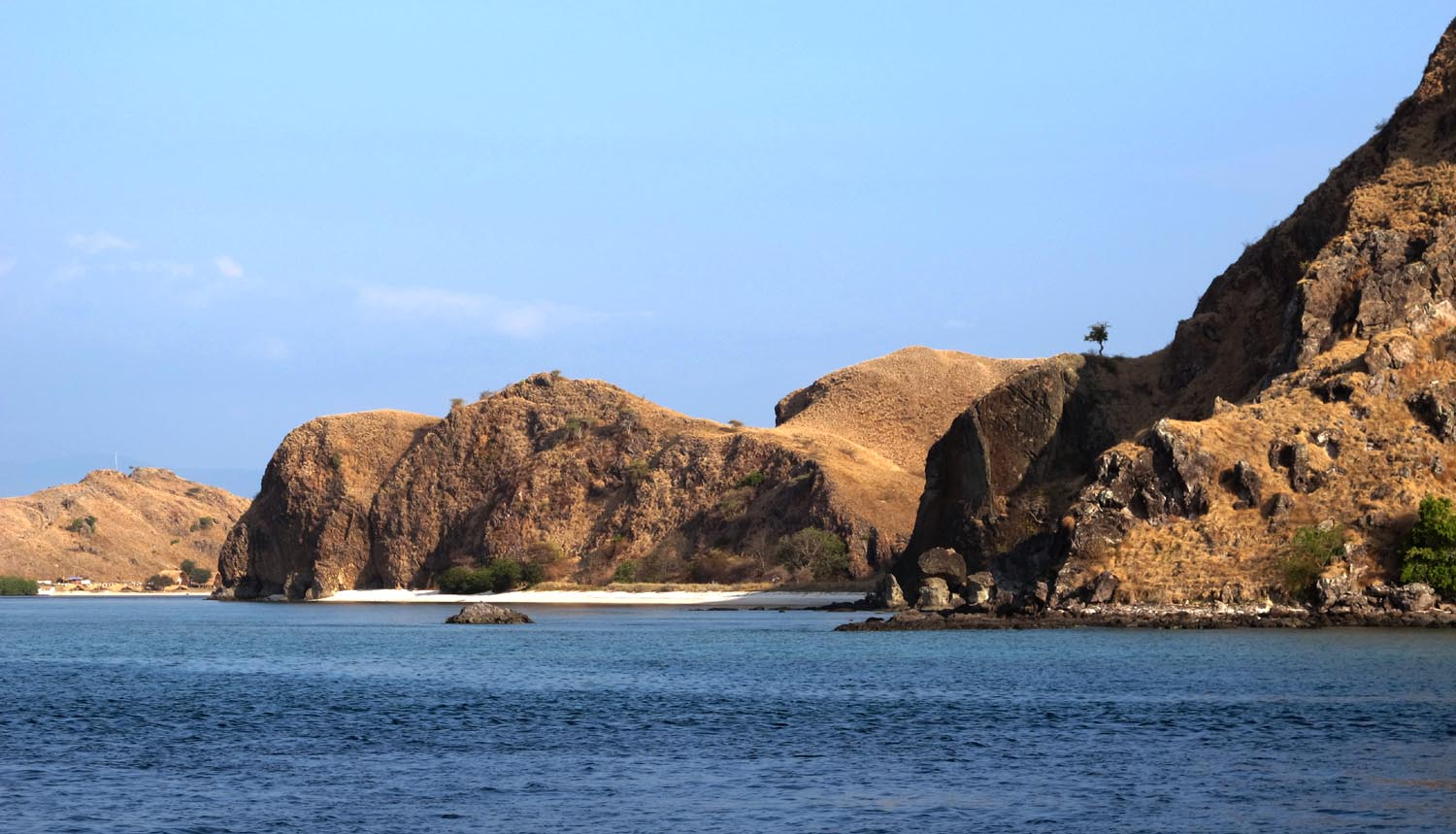
The rugged terrain of Komodo Island with few trees makes it one of the driest locations in Indonesia.

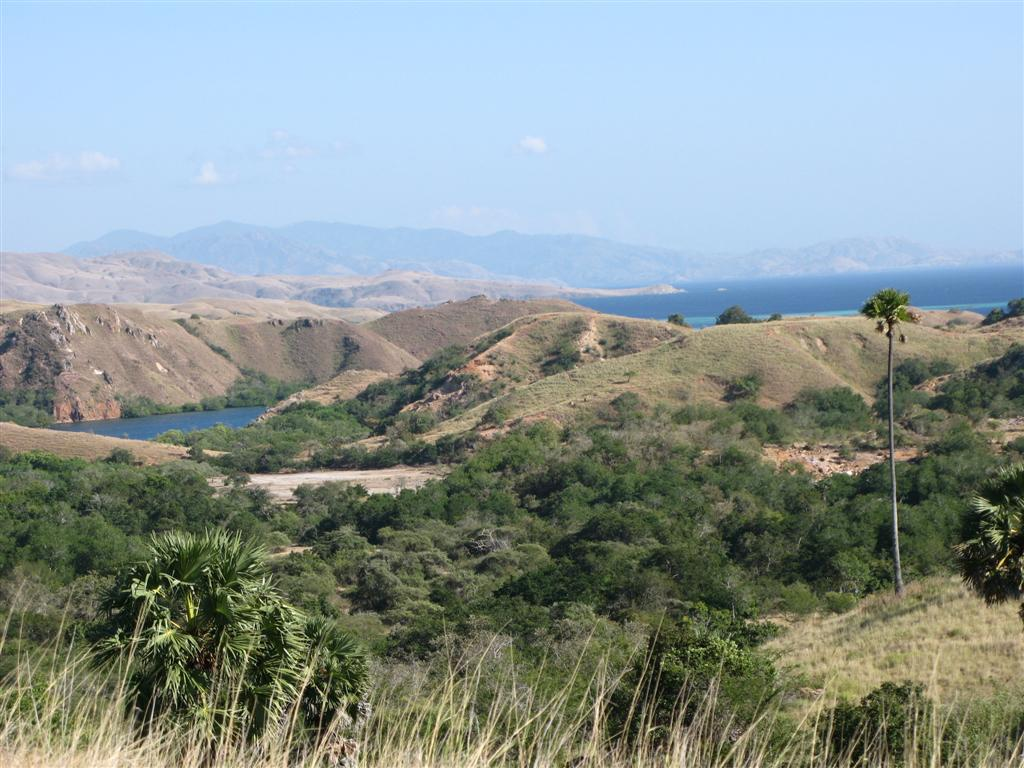
Rinca Island

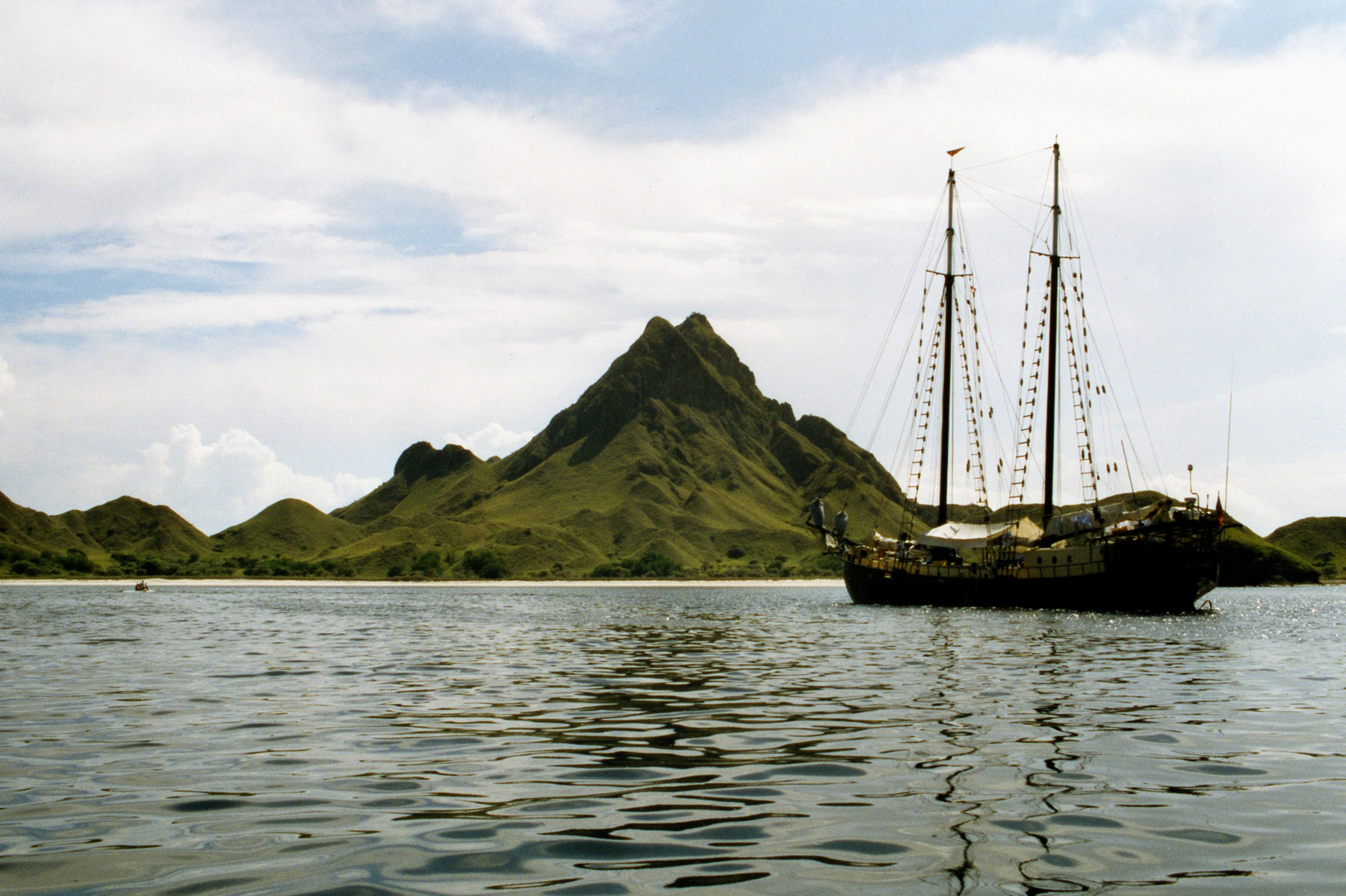
Padar Island

The park comprises a coastal section of western Flores, the three larger islands of Komodo, Padar and Rinca, 26 smaller islands and the surrounding waters of the Sape Straights. The islands of the national park are of volcanic origin. The terrain is generally rugged, characterized by rounded hills, with altitudes up to 735 m (2,411 ft). The climate is one of the driest of Indonesia with annual rainfall of 800 to 1,000 mm (31 to 39 in). Temperatures in the dry season from May to October are around 40 °C (104 °F).

== Human settlements ==
=== Population history ===
Little is known of the early history of the Komodo islanders. They were subjects of the Sultanate of Bima, although the island's remoteness from Bima meant its affairs were probably little troubled by the Sultanate other than by occasional demands for tribute.

The majority of the people in and around the park are fishermen, originally from Bima (Sumbawa), Manggarai, South Flores, and South Sulawesi. Those from South Sulawesi are from the Sama-Bajau or Bugis ethnic groups. The Sama-Bajau were originally nomadic and moved from location to location in the region of Sulawesi, Nusa Tenggara and Maluku, to make a living. Descendants of the original people of Komodo, the Ata Modo, still live in Komodo, but there are no full-blooded Ata Modo left, and their culture and language is slowly being integrated with the recent migrants.

The human population within the park spread out over four settlements (Komodo, Rinca, Kerora, and Papagaran), all of which existed before 1980 when the area was declared a national park. In 1928 there were only 30 people living in Komodo Village (known locally as Kampung Komodo), and approximately 250 people on Rinca Island in 1930. The population increased rapidly, and by 1999, there were 281 families numbering 1,169 people on Komodo Island. Komodo Village has had the highest population within the park, mostly due to migration by people from Sape, Manggarai, Madura, and South Sulawesi. The number of buildings in Komodo Village has increased rapidly from 30 houses in 1958, to 194 houses in 1994, and 270 houses in 2000. Papagaran Village is similar in size, with 258 families totaling 1,078 people. At the 2010 Census, Komodo Village had 1,508 inhabitants and Papagaran Village had 1,262 inhabitants. As of 1999, Rinca's population was 835, and Kerora's population was 185 people.PKA & TNC 2000, p. 13

In 2004, the total population living in the park was 3,267, while 16,816 people lived in the area immediately surrounding the park.

=== Economy ===
As of 2007, 97% of the people living within the park rely on marine resources as their only source of income. They are pauperised by the restrictions on access to resources coupled with rising costs of living, a growing population and the lack of sustainable livelihood alternatives, all of which increasing the pressure on resources.

Tourism revenue and local communities

Locally, tourism has become a major industry since the late 1980s and the 1990s; but this development brought little benefit to the local communities within the park. Not only this industry is mainly based outside the park in Labuan Bajo; moreover most of the benefits thusly generated are leaked outside the region to large national or international tourism operators.

=== Education ===
The average level of education in the villages of Komodo National Park is grade four of elementary school. There is an elementary school located in each of the villages but new students are not admitted each year. On average, each village has four classes and four teachers. Most of the children from the small islands in the Kecamatan Komodo (Komodo, Rinca, Kerora, Papagaran, Mesa) do not finish elementary school. Less than 10% of those who do graduate from elementary school continue to high school since the major economic opportunity (fishing) does not require further education. Children must be sent to Labuan Bajo to attend high school, but this is rarely done in fishermen's families.

=== Health ===
Most of the villages located in and around the park have few fresh water facilities available, if any, particularly during the dry season. Water quality declines during this time period and many people become ill. Businesses also take up large amounts of water for tourism uses, often getting a lower per-unit cost than locals. Malaria and diarrhea are rampant in the area. On Messah island, with a population of 1,969 people, there is no fresh water available. Fresh water has to be brought in jerrycans by boat from the mainland. The cost for each family for fresh water is Rp100,000 per month. Almost every village has a local medical facility with staff, and at least a paramedic. The quality of medical care facilities is low.

=== Socio-cultural and anthropologic conditions ===
Traditional communities in Komodo, Flores and Sumbawa have been subjected to outside influences and the influence of traditional customs is dwindling. Television, radio, and increased mobility have all played a part in accelerating the rate of change. There has been a steady influx of migrants into the area. At the moment nearly all villages consist of more than one ethnic group.

=== Religion ===
The Manggarai are mostly Christians. The majority of fishermen living in the villages in the vicinity of the park are Muslims. Hajis have a strong influence in the dynamics of community development. Fishermen hailing from South Sulawesi (Bajau, Bugis) and Bima are mostly Muslims.

=== Anthropology and language ===
There are several cultural sites within the park, particularly on Komodo Island. These sites are not well documented, however, and there are many questions concerning the history of human inhabitance on the island. Outside the park, in Warloka village on Flores, there is a Chinese trading post remnant of some interest. Archeological finds from this site have been looted in the recent past. Most communities in and around the park can speak Indonesian. Bajo language is the language used for daily communication in most communities.

== Flora and fauna ==
The hot and dry climate of the park, characterized by savannah vegetation, makes it a good habitat for the endemic Komodo dragon (Varanus komodoensis). Their populations are restricted to the islands of Komodo (1,700), Rinca (1,300), Gili Motang (100), Gili Dasami (100), and Flores (c. 2,000), while extinct on Padar.

The park also has areas of rainforest, deciduous forest and mangroves. The parks's savannah vegetation features lontar palm (Borassus flabellifer) and grass species including Chloris barbata, Heteropogon contortus and Themeda triandra. Deciduous forests feature species including Cassia javanica, Diospyros javanica, Harrisonia brownii, Murraya paniculata, Oroxylum indicum, Piliostigma malabaricum, Schleichera oleosa, Sterculia foetida and Tamarindus indica.

Cloud forests appear only in few areas above 500 metres but they provide habitat to species, some endemic, including Ficus drupacea, Glycosmis pentaphylla, Podocarpus neriifolius, Terminalia zollingeri and Uvaria rufa. Coastal vegetation includes mangrove forest, which generally appear in the sheltered bays of the three larger islands. Mangrove species include Avicennia marina, Bruguiera gymnorhiza, Rhizophora stylosa and red mangrove (Rhizophora mangle).

Fringing and patch coral reefs are extensive and best developed on the north-east coast of Komodo. The park is rich in marine life, including whale sharks, ocean sunfish, manta rays, eagle rays, pygmy seahorse, false pipefish, clown frogfish, nudibranchs, blue-ringed octopus, sponges, tunicates, and coral.

Varieties of cetaceans inhabit in adjacent waters from smaller sized dolphins to sperm whales and even blue whales. Omura's whales, one of the least known of rorquals have been confirmed to range waters within the park. Endangered dugongs still live in Komodo areas as well.

The terrestrial fauna is of rather poor diversity in comparison to the marine fauna. The number of terrestrial animal species found in the park is not high, but the area is important from a conservation perspective as some species are endemic. Many of the mammals are Asiatic in origin, including the rusa deer, wild boar, water buffalo, crab-eating macaque and civet. Several of the reptiles and birds are Australian in origin, such as the orange-footed scrubfowl, the lesser sulphur crested cockatoo, and the helmeted friarbird.

The most famous of Komodo National Park's reptiles is the Komodo dragon (Varanus komodoensis). It is the world's largest lizard and is among the world's largest reptiles; the females can reach a length of 2 to 2.5 m (6.6–8 ft) and a 70 kg weight, the males a length of 3 m (10 ft) and up to 136 kg (300 lb) weight, but the average is respectively of 68 to 73 kg (150 to 161 lb) weight for a 2.29 m (7.5 ft) length and 79 to 91 kg (174 to 201 lb) weight for a 2.59 m (8.5 ft) length.

Twelve terrestrial snake species are found on the island in addition to marine species. Snakes include the Javan spitting cobra (Naja sputatrix), eastern Russell's viper (Daboia siamensis), Lesser Sunda Islands pit viper (Trimeresurus insularis), blue lipped sea krait (Laticauda laticaudata), and Timor python (Python timoriensis). Lizards include nine skink species (Scinidae), geckos (Gekkonidae), limbless lizards (Dibamidae), and the monitor lizards such as the Komodo dragon (Varanidae). Frogs include the Asian bullfrog (Kaloula baleata), the endemic Komodo cross frog (Oreophryne jeffersoniana) and Oreophryne darewskyi. Frogs are typically found at higher, moister altitudes. The saltwater crocodile (Crocodylus porosus) was once present within the park in coastal areas including mangrove swamps but is now extinct within the area.

Mammals found within the park include the Timor rusa deer (Cervus timorensis), the main prey of the Komodo dragon, horses (Equus sp.), water buffalo (Bubalus bubalis), wild boar (Sus scrofa vittatus), crab-eating macaque (Macaca fascicularis), Asian palm civet (Paradoxurus hermaphroditus lehmanni), the endemic Rinca rat (Rattus rintjanus), and fruit bats. Domestic mammals on within the park include goats, cats and dogs which are feral.

One of the main bird species is the orange-footed scrubfowl (Megapodius reinwardti), a ground dwelling bird. In areas of savanna, 27 species were observed. The zebra dove (Geopelia striata) and spotted dove (Spilopelia chinensis) were the most common species. In mixed tropical deciduous habitat, 28 bird species were observed, and helmeted friarbird (Philemon buceroides), green imperial pigeon (Ducula aenea), and lemon-bellied white-eye (Zosterops chloris) were the most common. Other birds include vibrantly coloured species such as green junglefowl (Gallus varius), great-billed parrot (Tanygnathus megalorynchos), and the critically endangered lesser sulpher crested cockatoo (Cacatua sulphurea). Two eagle species are found in the park, the white-bellied sea eagle and the extremely rare Flores hawk-eagle which is present on Rinca and Flores and reported but unconfirmed on Komodo Island.

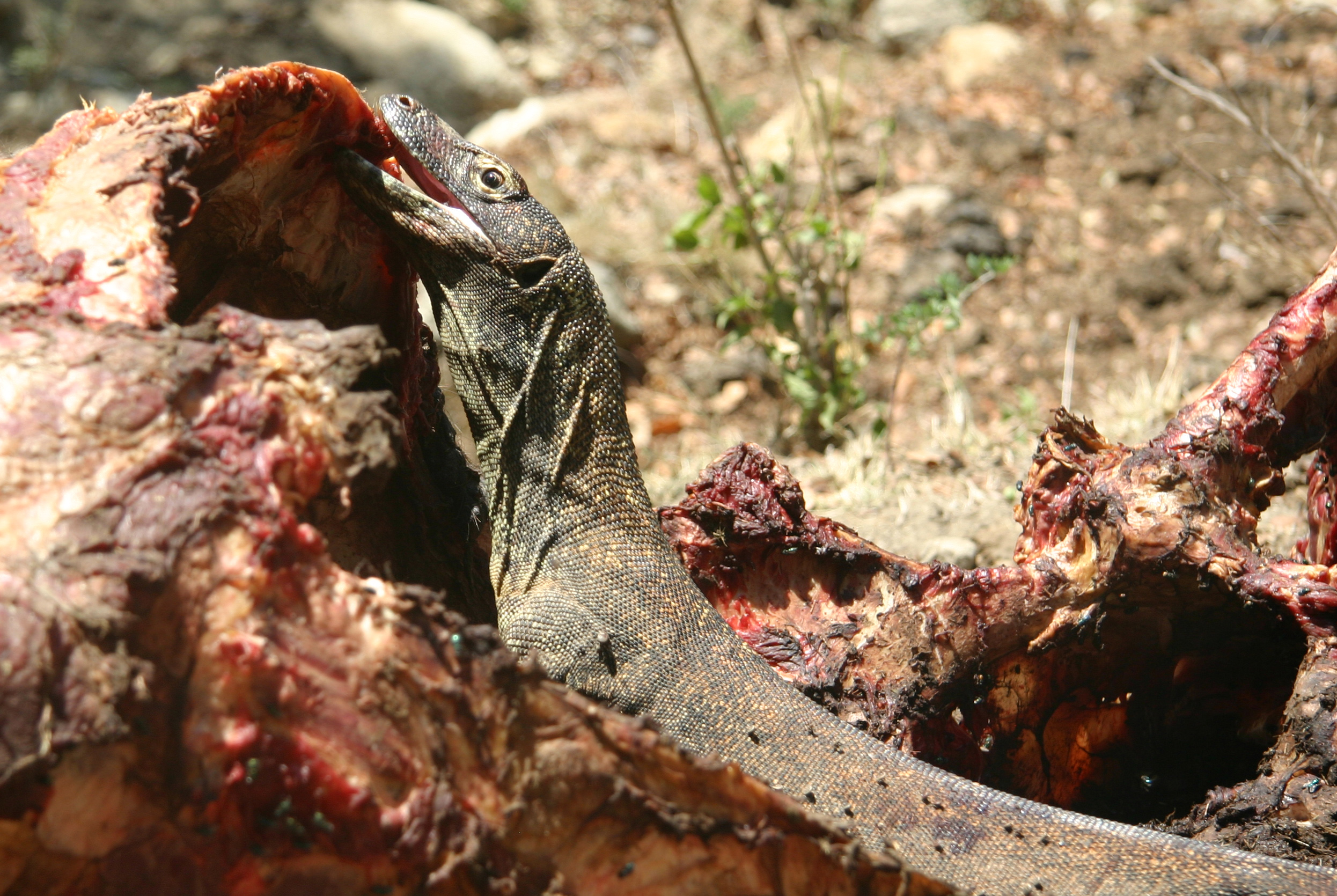
Komodo dragon feeding on a carcass

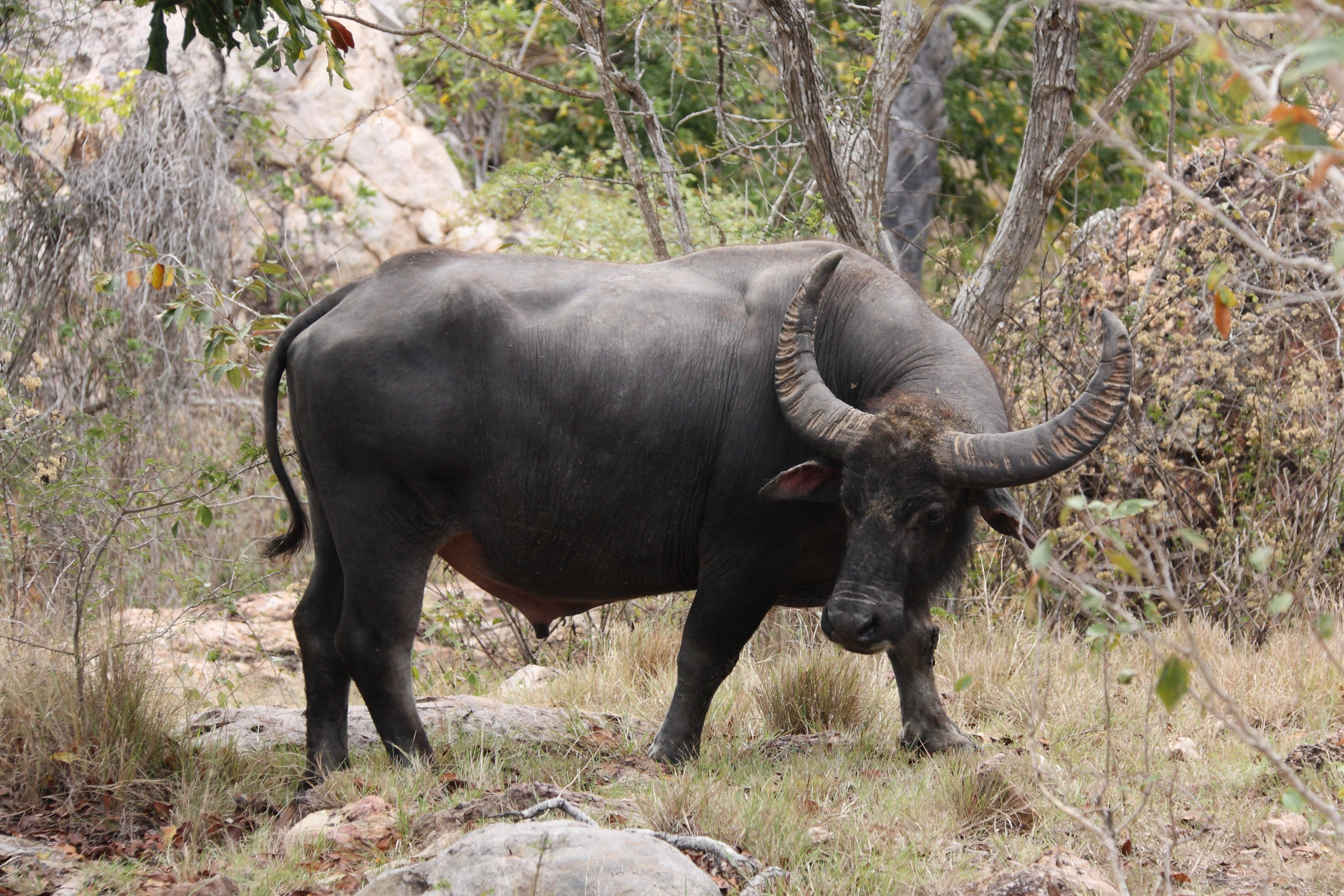
Water buffalo

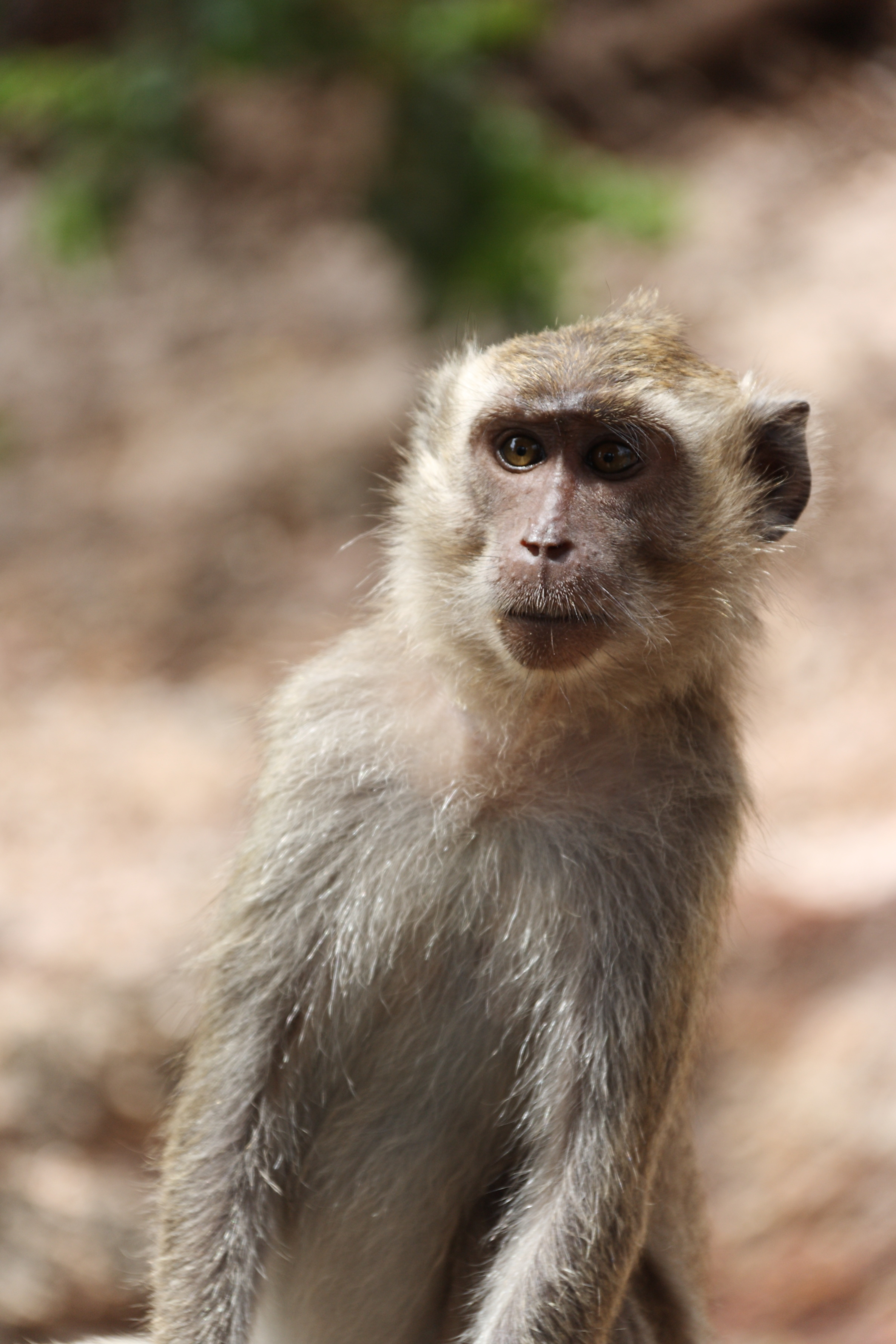
Crab-eating macaque

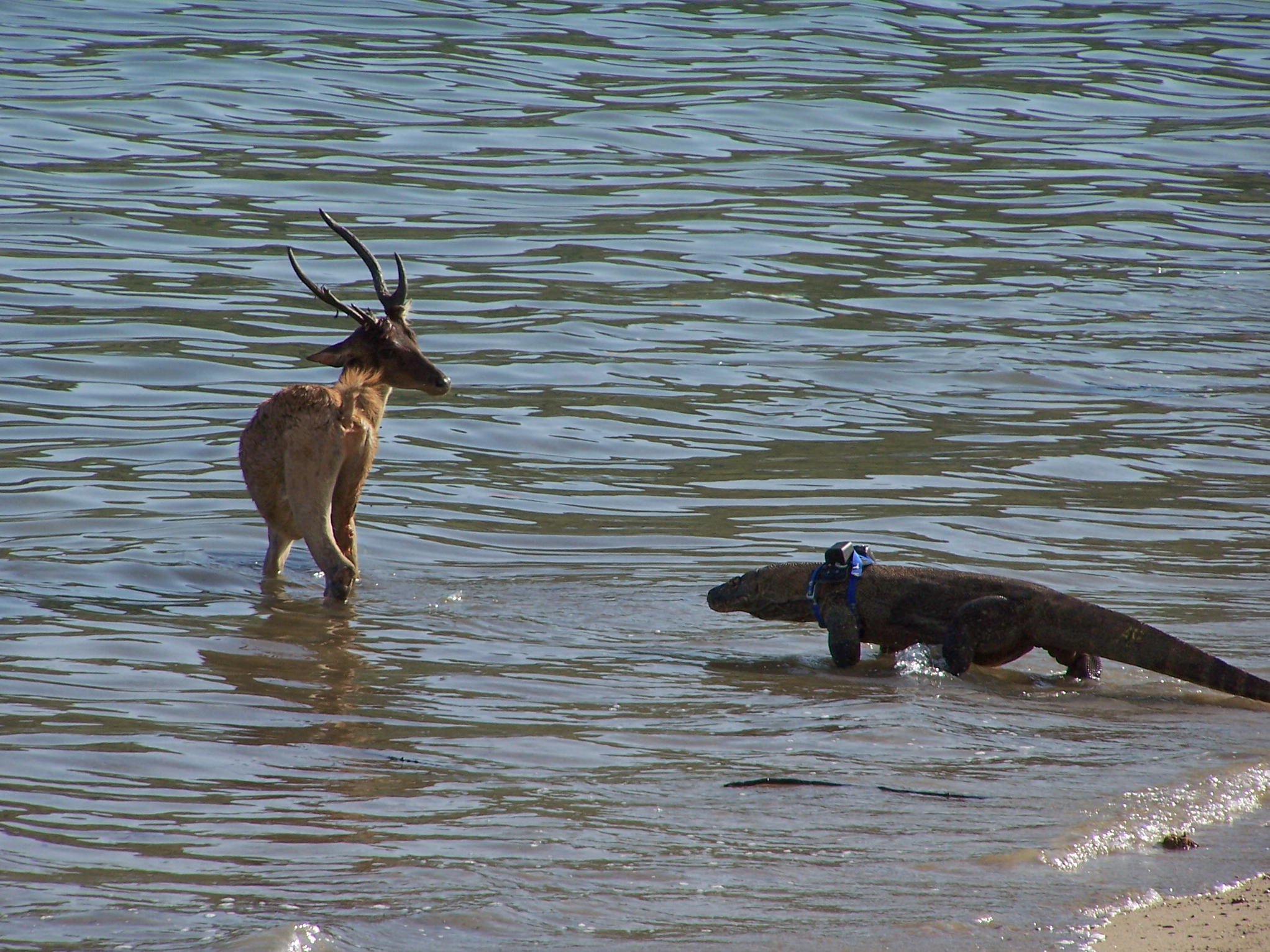
Komodo dragon stalking deer. Note the tracking device on the dragon's neck

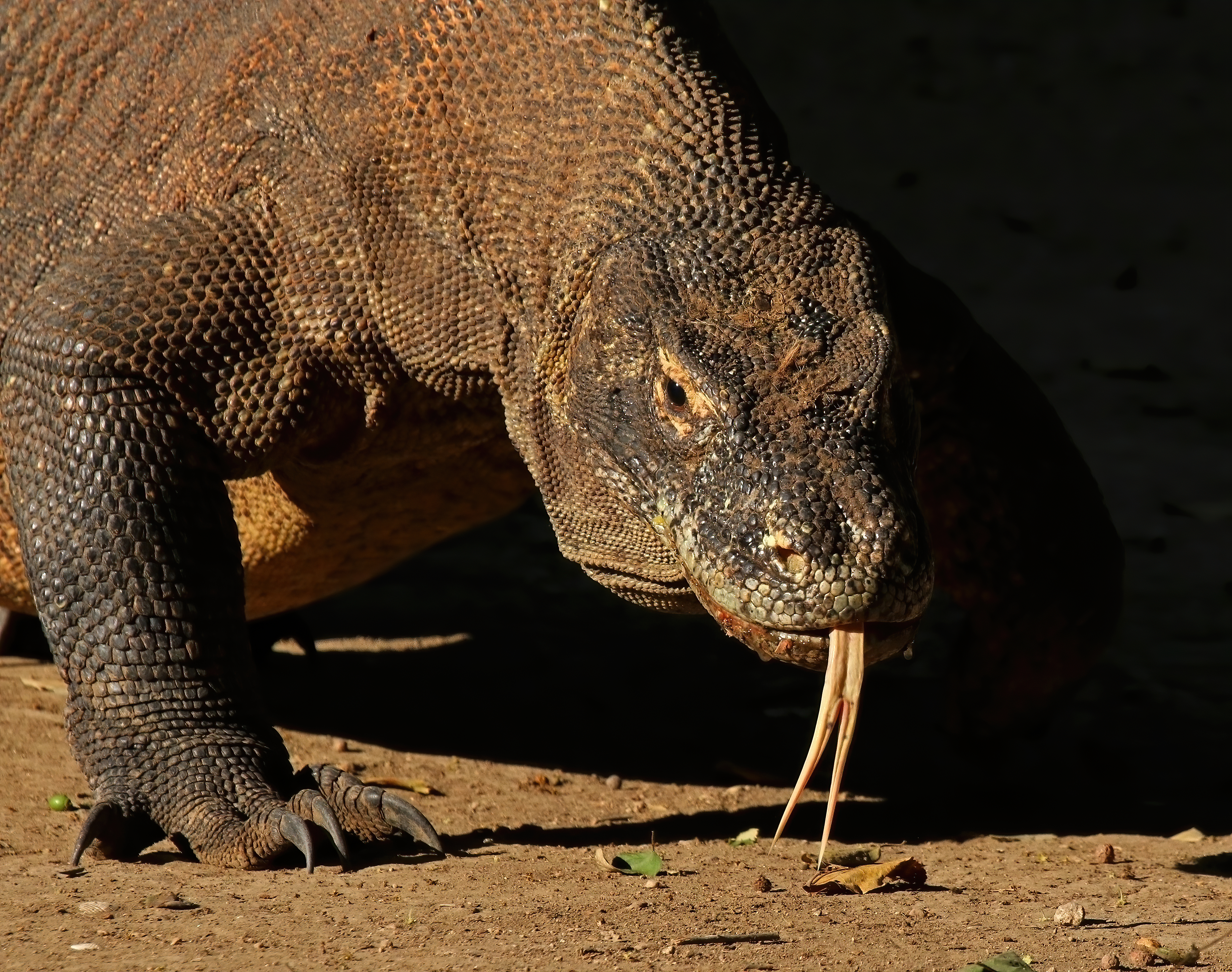
Komodo on Rinca

== Management ==
Komodo National Park (KNP) was set up as a Technical Implementation Unit of the Directorate-General of Forest Protection and Nature Conservation (PHKA), of the Ministry of Forestry. Its management is headed by the Komodo National Park Authority, in West Flores. Also in West Flores - but as a separate unit - is the Directorship of Conservation Areas. The Nature Conservancy (TNC, an American environmental organization), is director for the Coastal and Marine Program.

The Nature Conservancy entered into a partnership with the Department of Forestry and Conservation (Perlindungan Hutan dan Pelastrian Alam/PHPA) in 1995, to manage the Komodo National Park for 25 years.

A management plan was co-authored with TNC and implemented in 2000 to address problem of increasing resource exploitation, both marine and terrestrial. The plan was supported by the World Bank but faced objections from some local people and local NGOs who argued that they had not been consulted by the plan and would not share in the benefits. Most pressure on marine resources originates from fishing communities and commercial enterprises from outside the park. However, regulations and restrictions on resource use impact mostly on park residents, who have few options to make a living but rely on what the park has to offer. The provision of alternative livelihoods is part of the overall management strategy, but communities within the park are yet to benefit from appropriate measures addressing their needs.

A non-profit joint venture company, PT Putri Naga Komodo (PT PNK), was established to operate tourist facilities in the hope of eventually making the park financially self-sustaining. PT PNK was partially funded by the TNC and the World Bank. After 5 years operation, in 2010 Putri Naga Komodo's (PNK) permit was compromised. After that, more illegal fishermen arrived as enforcement declined greatly following the exit of TNC which had helped fight destructive fishing practices. In early 2012, dive operators and conservationists found many desolate coral sites, reminiscent of grey moonscapes. Illegal fishermen continue to blast sites with 'bombs' in a process known as blast fishing. The fisherman use a mixture of fertilizer and kerosene in beer bottles as explosives, or use squeeze bottles to squirt cyanide into the coral in order to stun and capture fish. In the past two years more than 60 illegal fishermen have been arrested. One of the suspects was shot and killed after he tried to evade capture by throwing fish bombs at the rangers.

Park managers have been conducting demographic status of the current living Komodo dragon populations across Komodo National Park. Komodo National Park contains five islands that inhabit Komodo dragons populations which hold the most desirable resources for the protected species. Two of the large islands, Komodo and Rinca, hold two of the largest populations on the island with three smaller ones being Padar, Gili Motang, and Nusa Kode. To help increase the population of Komodo dragons in the park, habitat management focuses on maintaining the environments on Komodo Island like the savannah grasslands and forests. This increases the population of prey species like the Timor deer for the Komodo by maintaining the favored habitat. The results of the two populations here have shown to have almost stable or stable time average population growth rates. Conservation efforts on smaller islands have increased due to having smaller populations, which have increased extinction rates.

=== Conflicts between conservation authorities and local community ===
Controversy surrounds the death of several fishermen since the 1980s. The circumstances of the fishermen's deaths are contested. While park patrols (including, at the time, police and navy personnel) claim they acted in self-defense, fishing communities accuse park management of having deliberately killed the fishermen.

In late February 2014, Brimob Special Police shot dead two deer poachers, when they opened fire with their homemade firearms.

== Tourism ==
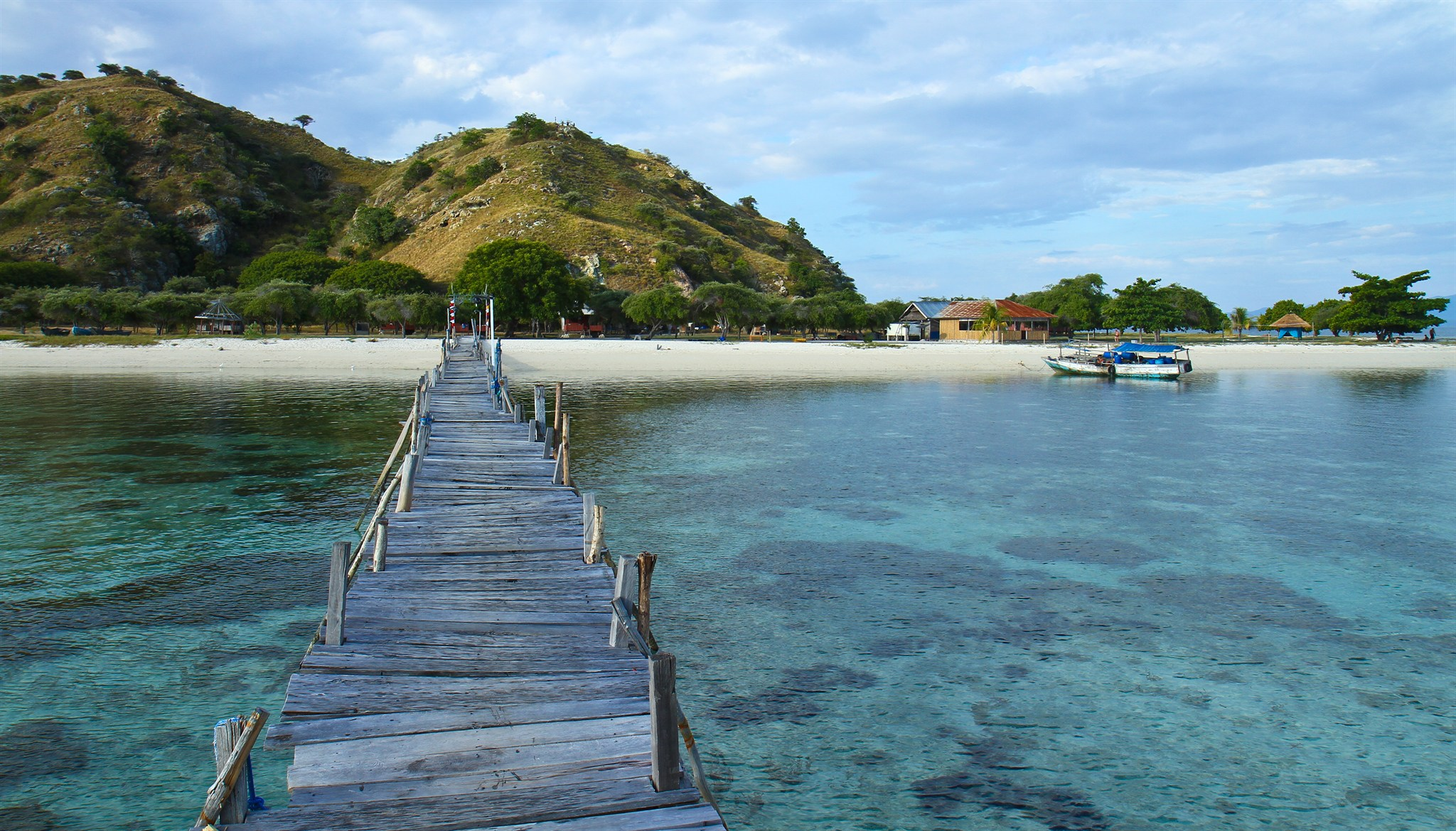
Kanawa Island, a tourist island in the Komodo National Park.

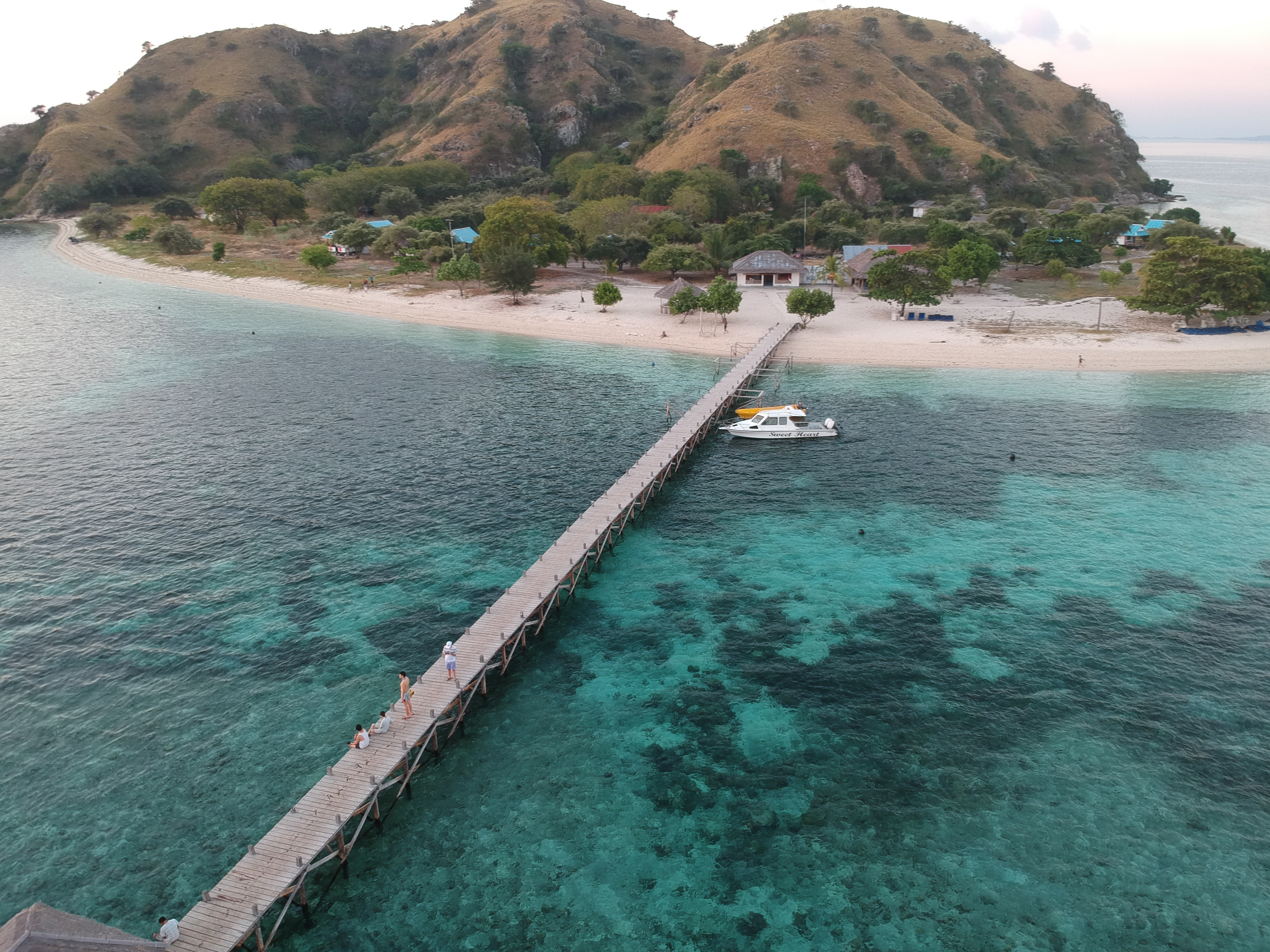
Kanawa Island from above.

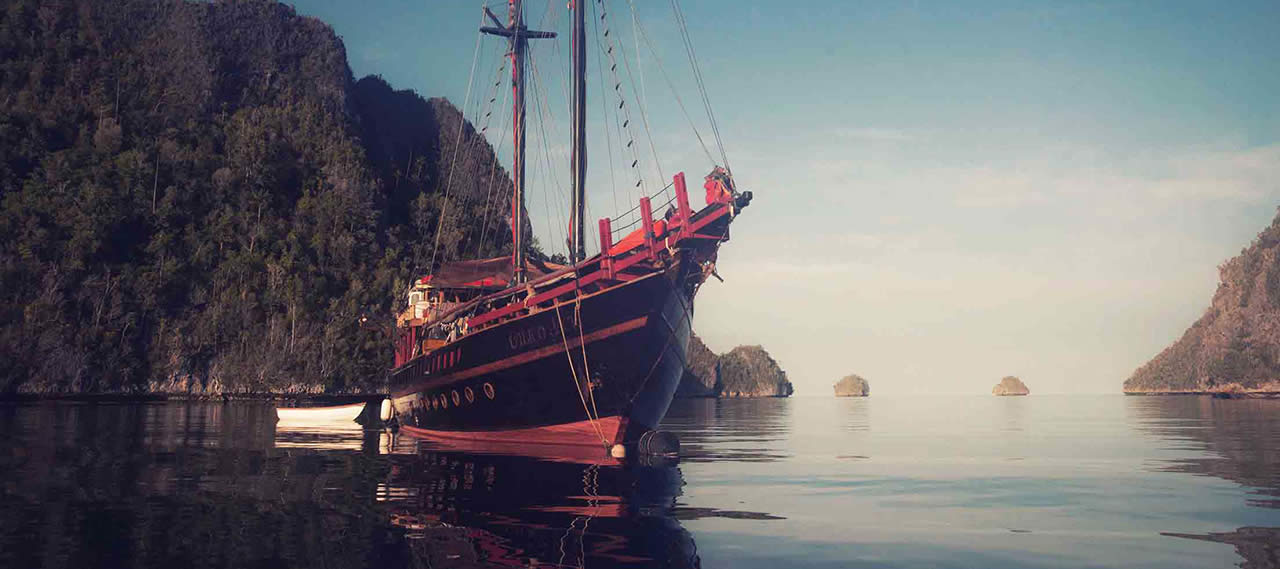
A Scuba diving boat in Komodo National Park.

Scuba diving is popular because of the park's high marine biodiversity. Six well-known diving sites are Manta Alley, Crystal Rock and Castle Rock, Batu Bolong, Yellow Wall, the Cauldron and Tatawa Besar.

The development of ecotourism, largely marine-based, is the main strategy to make the park self-financing and generate sufficient revenue through entrance fees and tourism licenses to cover operational and managerial costs. To this end, a joint venture between TNC and a tourism operator were granted a tourism concession, that also entails extensive park management rights. This concession has generated an ongoing controversy. The joint venture has been accused of making decisions behind closed doors, and many people in and around Komodo claim that they have not been consulted regarding decisions that ultimately affect their lives. The growth of the tourism sector has also led to extensive land grabbing in the areas surrounding the park as poorer people sell their lands to foreign business investors.

Komodo Island and Rinca were once part of Flores and they are separated from the large Island of Sumbawa to the West by the Sape Strait. The ocean in the Strait drops hundreds of meters. The Pacific Ocean to the north and the Indian Ocean to the south are actually at different heights – so the flow of currents from the Pacific to the Indian during tidal exchanges makes the currents among the strongest in the world. In the (relatively) shallow waters along the east coast of Komodo towards Labuan Bajo, these currents can be extremely dangerous with inexperienced guides.

The number of visitors to the park increased from 36,000 in 2009 to 45,000 in 2010. Most of the visitors were foreign tourists as the high transport cost to this remote location is less affordable for local visitors. The park can accommodate up to 60,000 visitors a year according to the local tourism agency.

Several types of boat tours run through the national park including upscale scuba liveaboards, short daily snorkel trips and 4 day, 3 night 'tourist boats' between Lombok and Flores. The tourist boats from Port of Labuan Bajo run very frequently, but have uncertain safety records. In an August 2014 incident one of these tourist boats sank, and 2 tourists were lost. Strong currents and waves separated the stranded passengers and crew who were floating at sea in life jackets.

Impact on local people

The Indonesian government's tourism development has focused on making Komodo National Park a "super-premium tourist destination" (since 2019), to attract wealthier visitors. This has resulted in zoning changes which reduce land access to local people and have resulted in deforestation. Additionally, the government's policy supports corporate tourist organizations, as a way to help develop the "super-premium tourist destination" status. One of the local tribes the Ata Modo, has deep cultural ties with the Komodo dragon, with one myth even stating they are twins. The tribe has tried establishing local culturally relevant tourist options, leaning into their connection with the Komodo dragon as a way to compete with foreign tourism operators. In 2019, the governor of the East Nusa Tenggara province, made a press announcement, about relocating indigenous people from Komodo Island to some of the surrounding areas, which was met with large protests by the local people. As of 2021, the government has seemed to back down from this claim.

Closure of the park

In early 2019, the Nusa Tenggara Timor (NTT) provincial governor Viktor Laiskodat announced a plan to close a section of the park (a main section on Komodo Island) for a year in order to make improvements. The suggestion was that other parts of the park, including Rinca and Padar Islands and certain parts of Komodo Island, would remain open. The governor's plan met with opposition from the local community and some parts of the wider public. In response, the Indonesian Environment and Forestry Minister, Siti Nurbaya said that she would summon representatives from the NTT administration for discussions, noting that decisions about conservation areas were under the jurisdiction of the central government. A final decision about the proposed closure was expected to be announced by the central government around mid-2019.

In July 2019, it was confirmed that Komodo Island would be closed for around one year from the beginning of 2020. Governor Laiskodat said that a budget of Rp 100 billion (around $US 7.2 million) would be provided to support the conservation program. The plan is controversial: Governor Laiskodat has suggested that an expensive entrance fee be charged to foreign tourists while local villagers who live on Komodo Island are worried about the possible loss of income. The park was closed for almost six months because of the COVID-19 pandemic, but was reopened to local tourists on 6 July 2020, then to domestic tourists in August 2020 and subsequently to foreign tourists. In December 2022, it was confirmed that the planned controversial increase in entrance fees, which had already been postponed by 5 months, was being canceled by the Indonesian government.

Periodic closures of the park are expected to take place in mid-2025, to help ease the strain on the park's fragile ecosystem.

== See also ==
- Tourism in Indonesia
- Galápagos Islands
- Great Barrier Reef
- List of national parks
- Valdes Peninsula
- Port of Labuan Bajo

== Bibliography ==
- Borchers, Henning; Gustave, Ruddy (November 2007). "14. Conservation and conflict in Komodo National Park". In Navjot S. Sodhi, Greg Acciaioli, Maribeth Erb and Alan Khee-Jin Tan (ed.). Biodiversity and Human Livelihoods in Protected Areas - Case Studies from the Malay Archipelago (from Part II - Conservation with and against people(s)). Cambridge University Press. pp. 187–202. doi:10.1017/CBO9780511542169.014. ISBN 978-0-521-87021-4.
- Ping, Ho Shu (2006). Partners in conservation? Communities, contestation and conflict in Komodo National Park, Indonesia (PDF) (Master thesis in Social science). National University of Singapore.
