= Gili Motang =

Island in Indonesia

Coordinates: 8°48′S 119°48′E

Gili Motang is a small island in Eastern Indonesia. It is part of the Lesser Sunda Islands chain, which together with the Greater Sunda Islands to the west make up the Sunda Islands.

The island, volcanic in origin, is approximately 30 km^{2} (12 mi^{2}) in area.

Home to a small population of about 100 Komodo dragons, Gili Motang is part of Komodo National Park. In 1991, as part of the national park, Gili Motang was accepted as a UNESCO World Heritage Site.
