= Fernando Martín (footballer) =

Spanish footballer (1981–2025)

Personal information
- Full name: Fernando Martín Carreras
- Date of birth: 27 August 1981
- Place of birth: Valencia, Spain
- Date of death: 26 December 2025 (aged 44)
- Place of death: Padar, Indonesia
- Height: 1.84 m (6 ft 0 in)
- Position: Centre-back

Youth career
- 1997–2000: Benimar

Senior career*
| Years | Team | Apps | (Gls) |
| 2000–2002 | Pego | | |
| 2002–2005 | Eldense | | |
| 2005–2007 | Benidorm | 56 | (2) |
| 2007–2008 | Cultural Leonesa | 28 | (1) |
| 2008–2012 | Alcoyano | 138 | (12) |
| 2012–2013 | Cartagena | 13 | (0) |
| 2013–2014 | Ontinyent | 20 | (0) |
| 2014–2015 | La Nucía | 38 | (0) |
| 2015–2016 | Paterna | 35 | (1) |
| Total | | 316+ | (15+) |

Managerial career
- 2025: Valencia B (women)
- * Club domestic league appearances and goals

Fernando Martín Carreras (27 August 1981 – 26 December 2025) was a Spanish professional footballer who played as a central defender.

His career was spent mostly in the Segunda División B, making 219 appearances for five clubs, mainly Alcoyano. He won promotion to Segunda División with that team, in which he played 24 games in the 2011–12 season.

== Playing career ==
Born in Valencia, Martín began his career with Pego CF and CD Eldense. After two years with Benidorm CF in the Segunda División B, he joined Cultural y Deportiva Leonesa of the same league on 30 July 2007. He started in all but three of his appearances in his one season with the side from León.

Martín returned to his native Valencian Community in July 2008, signing for CD Alcoyano. The club missed out on promotion to Segunda División in 2009, when he gave away the ball for a last-minute goal that awarded the win to Cartagena.

Martín eventually became their captain. He helped them to promotion in 2011, playing a sole second-division campaign in 2011–12 in which they were relegated; his professional debut took place on 27 August 2011, when he featured 90 minutes of a 1–1 home draw against CD Numancia.

Following Alcoyano's relegation, Martín signed for Cartagena back in the third tier, and was dismissed alongside Manuel Rueda in 2013; the decision was ruled as unlawful by a judge and the players received compensation through the club's bankruptcy proceedings. The payments were made by February 2016, with the organisation avoiding liquidation as a result.

Martín represented Ontinyent CF in 2013–14, being relegated to Tercera División. In the following season, he appeared for CF La Nucía in that division, meeting the same fate.

== Coaching career ==
Martín spent nine years coaching the academy teams of Valencia CF Femenino before being named in the coaching staff of its main squad in early 2024. In 2025, he was appointed manager of the reserves in the Tercera Federación.

== Personal life and death ==
Martín died on 26 December 2025 at the age of 44, after the boat he was traveling in sank off the coast of Padar, Indonesia. Three of his children died, while his wife and one daughter survived.

Martín lost his mother at a young age.
