= Padar, Indonesia =

Small island in East Nusa Tenggara, Indonesia

Padar
Native name: Pulau Padar
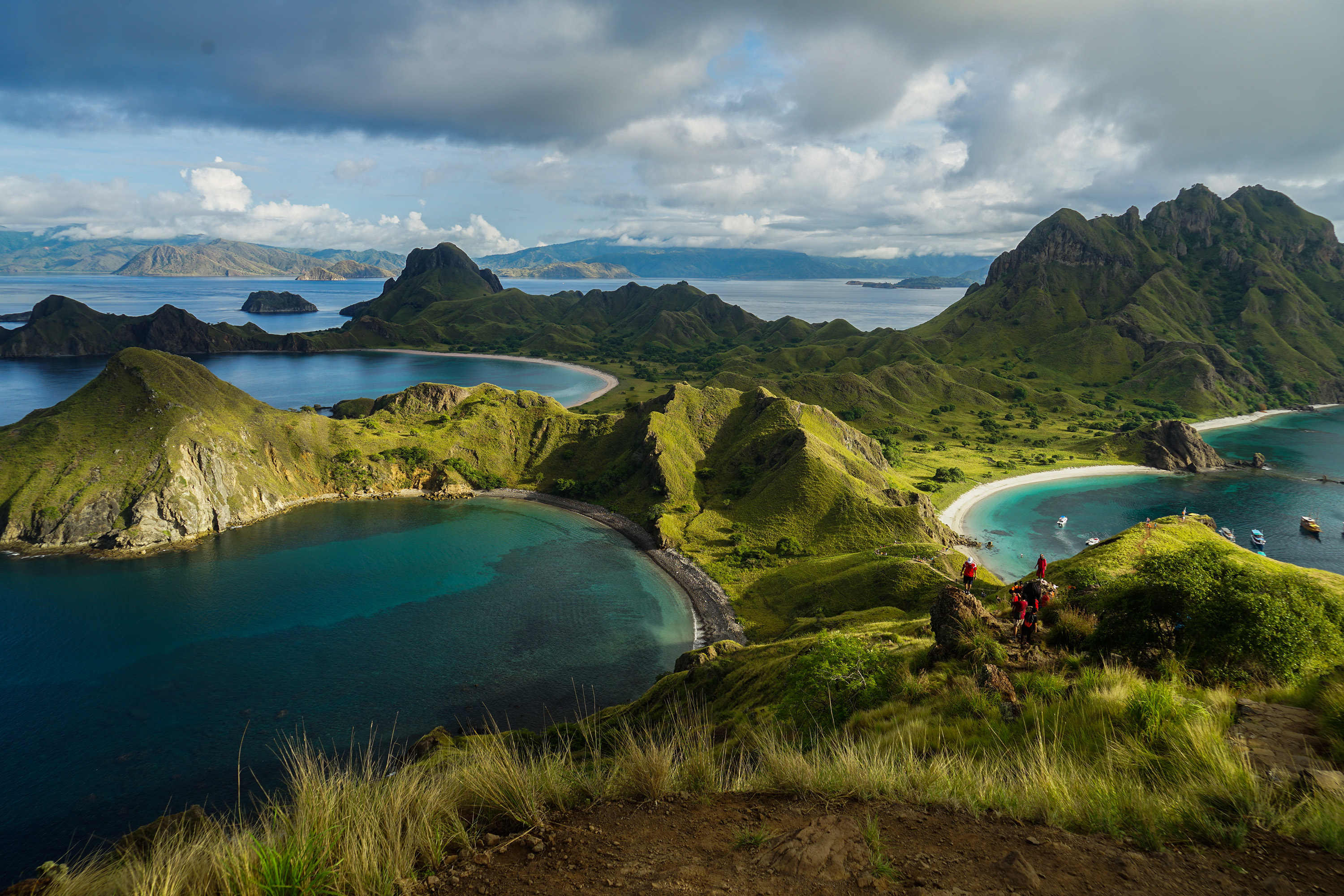
- Padar island

- Location within Indonesia

Geography
- Location: Maritime Southeast Asia
- Coordinates: 8.654°S 119.574°E
- Archipelago: Lesser Sunda Islands

Administration
- Indonesia
- Province: East Nusa Tenggara

Padar (Indonesian pronunciation: [ˈpadar]), also known as Pada, is a small island located between the islands of Komodo and Rinca within Komodo archipelago, which is part of the West Manggarai Regency in East Nusa Tenggara, Indonesia. It is the third-largest island in Komodo National Park.

The Komodo archipelago is famous for Komodo dragons, giant lizards that can reach up to 3 metres (9.8 ft) in length. While the neighboring islands of Komodo and Rinca are home to these iconic lizards, Komodo dragons were once considered extinct on Padar. However, in 2004, the Komodo Survival Agency reported sightings of at least 12 individuals, including a hatchling, suggesting a possible resurgence of the dragons on Padar.

The island’s topography is rugged, with steep volcanic mountains and hills surrounded by deep bays. Padar has a dry climate, and its vegetation consists mainly of bushes and grasslands, creating a savanna-like landscape. The island features four deep bays with beaches of varying colors; most are white sand, while some have gray and pink sands. The waters around Padar are also known for several popular sites for scuba diving and snorkelling.

== Gallery ==
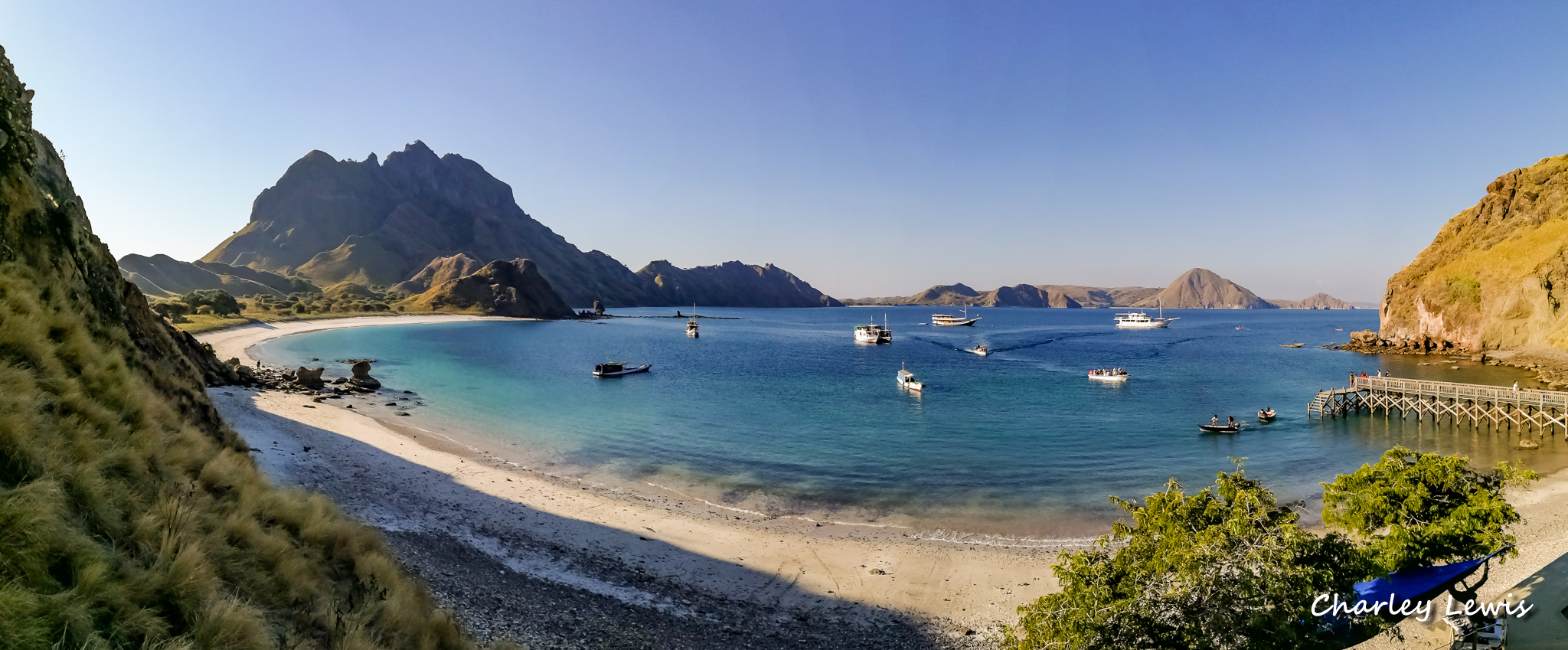
Padar Island, harbour panorama

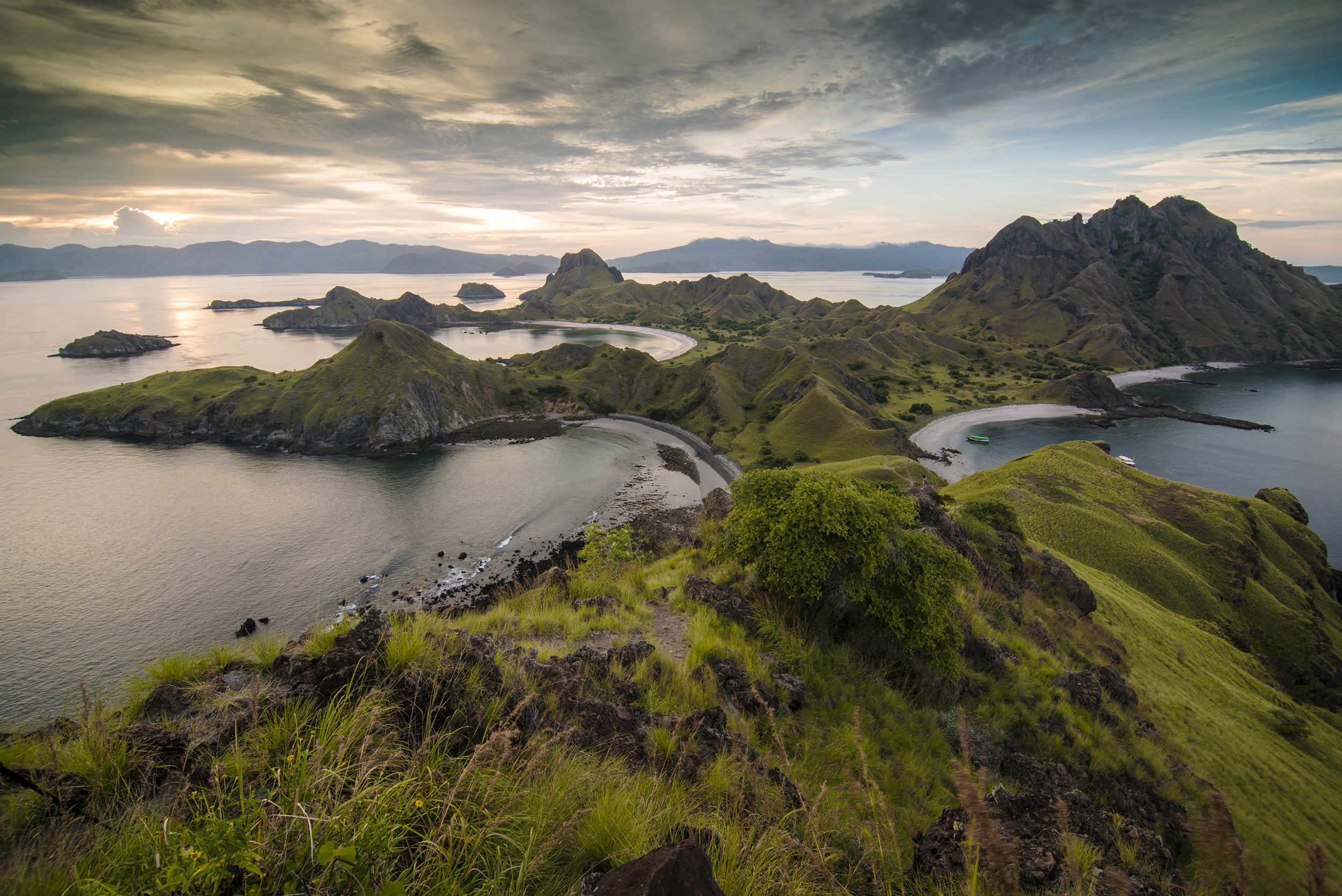
Sunset, Padar Island

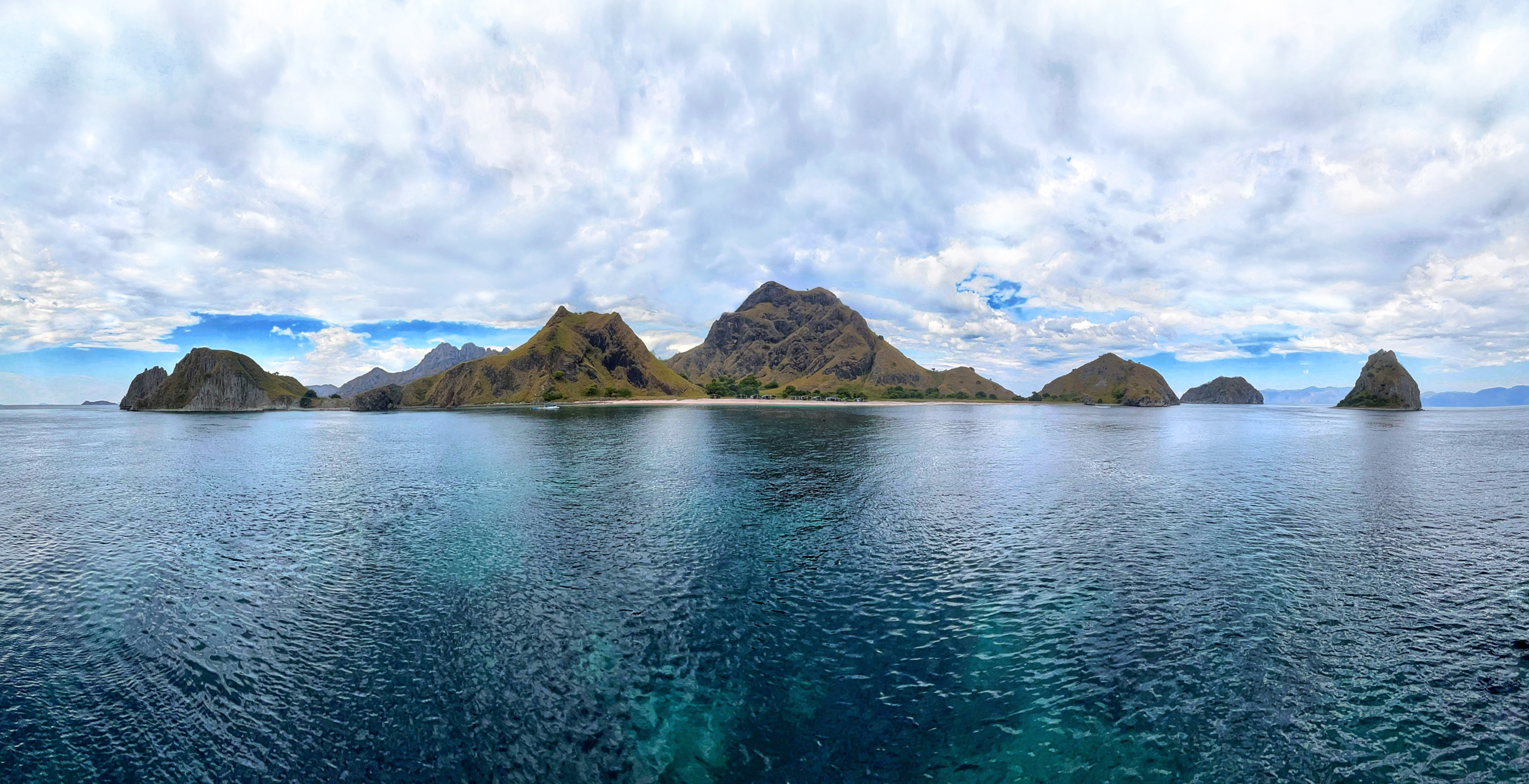
View of western coast
