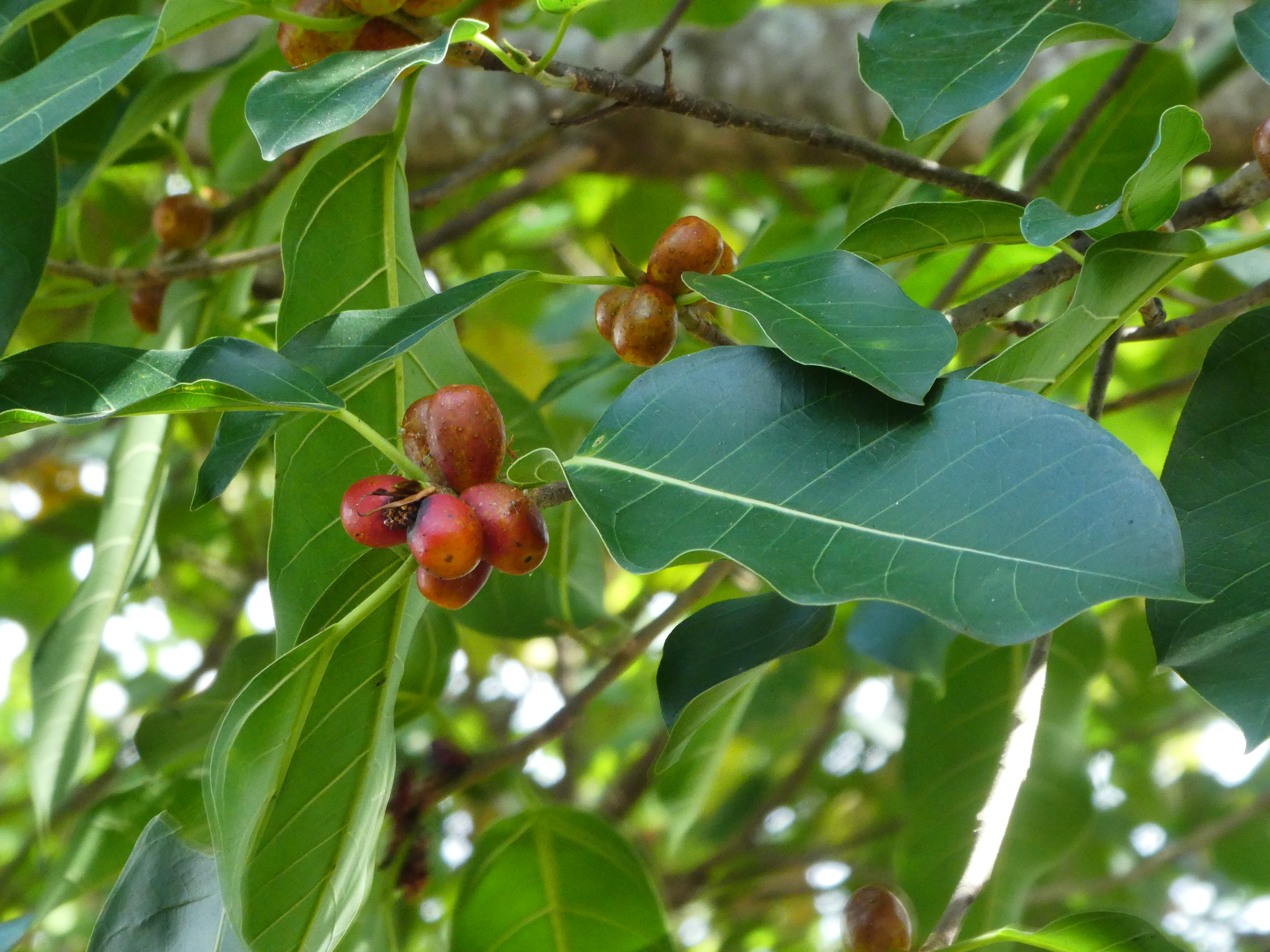
- Fruit and leaves

Conservation status
- Least Concern (IUCN 3.1)

Scientific classification
- Kingdom: Plantae
- Clade: Tracheophytes
- Clade: Angiosperms
- Clade: Eudicots
- Clade: Rosids
- Order: Rosales
- Family: Moraceae
- Genus: Ficus
- Subgenus: F. subg. Urostigma
- Species: F. drupacea

Binomial name
- Ficus drupacea Thunb.

Synonyms
- 21 synonyms: Urostigma drupaceum (Thunb.) Miq.; Ficus aurantiicarpa Elmer; Ficus chrysochlamys K.Schum. & Lauterb.; Ficus chrysocoma Blume; Ficus citrifolia Willd.; Ficus drupacea var. auranticarpa (Elmer) Corner; Ficus drupacea var. glabrata Corner; Ficus drupacea var. mysorensis (Roth) M.R.Almeida; Ficus drupacea var. pedicellata Corner; Ficus drupacea var. pubescens (Roem. & Schult.) Corner; Ficus drupacea var. subrepanda (Wall. ex King) D.Basu; Ficus ellipsoidea F.Muell. ex Benth.; Ficus gonia Buch.-Ham.; Ficus indica L.; Ficus mysorensis Roth; Ficus mysorensis var. dasycarpa (Miq.) M.F.Barrett; Ficus mysorensis f. parvifolia Miq.; Ficus mysorensis var. pubescens Roem. & Schult.; Ficus mysorensis var. pubescens (Roth) King; Ficus mysorensis var. subrepanda Wall. ex King; Ficus payapa Blanco; Ficus pilosa Reinw. ex Blume; Ficus pilosa var. chrysocoma (Blume) King; Ficus pubescens Roth; Ficus rupestris Buch.-Ham.; Ficus subrepanda (Wall. ex King) King; Ficus vidaliana Warb.; Urostigma bicorne Miq.; Urostigma chrysotrix Miq.; Urostigma dasycarpum Miq.; Urostigma mysorense (Roth) Miq.; Urostigma pilosum (Reinw. ex Blume) Miq.; Urostigma subcuspidatum Miq.

= Ficus drupacea =

Species of fig

Ficus drupacea, also known as the brown-woolly fig or Mysore fig, is a tropical tree native to Southeast Asia and Northeast Australia (it has been introduced into the New World tropics, including Puerto Rico). It is a strangler fig; it begins its life cycle as an epiphyte on a larger tree, which it eventually engulfs. Its distinctive features include dense, woolly pubescence, bright yellow to red fleshy fruit, and grayish white bark. It can reach heights of 10–30 meters (33–98 ft). Its fruit are eaten by pigeons, and it is pollinated by Eupristina belgaumensis. It occurs in environments ranging from sea-level beachfront environments to montane forests, up to 1,000 metres (3,300 feet).
