= Statue of Gautama Buddha =

Statue of Gautama Buddha may refer to:

- Daibutsu, a type of Japanese statue
- Great Buddha (disambiguation)

== Large Gautama Buddha statues ==
- Awaji Kannon, an 80 metres (260 ft) statue in Japan
- Buddha Statue of Hyderabad, an 18 metres (59 ft) statue in India
- Buddhas of Bamiyan, a 55 metres (180 ft) statue and a 38 metres (125 ft) statue in Afghanistan, now destroyed
- Dhyana Buddha statue, a 38 metres (125 ft) statue in India
- Grand Buddha at Ling Shan, a 88 metres (289 ft) statue in China
- Laykyun Sekkya, a 116 metres (381 ft) statue in Myanmar
- Luangpho Yai, a 59.2 metres (194 ft) statue in Thailand
- Phuket Big Buddha, a 45 metres (148 ft) statue in Thailand
- Spring Temple Buddha, a 128 metres (420 ft) statue in China
- Statue of Gautama Buddha (Myanmar), a 77.9 metres (256 ft) tall statue in Myanmar
- The Big Buddha (Hong Kong), a 34 metres (112 ft) tall statue in Hong Kong
- Ushiku Daibutsu, a 100 metres (330 ft) tall statue in Japan

== Smaller Gautama Buddha statues ==
- Buddha Preaching his First Sermon (Sarnath), in India
- Emerald Buddha, in Thailand
- Gatbawi, in South Korea
- Karumadikkuttan, in India
- Phra Phuttha Sihing, in Thailand
- Seated Buddha from Gandhara, in Pakistan
- Standing Buddha from Gandhara (Tokyo), a Greco-Buddhist statue in Japan
- Sultanganj Buddha, from India and now in England
- Toluvila statue, in Sri Lanka
