= List of tallest statues =

This list of tallest statues includes completed statues that are at least 45 m (148 ft) tall. The height values in this list are measured to the highest part of the human or animal figure, but exclude the height of any mast, spire, or other structure that extends higher than the tallest figure in the monument.

The definition of statue for this list is a free-standing sculpture (as opposed to a relief), representing one or more people or animals (real or mythical), in their entirety or partially (such as a bust). Heights stated are those of the statue itself and (separately) the total height of the monument that includes structures the statue is standing on or holding. Monuments that contain statues are included in this list only if the statue fulfills these and the height criteria.

== Existing ==
Image	Statue	Depicts	Location	Country/Region	Completed	Height of statue	Height of statue + base	Notes	Coordinates
	Statue of Unity	Vallabhbhai Patel	Sardar Sarovar Dam, Kevadiya, Narmada District, Gujarat	India	2018	182 m (597 ft)	240 m (790 ft)	World's tallest statue, stands on a 58 m (190 ft) base. 240 m (787 ft) total monument height.	21°50′16.8″N 73°43′08.7″E
	Spring Temple Buddha	Buddha (Vairocana)	Lushan, Henan	China	2008	128 m (420 ft)	208 m (682 ft)	World's tallest statue 2008–2018. Stands on a 19.3 m (63 ft) lotus throne, and other stacked base platforms of various height. 208 m (682 ft) total monument height.	33°46′30″N 112°27′03″E
	Laykyun Sekkya	Buddha (Gautama)	Khatakan Taung, near Monywa, Sagaing Division	Myanmar (Burma)	2008	115.8 m (380 ft)	129.2 m (424 ft)	Stands on a 13.41 m (44 ft) lotus throne. 129.2 m (424 ft) total monument height.	22.0803°N 95.2893°E
	Statue of Belief	Shiva	Nathdwara, Rajasthan	India	2020	106 m (348 ft)	112 m (367 ft)	With a 33 m (108 ft) feet base total monument height of 106 m (348 ft). World's tallest Shiva statue.	24.9190°N 73.8178°E
	Ushiku Daibutsu	Buddha (Amitābha)	Ushiku, Ibaraki Prefecture	Japan	1993	100 m (330 ft)	120 m (390 ft)	World's tallest statue 1993–2008. Stands on a 10 m (33 ft) lotus throne and 10 m (33 ft) pedestal/building. 120 m (394 ft) total monument height.	35.9827°N 140.2203°E
	Guishan Guanyin	Guanyin – Eleven-headed Thousand-armed Guanyin	Weishan, Changsha, Hunan	China	2009	99 m (325 ft)	99 m (325 ft)	Gilded bronze statue.	28°11′5.8″N 111°57′48.1″E
	Mother of All Asia – Tower of Peace	Mary	Pagkilatan, Batangas City	Philippines	2021	98.15 m (322.0 ft)	98.15 m (322.0 ft)	Tallest statue in the Philippines and the tallest statue of the Virgin Mary in the world.	13.6423°N 121.0433°E
	Great Buddha of Thailand	Buddha (Gautama)	Ang Thong	Thailand	2008	93 m (305 ft)	93 m (305 ft)	Concrete statue painted gold.	14°35′35.6″N 100°22′40.0″E
	Sendai Daikannon	Kannon (Avalokiteśvara)	Sendai, Miyagi Prefecture	Japan	1991	92 m (302 ft)	100 m (330 ft)	World's tallest statue 1991–1993; the monument itself is 302 feet (92 m) tall, while the pedestal brings its total height to 328 feet (100 m).	38.3005°N 140.8236°E
	Dai Kannon of Kita no Miyako park	Kannon (Avalokiteśvara) – Kannon (Byakue)	Ashibetsu, Hokkaidō	Japan	1989	88 m (289 ft)	88 m (289 ft)	World's tallest statue 1989–1991.	43°31′41.4″N 142°11′53.1″E
	The Motherland Calls	Mother Motherland	Volgograd	Russia	1967	85 m (279 ft)	85 m (279 ft)	Tallest statue in Europe.	48°44′32.5″N 44°32′13.5″E
	Grand Buddha at Ling Shan	Buddha (Amitābha)	Wuxi, Jiangsu	China	1996	79 m (259 ft)	88 m (289 ft)	88 meters total height, including 9 m lotus pedestal.	31°25′55″N 120°5′29″E
	Guanyin of Nanshan	Guanyin	Sanya, Hainan	China	2005	78 m (256 ft)	108 m (354 ft)	Total height is 108 m (354 ft) including the pedestal/building.	18.2927°N 109.2087°E
	Statue of Gautama Buddha	Buddha (Gautama)	Kyaikhto, Mon State	Myanmar	2019	77.9 m (256 ft)	?		17.3183733°N 97.0281018°E
	Bronze statue of Dizang at Mount Jiuhua (Dizang at Mount Jiuhua)	Ksitigarbha	Qingyang County	China	2012	76 m (249 ft)	99 m (325 ft)	Standing 99 m in total height.	30.5390°N 117.8042°E
	Ruyilun Guanyin statue in Tsz Shan Monastery	GuanyinCintamanicakra	Hong Kong	Hong Kong	2012	76 m (249 ft)	76 m (249 ft)		22.4756°N 114.2063°E
	Garuda Wisnu Kencana statue	Garuda ridden by Vishnu	Garuda Wisnu Kencana Cultural Park, Bali	Indonesia	2018	76 m (249 ft)	122 m (400 ft)	The total height of the monument, including the 46-meter base pedestal, is 122 m (400 ft).	8.813951°S 115.166882°E
	Phra Buddha Chok	Buddha (Gautama)	Huay Pong, Lop Buri	Thailand	2018	75 m (246 ft)	75 m (246 ft)	Second-tallest Buddha statue in Thailand.	14.5749°N 100.4200°E
	Sitting Buddha at Bodhi Tahtaung	Buddha (Gautama)	Maha Bodhi Tahtaung, Monywa, Sagaing Division	Myanmar	2022	74 m (242 ft)	74 m (242 ft)		
	Kaga Kannon	Kannon (Avalokiteśvara)	Kaga, Ishikawa Prefecture	Japan	1987	73 m (240 ft)	73 m (240 ft)	With a 33 m (108 ft) feet base total monument height of 106 m (348 ft).	24.9204°N 73.8170°E
	The Buddha Statue	Buddha (Gautama)	Son Tay, Hanoi	Vietnam	2020	72 m (236 ft)	72 m (236 ft)	Tallest statue in Southeast Asia.	
	Confucius of Mount Ni	Confucius	Nishan (Mount Ni), Qufu, Shandong	China	2016	72 m (236 ft)	72 m (236 ft)	Mount Ni is, according to mythology, the place where Confucius was born and forsaken for a period by his mother, to be taken care of by a tiger and an eagle.	35.4955°N 117.2053°E
	Leshan Giant Buddha	Buddha (Maitreya)	Leshan	China	803	71 m (233 ft)	71 m (233 ft)	Construction started in 713. With two more than 16 m (52 ft) carving statues of Lokapala.	29.5472°N 103.7692°E
	Chao Mae Kuan Im	Guanyin	Mueang Chiang Rai District, Chiang Rai Province	Thailand	2016	69 m (226 ft)	69 m (226 ft)	Located in Wat Huay Pla Kang.	19.949806°N 99.806405°E
	Phra Buddha Dhammakaya Dhepmongkol	Buddha (Gautama)	Wat Paknam Bhasicharoen, Bangkok	Thailand	2022	69 m (226 ft)	69 m (226 ft)		13.7212°N 100.4711°E
	Buddha	Buddha (Gautama)	Yiyang County, Jiangxi	China	2004–05	68 m (223 ft)	68 m (223 ft)	The world's largest reclining stone statue, which signifies the Buddha Shakyamuni's departure into final nirvana. It is 68 m (223 ft) high and 416 m (1,365 ft) long.	
	fr:Quan Âm de Sơn Trà	Quan Âm (Guanyin)	Da Nang, Vietnam	Vietnam	2010	67 m (220 ft)	67 m (220 ft)		16.0996°N 108.2769°E
	Taihu Guanyin Temple	Guanyin	Xishan Island	China	2017	67 m (220 ft)	67 m (220 ft)		31.106°N 120.239°E
	Yang'asha of Guizhou	Yang'asha (Miao goddess of beauty)	Guizhou	China	2017	66 m (217 ft)	88 m (289 ft)	Stainless steel statue is 88 meters including the pedestal.	26.7370°N 108.4574°E
	Mother Ukraine	The Motherland	Kyiv	Ukraine	1981	62 m (203 ft)	102 m (335 ft)	Stands on a 40 m (130 ft) pedestal, 102 m (335 ft) total monument height.	50.4265°N 30.5632°E
	Guze Jibo Daikannon of the Naritasan Kurume Bunin temple	Kannon (Avalokiteśvara) – Kannon (Jibo)	Kurume, Fukuoka prefecture	Japan	1983	62 m (203 ft)	62 m (203 ft)		33.2854°N 130.5349°E
	Guanyin of Mount Xiqiao	Guanyin	Nanhai district, Foshan, Guangdong	China	1998	62 m (203 ft)	77 m (253 ft)	Stands on a 15 m (49 ft) pedestal, 77 m (253 ft) total height.	22.9331°N 112.9717°E
	Jesus Blessed Sibea-bea	Jesus Christ	Sibea-bea, North Sumatra	Indonesia	2024	61 m (200 ft)	69 (226 ft)	Stands on a 8 m (26 ft) pedestal. (Maybe)	
	Guan Yu of Yuncheng	Guan Yu	Yuncheng, Shanxi	China	2010	61 m (200 ft)	80 m (260 ft)	Stands on a 19 m pedestal, 80 m (260 ft) total height.	34.9170°N 110.9640°E
	Phra Chao Yai Kaew Mukda Sri Trairat	Buddha (Gautama)	Mukdahan, Thailand	Thailand	2018	60 m (200 ft)			16.4981°N 104.7277°E
	Luangpho Yai	Buddha (Gautama)	Wat Bhurapha Piram, Meaung, Roi Et, Thailand	Thailand	1979	59.2 m (194 ft)	67.9 m (223 ft)	Stands on an 8.7 m (29 ft) base with small museum, 67.9 m (223 ft) total height.	16.0621°N 103.6585°E
	Lung Por Tuad Wat Kao	Lung Por Tuad	Nakhon Ratchasima, Thailand	Thailand	2018	59 m (194 ft)	59 m (194 ft)		14.3436°N 101.2548°E
	God of the Red Mountain (赤山神, Chìshānshén)	Chishanshen or Luminous God of the Red Mountain (赤山明神, Chìshān Míngshén), local variation of the Sea God (海神, Hǎishén)	Chishan (Red Mountain), Rongcheng, Weihai, Shandong	China	2010s	58.8 m (193 ft)	58.8 m (193 ft)	Bronze statue of Chishanshen, a localised manifestation of the Haishen (Sea God) in coastal Shandong. The statue, dominating over Rongcheng, is part of a temple complex known as the "Daming Holy Land" and faces the Yellow Sea.	36.8999°N 122.3989°E
	Phra Kakusunto	Buddha (Gautama)	Suphan Buri, Thailand	Thailand		58 m (190 ft)	58 m (190 ft)		14.1626°N 100.1612°E
	Aizu Jibo Dai-Kannon	Kannon (Avalokiteśvara) – Kannon (Jibo)	Aizuwakamatsu, Fukushima	Japan	1987	57 m (187 ft)	57 m (187 ft)		37.5509°N 139.9512°E
	Great Standing Maitreya Buddha	Buddha (Maitreya)	Emei Township, Hsinchu County	Taiwan	2011	56.7 m (186 ft)	72 m (236 ft)		24.6810°N 120.9857°E
	Tokyo Bay Kannon	Kannon (Avalokiteśvara)	Futtsu, Chiba	Japan	1961	56 m (184 ft)	56 m (184 ft)	Commemorates the dead of World War II.	35.2635°N 139.8624°E
	The Victor	John Gokongwei or the "Global Filipino"	Bridgetowne, Pasig, Metro Manila	Philippines	2023	55 m (180 ft)	60 m (200 ft)	Stands on a 5 m (16 ft) pedestal.	14°35′36.3″N 121°04′59.8″E
開元殿本殿與鄭成功像	Statue of Zheng Chenggong	Koxinga	Chiayi County	Taiwan	1995	54 m (177 ft)		With statues of 49 m (160 ft) (include seat) of two generals completed in 2013.	23.6042°N 120.3747°E
	Emperors Yan and Huang	Yan Emperor (Yandi) and Yellow Emperor (Huangdi)	Zhengzhou, Henan province	China	2007	51 m (167 ft)	106 m (348 ft)		34.9514°N 113.5110°E
	African Renaissance Monument	Family	Ouakam suburb, Dakar	Senegal	2008-2010	50 m (160 ft)		Tallest statue in Africa.	14°43′20″N 17°29′42″W
Usami_Dai_Kannon	Usami Dai-Kannon	Kannon (Avalokiteśvara)	Izu Peninsula, Itō, Shizuoka	Japan	1982	50 m (160 ft)	50 m (160 ft)	The largest sitting Kannon in Japan.	35.0236°N 139.0641°E
	Sodoshima Dai-Kannon	Kannon (Avalokiteśvara)	Shōdoshima, Shōzu District, Kagawa	Japan	1994	50 m (160 ft)	50 m (160 ft)	A tooth of the historical Buddha is said to be enshrined inside of it.	34.5119°N 134.2132°E
	Guerrero Chimalli (Chīmalli Warrior)	Chīmalli Warrior	Chimalhuacán, State of Mexico	Mexico	2014	50 m (160 ft)	60 m (200 ft)		19.413056°N 98.983889°W
	Our Lady of Mercy	Mary	Konotopie	Poland	2026	40.6 m (133 ft)	55.6 m (182 ft)	Stands on a 15 m (49 ft) pedestal	52.89661°N 19.11874°E
	Kande Vihara Buddha	Buddha (Samadhi)	Aluthgama	Sri Lanka	2002-2007	48.8 m (160 ft)	48.8 m (160 ft)	Sits on a 48.8 m (160 ft) this Sri Lanka.	6.449111°N 80.000278°E
	Dai Kannon of Kamaishi	Kannon(Guanyin)	Kamaishi	Japan	1970	48.5 m (159 ft)	48.5 m (159 ft)	Standing a Kannon Guanyin	39.25639°N 141.90083°E
	Donglin Dafo	Buddha (Amitabha)	Wenquan	China	2007-2013	48 m (157 ft)	81 m (266 ft)		29.563°N 115.938°E
	Jinding Dafo	Buddha (Gautama)	Dunhua	China	2011	48 m (157 ft)	38.4 m (126 ft)		43.313°N 128.237°E
	Samantabhadra (Ten Directions)	Buddha (Samantabhad)	Sichuan	China	2005	48 m (157 ft)	48 m (157 ft)		29.523°N 103.336°E
	Fo Guang Big Buddha	Buddha (Gautama)	Kaohsiung	Taiwan	2011	48 m (157 ft)	108 m (354 ft)		22.75708°N 120.44135°E
	Monumento a la Virgen de la Paz	Virgin Mary	Trujillo	Venezuela	1983	47 m (154 ft)	47 m (154 ft)		9.348°N 70.4639°W
	Statue of Liberty	Libertas	New York City	United States	1886	46 m (151 ft)	93 m (305 ft)	Stands on a 27 m (89 ft) pedestal and a 20 m (65 ft) foundation. 93 m (305 ft) total monument height.	40.689167°N 74.044444°W
	Nossa Senhora de Fátima	Virgin Mary	Ceará	Brazil	2016	45 m (148 ft)	45 m (148 ft)		7.2406554°S 39.3841296°W

== By category ==
Category	Statue	Image	Location	Country	Completed	Height of statue	Height of statue + base	Coordinates
Tallest statue overall (of Vallabhbhai Patel)	Statue of Unity		Sardar Sarovar Dam, Gujarat	India	2018	182 m (597 ft)	240 m (790 ft)	21°50′16.8″N 73°43′08.7″E
Tallest Buddhist statue (of Vairocana)	Spring Temple Buddha		Lushan, Henan	China	2008	128 m (420 ft)	208 m (682 ft)	33°46′30″N 112°27′03″E
Tallest statue of Gautama Buddha	Laykyun Sekkya		Khatakan Taung, near Monywa, Sagaing Division	Myanmar	2008	115.8 m (380 ft)	129.2 m (424 ft)	22.0803°N 95.2893°E
Tallest Hindu statue excluding base (of Shiva)	Statue of Belief		Nathdwara, Rajasthan	India	2020	106 m (348 ft)	112 m (367 ft)	24.9190°N 73.8178°E
Tallest Christian statue (of Mary)	Mother of All Asia – Tower of Peace		Pagkilatan, Batangas City	Philippines	2021	98.15 m (322.0 ft)	98.15 m (322.0 ft)	13.6423°N 121.0433°E
Tallest Hindu statue including base (of Vishnu and Garuda)	Garuda Wisnu Kencana statue		Garuda Wisnu Kencana Cultural Park, Bali	Indonesia	2018	76 m (249 ft)	122 m (400 ft)	8.813951°S 115.166882°E
Tallest statue of Confucius	Confucius of Mount Ni		Mount Ni, Shandong	China	2016	72 m (236 ft)	72 m (236 ft)	35.4955°N 117.2053°E
Tallest statue of Yang'asha	Yang'asha of Guizhou		Guizhou	China	2017	66 m (217 ft)	88 m (289 ft)	26.7370°N 108.4574°E
Tallest statue of Jesus	Jesus Blessed Sibea-bea		Sibea-bea, North Sumatra	Indonesia	2024	61 m (200 ft)	69 m (226 ft)	2.550703°N 98.671968°E

== Destroyed ==
Statue	Photo	Depicts	Location	Country	Height m (ft)	Completed	Destroyed	Cause of destruction	Notes	Ref
Statue of Guan Yu		Guan Yu (God of War)	Jingzhou, Hubei	China	58 m (190 ft)	2016	2022	Dismantled, pending relocation		
Great Buddha of Bamiyan		Buddha	Bamiyan Province	Afghanistan	55 m (180 ft)	554	2001	destroyed in March 2001 by the Taliban due to Islamic religious iconoclasm.		

== Under construction ==
Statue	Depicts	Photo	Location	Country	Height m (ft)	Notes	Planned completion date	Coordinates	Ref
Crazy Horse Memorial	Crazy Horse		Black Hills, South Dakota	United States	172 m (564 ft)	Construction began in 1948 and is far from completion as of 2026.	after 2037	43°50′11″N 103°37′24″W	
Phra Nang Mueang (Seated Buddha)	Gautama Buddha (First Sermon posture, "Nang Mueang")		Wat Phuttha Wanaram (Wat Pa Wang Nam Yen), Mueang Maha Sarakham District, Maha Sarakham Province	Thailand	168 m (551 ft)	A giant seated Buddha statue under construction, known as "Phra Nang Mueang" or the First Sermon posture. When completed, it will be one of the tallest Buddha statues in the world. Foundation stone was laid in November 2023, with the project led by Phra Wachirayan Wisit (Suriyan Khosapanyo).	Under construction (foundation stone laid 2023)	16°11′55″N 103°17′47″E	1 2 3
Statue of Equality (Dr. Babasaheb Ambedkar Memorial)	B. R. Ambedkar		Indu Mill compound, Mumbai, Maharashtra	India	137.3 m (450 ft)		November 2026	19.022799°N 72.832880°E	
Guanyin Bodisattva statue	Guanyin Bodhisattva		Quang Ngai	Vietnam	125 m (410 ft)	This is the tallest Buddha statue in Southeast Asia	After 2025		
Statue of Mounument of King Naresuan The Great	Naresuan		Independence Square 109 Pa Mok, Ang Thong province	Thailand	109 m (358 ft)	The pedestal for the monument to King Naresuan the Great is under construction. The steel base is awaiting concrete pouring before the construction of the 109-meter-tall statue begins. The project owner, Mr. Thawan Muangchang, aims for completion in three years.	2028 or 2029		
Statue of Buddha	Buddha		Preah Monivong National Park, Kampot Province	Cambodia	81 m (266 ft)	Stands on a 27 m (89 ft) pedestal. 108 m (354 ft) in total.	2026		
Sitting Buddha at Bodhi Tahtaung			Maha Bodhi Tahtaung, Monywa, Sagaing Division	Myanmar	74 m (243 ft)	Under construction as of May 2018		22.0754°N 95.2871°E	
Yangshan Dafo	Buddha		Urad Rear Banner, Inner Mongolia	China	69 m (226 ft)				
Grand Maitreya Project West	Maitreya Bodhisattva		Ulaanbaatar	Mongolia	54 m (177 ft)	Phase 1 completed	Project stalled in 2015.		

== See also ==
- List of statues
- List of tallest bridges
- List of tallest buildings
- List of tallest crosses
- List of tallest structures
- List of the tallest statues in India
- List of the tallest statues in Mexico
- List of the tallest statues in Sri Lanka
- List of the tallest statues in the United States
- List of tallest Hindu statues
- List of colossal sculptures in situ
- List of largest monoliths
- New 7 Wonders of the World
