= List of the tallest statues in Sri Lanka =

This list of the tallest statues in the Sri Lanka includes free-standing, completed statues in the Sri Lanka that are at least 5 meters (16 feet) tall. The height of these statues are measured from the top of its base/pedestal up to its maximum height (including monuments with spires or obelisks).

== Existing statues ==
As of 2020, this table includes the following statues with a height of 5 m (16 ft) and above.

Rank	Statue	Depicts	Locations	Year completed	Height	Notes	Coordinates
1	Buddha Statue in Kande Vihara	Lord Buddha	Aluthgama, Kalutara District	2007	48.8 m (160 ft)		06°26′56.8″N 80°00′01.0″E
2	Buddha Statue in Batamulla Kanda Buddhist Centre	Lord Buddha	Matugama, Kalutara District	2016	41.1 m (135 ft)		6.51890°N 80.11776°E
3	Buddha Statue in Wewurukannala Vihara	Lord Buddha	Dickwella, Matara District	1969	30.5 m (100 ft)		
4	Buddha Statue in Bahirawakanda Vihara	Lord Buddha	Kandy, Kandy District	1992	26.8 m (88 ft)		7°17′29.6″N 80°37′45.0″E
5	Buddha Statue in Ranawana Vihara	Lord Buddha	Pilimathalawa, Kandy District	2014	24.4 m (80 ft)		7°17′29.6″N 80°37′45.0″E
3	Buddha Statue in Weherahena Vihara	Lord Buddha	Matara, Matara District	1976	39 m (128 ft)		
7	Buddha Statue in Rambadagalla Vihara	Lord Buddha	Ridigama, Kurunegala District	2015	20.6 m (68 ft)		
8	Buddha Statue in Athugala Vihara	Lord Buddha	Kurunegala, Kurunegala District	2007	20.1 m (66 ft)		
9	Golden Buddha Statue in Dambulla Vihara	Lord Buddha	Dambulla, Matale District	2001	19.8 m (65 ft)		
10	Buddha Statue in Navakada Vihara	Lord Buddha	Udubaddawa, Kurunegala District	2010	17.1 m (56 ft)		
11	Buddha Statue in Buduruvagala	Lord Buddha	Wellawaya, Monaragala District		16 m (52 ft)		6°41′13″N 81°04′42″E
12	Avukana Buddha statue	Lord Buddha	Kekirawa, Anuradhapura District		13 m (43 ft)		8°0′39.1″N 80°30′45.6″E
13	Buddha Statue in Wathuravila Vihara	Lord Buddha	Kahaduwa, Galle District	2016	12.8 m (42 ft)		
14	Headless Buddha Statue in Lankathilaka Image House	Lord Buddha	Polonnaruwa, Polonnaruwa District		12.5 m (41 ft)		
15	Tsunami Honganji Buddha Statue	Lord Buddha	Hikkaduwa, Galle District		12.2 m (40 ft)		
16	Buddha Statue in Reswehera	Lord Buddha	Yapahuwa, Kurunegala District		12 m (39 ft)		
17	Buddha Statue in Giritale	Lord Buddha	Giritale, Polonnaruwa District		11.8 m (39 ft)		
18	Maligawila Buddha statue	Lord Buddha	Maligawila, Monaragala District		11.5 m (38 ft)		
19	Buddha statue in Dowa Vihara	Lord Buddha	Bandarawela, Badulla District		11 m (36 ft)		
20	Konanatha Swami Statue	Lord Shiva	Trincomalee, Trincomalee District	2018	9.75 m (32.0 ft)		

== Under construction ==
As of 2020, this table includes the following statues with a height of 5 m (16 ft) and above.

Rank	Statue	Depicts	Locations	Year to be completed	Height	Notes	Coordinates
1	Koralima Budhdha Statue	Lord Buddha	Horana, Kalutara District		26.8 m (88 ft)		
2	Working Budhdha Statue in Mahiyangana Vihara	Lord Buddha	Mahiyangana, Badulla District		25.6 m (84 ft)		07°19′19.4″N 80°59′26.9″E
3	Budhdha Statue in Abhaya Wewa	Lord Buddha	Anuradhapura, Anuradhapura District	2022	12.3 m (40 ft)		08°21′07.9″N 080°23′17.4″E

== See also ==
- List of tallest statues
