= Dai Kannon of Kita no Miyako park =

Statue in Ashibetsu, Hokkaido, Japan

- 北海道大観音
- Interactive map of Dai Kannon of Kita no Miyako park
- Location: Ashibetsu, Hokkaido, Japan
- Coordinates: 43°31′41″N 142°11′52″E
- Type: statue
- Height: 88 metres (289 ft)
- Completion date: 1989

The Dai Kannon of Kita no Miyako park (Japanese: 北海道大観音, Hepburn: Hokkaidō Daikannon), also known as the Hokkaido Kannon, as well as the Byakue Kannon, is the third-tallest statue in Japan and is the tenth-tallest statue in the world, tied with the Grand Buddha at Ling Shan. It was the tallest statue in the world when it opened in 1989 at 88 metres (289 ft), holding the world record until 1991.

Planning of the statue began in 1975 and construction occurred through 1989. The statue depicts Guanyin (Avalokiteśvara) and is in the Kita no Miyako park on the island of Hokkaido. The statue contains over 20 floors with an elevator, with floors containing shrines and places of worship, eight in total, and a platform providing a panoramic view of the area to visitors.

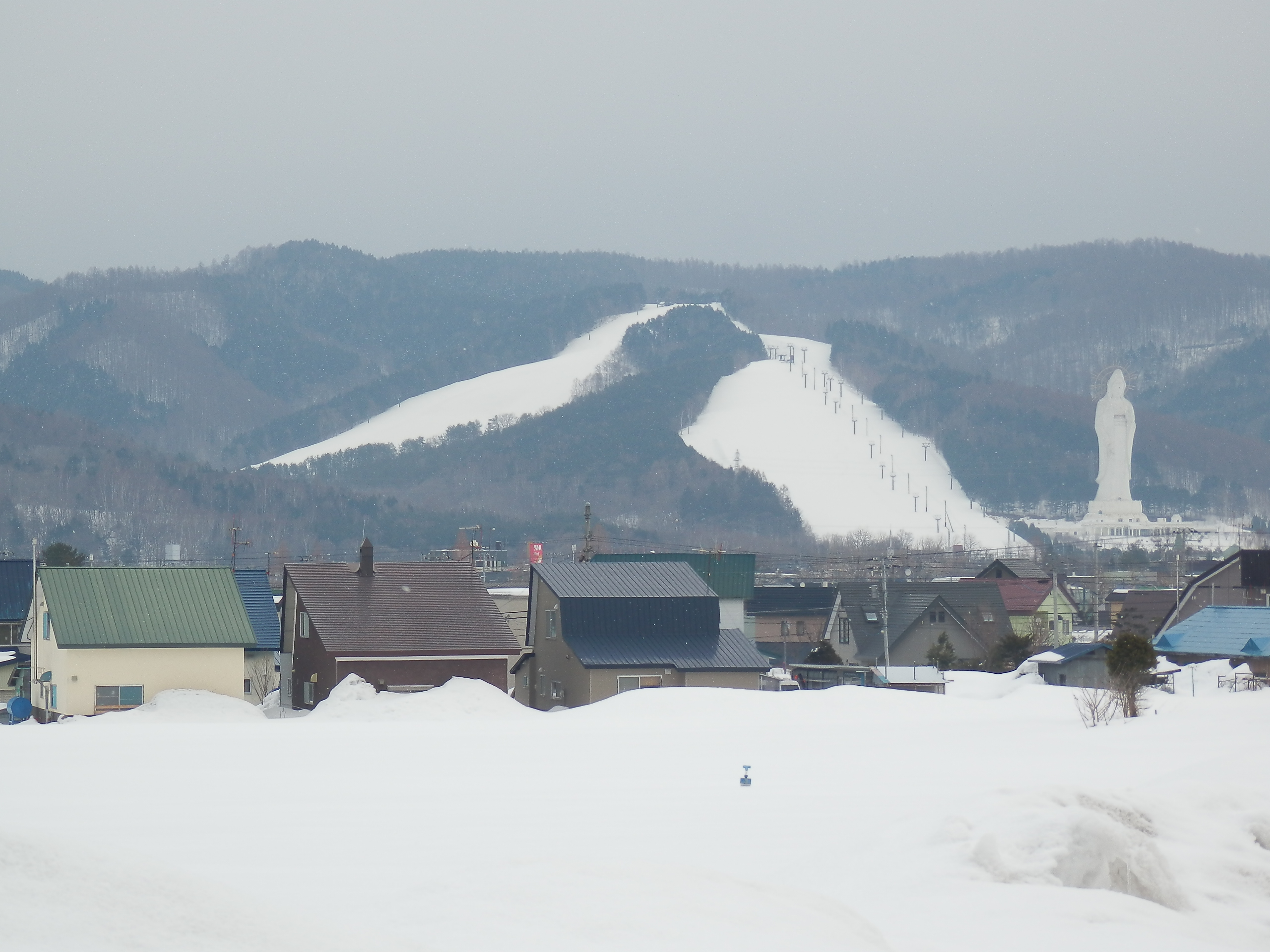
City of Ashibetsu with the statue in the background

== See also ==
- Ashibetsu
- Buddhism
- Buddhist art
- Kannon
- List of tallest statues

Records
Preceded by The Motherland Calls; 85 m (279 ft)	World's tallest statue 1989–1991	Succeeded by Sendai Daikannon; 92 m (302 ft)
