= Lingshan Buddhist Palace =

Coordinates: 31.4303°N 120.0974°E

Lingshan Buddhist Scenic Spot
- 靈山梵宮
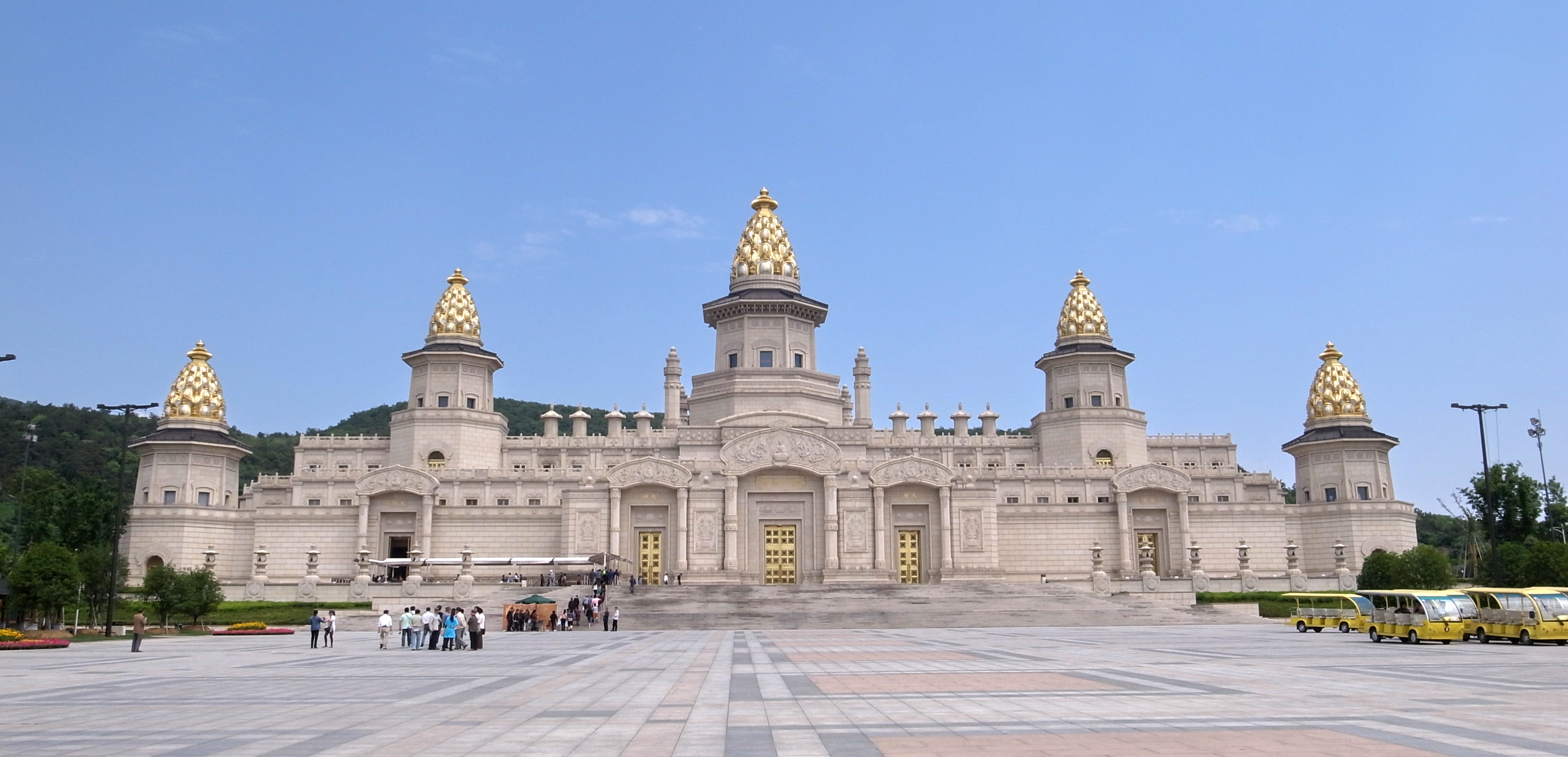
- Interactive map of the Lingshan Buddhist Scenic Spot area

General information
- Location: No. 1 Lingshan Road, Wuxi City, Jiangsu Province, China
- Construction started: September 2006
- Completed: August 2008
- Opened: January 1, 2009
- Renovated: November 15, 2017
- Owner: Chinese Government

Technical details
- Material: Stone
- Floor area: 72,000 square meters

Design and construction
- Other designers: Shanghai Xian Dai Architectural Design (Group) Co., Ltd

The Lingshan Buddhist Palace (Chinese: 靈山梵宮) is a Buddhist architectural complex located in Wuxi, Jiangsu Province, China. It is situated adjacent to the Lingshan Grand Buddha. This area covers an area of approximately 70,000 square meters. The total cost of building the palace was approximately ¥2.6 billion, which is roughly $380 million USD at the time of completion. The palace is part of the National 5A Tourist Attraction known as the Lingshan Scenic Area and was built as the third phase of the overall development project.

== Gallery ==
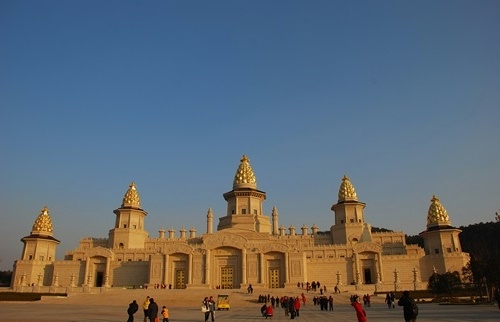
Exterior of Lingshan Buddha Palace

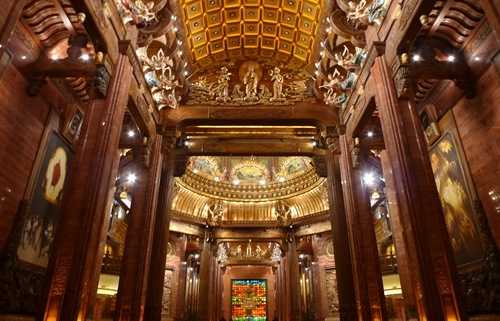
Inside Lingshan Buddha Temple

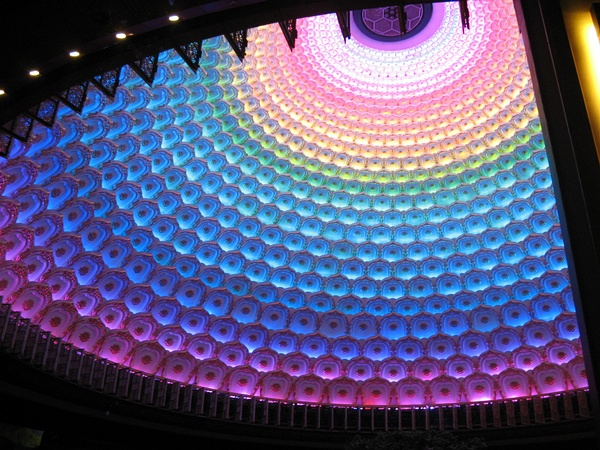
Dome of the Palace

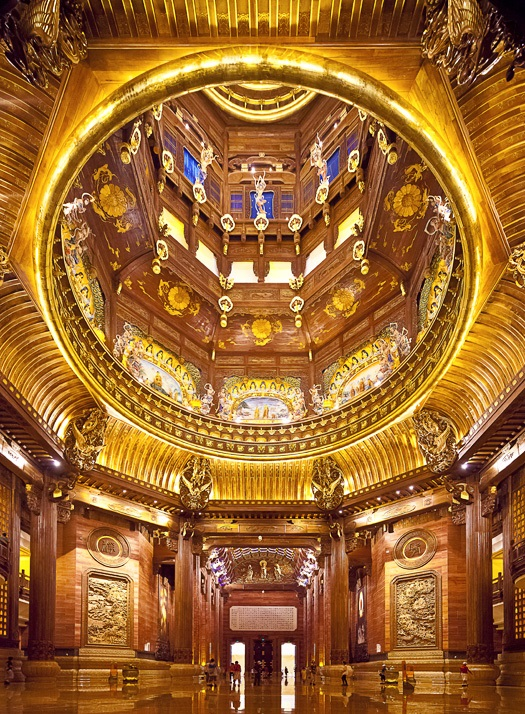
Inside the Palace

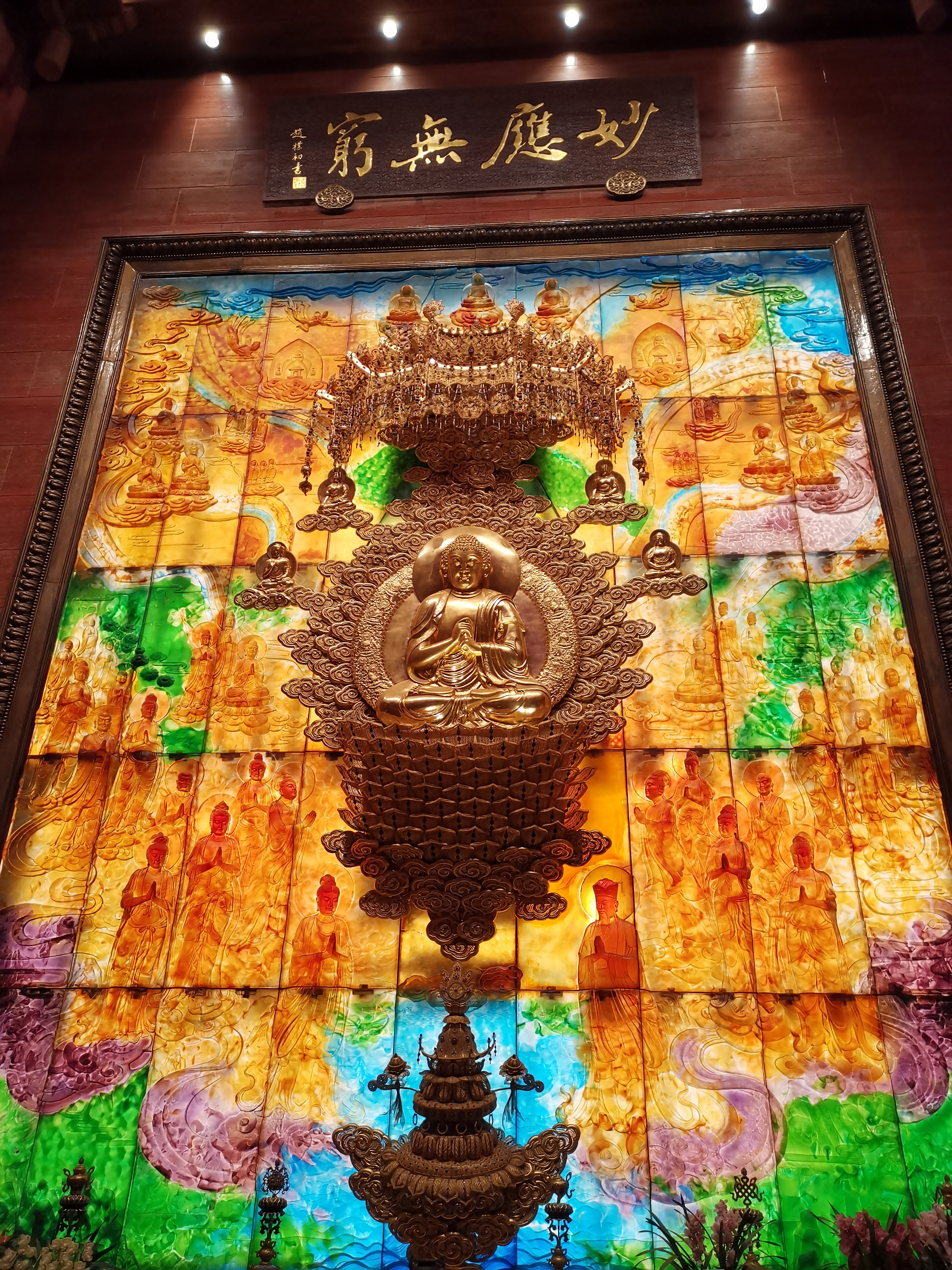
Statue of Buddha
