= Sayadaw U Narada =

Burmese Theravada Buddhist monk (1931–2006)

Shin Narada
- ရှင်နာရဒ
- Title: Maha Bodhi Sayadaw Agga Mahā Saddhamma Jotika Dhaja U Nãrada

Personal life
- Born: Toe Kywe; 31 January 1931 Ywa-kyat village, Sagaing, British Burma
- Died: 22 November 2006 (aged 75) Mandalay, Myanmar
- Occupation: Buddhist monk

Religious life
- Religion: Buddhism
- School: Theravada
- Dharma name: Narāda နာရဒ

Senior posting
- Based in: Maha Bodhi Ta Htaung

Sayadaw U Narada (born Toe Kywe; 31 January 1931 – 22 November 2006) was the founding sayadaw (chief abbot) of Maha Bodhi Ta Htaung, who planted many thousands of Bodhi trees, built thousands of pagodas and Buddha statues, including the Standing Buddha Statue, Reclining Buddha Image and Aung Sakkya Pagoda.

== Childhood ==
Narada was born Toe Kywe at 4 am on 31 January 1931 (the 14th Waxing of Tabodwe 1292 ME) to parents U Tun Myat and Daw Saw Myaing in Ywa-kyat village (now Shwedwingon village) in Ayadaw Township (previously Tabayin Township), Sagaing Region.

He was with placenta across his shoulder and two upper eye teeth when born.

At the age of five, he started to study Buddhist literature under Koesu Kyaung U Suneyya, the first cousin of his mother. He worked hard his studies, and was patient, polite, kind and peaceful.

== Novicehood ==
At the age of 13, he was initiated into a novicehood under the patronage of Abbot U Suneyya. His Dhamma name was Shin Narada.

== Buddhist ordination ==
On 26 June 1950 (10th Waxing of First Waso 1312 ME), Narada received higher ordination under the patronage of Abbot U Suneyya at Koesu Monastery's Khanda Ordination hall under the sponsorship of U Htein and Daw Thant of Abhaya village in Dabanyin Township.

== Study of Buddhist literature ==
He studied Buddhist literature at famous monasteries in Monywa, Chaung-U, Pakokku and Mandalay Townships for 14 years. He picked up tuberculosis pursuing education in Maha Visutarama Monastery in Pakokku. He received treatment at Pakokku Hospital and Mandalay Hospital. However, he was not getting well. So, he met with Venerable Nan-U Monk with the arrangements of U Maung Ko.

He continued his study of Buddhist literature under Venerable Nan-U Monk and practiced tranquility meditation and insight meditation (vipassana). After residing together with Venerable Nan-U Monk, he returned to Koesu Monastery.

On the full moon Day of Tabaung 1318 ME, he made a trip with Ba Chit (his attendant or kappiya) to Myayeik. There, they found an 18-cubit-high Buddha image and a 13-cubit-high Buddha image while excavating the ground on a hill. Then, the Buddha image became well known as Pawdawmu (strangely excavated) Mya Yeik Buddha Image, and Shin Narada, as "Pawdawmu Kodawlay" (lit. 'young monk who had excavated the images') and as Yaykodawlay since it rained in just Myayeik and Ywa-kyat village after he had excavated them. Moreover, an earthquake occurred while excavating, so they did not excavate hardly.

== Establishment of Bodhi Tahtaung ==
After he had been a monk for ten years, his uncle Abbot U N´eya of Khatakkan (South) Village Monastery died; he moved to the monastery at the invitation of laypersons and resided there as the abbot. On the 11th Waxing of Kason 1322 ME, he conveyed 27 Bo tree saplings from Koesu Monastery. At 8.55 am the following day, together with Venerable Nan-U Monk, he planted the 27 Bo saplings.

The Bodhi Tahtaung site has grown from its original 15 acres (0.061 km²) to 250 acres (1.0 km²). It now contains more than 9,000 Bo trees. Because of the project, the monk who started it became known both locally and internationally as the Bodhi Tahtaung Sayadaw, which means the "One Thousand Bo Trees Monk.

== Death ==
He died in Mandalay on 22 November 2006 (the 3rd Waxing of Nadaw 1368 ME).

== Teachings ==
- Be sympathetic; Others, like you, want to be rich. Do not seek self-interest at the expense of others' interests. Others, like you, have to struggle to earn their living. Do not earn your living at the expense of others' interests.
- Forget them not; It is food that you are not content with although you eat every day. It is a speech that you cannot deliver properly although you speak every day. It is Dhamma (Universal Truth) that you do not realize although it exists really. Mental sufferings cause physical ones. Without a calm mind, your soul and body cannot be in harmony. You should try your best to keep your mind calm. Have mindfulness whatever you do.
- Man good for nothing; Perform at least a meritorious deed a day. Do not stay idle. If you do, you will be the one good for nothing.
- Door to Nibbana; To open the door to Nibbana, do charity firstly and observe the Precepts. Then, contemplate Attributes of the Triple Gems. And then, practice insight meditation.
- Ways to prosperity; Surely, you will enjoy a promising future if you have a strong desire and hard work. Surely, you will enjoy a promising future if you are patient and tolerant. Earn money and practice thrifty. Spend money expeditiously and live in a suitable place.
- Four causes of ruin; No repair to damaged things, failure to search what has been lost, extravagance, and stupidity, they are four causes of ruin.
- Our Task; Be patient, persevering, and tolerant. Go on practicing, and exert efforts. This is our task.
- The gift of Bodhi Tahtaung; Want to be rich? Have goodwill. Want to be poor? Have an ill will. Mindlessness leads one to hell. These words constitute the gift of Bodhi Tahtaung.
- Three good things; Try to do the three good things- Do good deeds; Say good words; Think good thoughts. So, good deeds, good speech, and good thoughts are your guide.
- Three Don'ts; Never do, say or think anything that is harmful to others.
- Three Do's; There are three do's you need to practice. They are; Find light in the dark; Stay clean and clear in a mess; Keep cool in the heat.
- The beneficiary; You are the one who will reap the fruits of your deeds, good or bad.
- Good will; One will be lucky if one has goodwill. One will be unlucky if one has an ill will. Only a man of goodwill wins good friends.
- Attitude; It is a big mistake to think too little of others. One will make enemies if one is rude. There may be those who do not like you. But don't let them hate you. You will have peace of mind instantly if you are free from envy and jealousy.
- Do not get depressed; You will hurt your body if you are in despair. You will feel tired if you are in distress. It does not matter if you are tired physically. Do not get depressed.
- He who always cultivates mindfulness attains Nibbana. He who does not cultivate mindfulness is born and dies endlessly. Lord Buddha delivered a discourse time and again, mindfulness should be cultivated at all times.
- Remain calm in the face of vicissitudes
  - You acquire one thing or another. But, do not be conceited for what you have got.
  - You lose one thing or another. But, do not feel downhearted.
  - You get acquainted with one person or another. But, do not be conceited for whom you have got acquainted with.
  - You will be hated by one person or another. But, do not feel offended for being hated.
  - You will come under criticism of one person or another. But, do not feel downhearted.
  - You receive praise from one person or another. But, do not be conceited for being praised.
  - You sometimes feel happy with something. But, do not be conceited.
  - You sometimes feel unhappy with something. But, do not feel downhearted.
