= 温泉 (disambiguation) =

温泉, meaning hot spring, may refer to:

- Onsen, Japanese hot springs
  - Onsen District, Ehime
- Wenquan County (温泉县), of the Bortala Mongol Autonomous Prefecture, Xinjiang

== See also ==
- Wenquan (disambiguation)
