= Awaji Kannon =

Demolished statue on Awaji Island, Japan

Dai Kannon of Awaji
- 平和観音寺（へいわかんのんじ）
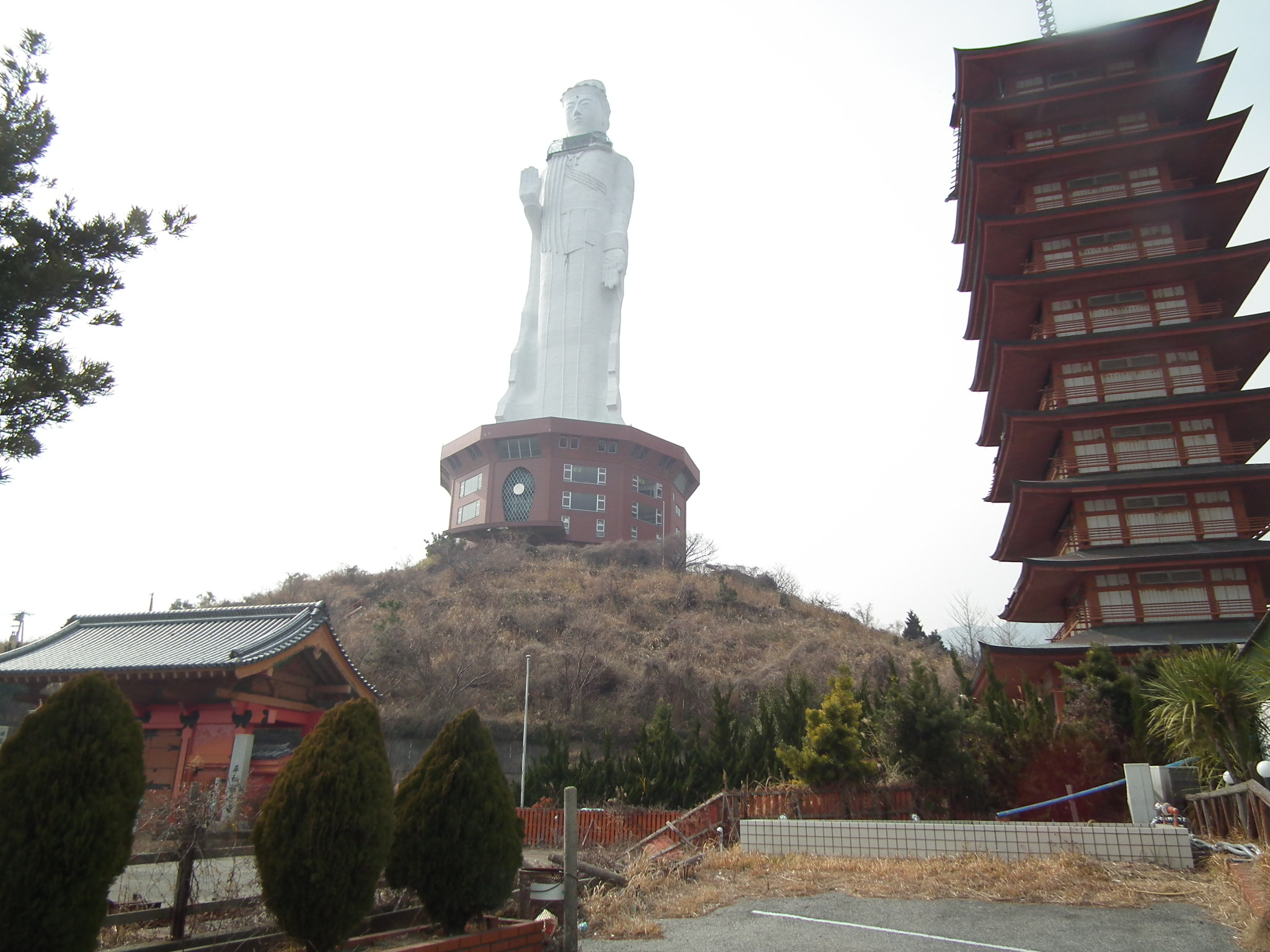
- Interactive map of Dai Kannon of Awaji
- Location: Awaji Island, Hyogo Prefecture, Japan
- Coordinates: 34.5029°N 134.9767°E
- Type: statue, museum, and temple
- Height: 80 m (260 ft)
- Opening date: 1982
- Dedicated to: Kannon
- Demolished: 2023

Awaji Kannon, or World Peace Giant Kannon, was a large gypsum statue, museum and temple complex on Awaji Island, Hyogo Prefecture, Japan. The statue, which was one of the tallest in the world, had an observation deck at the top. It opened in 1982. Despite high numbers of visitors when it first opened, the statue fell into disrepair and was closed in 2006. Locals believed it was haunted. Sixteen years later, the Japanese government announced it would demolish the statue after acquiring the site in 2022. Site work was completed by March 2023.

== Description ==
Awaji Kannon was the dream of real estate magnate Toyokichi Okuuchi. Construction on the statue and its base started in 1977 and took five years to complete. It sat on a 5-story pedestal building that was 20 metres (66 ft) tall. There was also a sixth-floor observation deck within the statue. Okuchi managed the building until his death in 1988. His wife continued to manage and operate the statue complex up until her death in 2006. The site was closed after a structural inspection showed that the gypsum statue was in great need of repair.

During the 2012 and 2014 typhoon seasons, part of the outer wall of the gypsum statue was damaged. By February 2020, unease among the local population had increased over concerns about the structure's safety as well as an incident where a person committed suicide by jumping from the observation deck. This prompted the Japanese government to acquire the statue and the surrounding land by eminent domain in March 2020. In April 2020, it was announced that the crumbling statue and its complex would be demolished. The ¥880 million Yen (US$6.8 million) job to clear the site was completed in early 2023.

== See also ==
- List of tallest statues
