= Naritasan Kurume Bunin =

Buddhist temple in Kurume, Fukuoka, Japan

Kurume Narita-san 久留米成田山
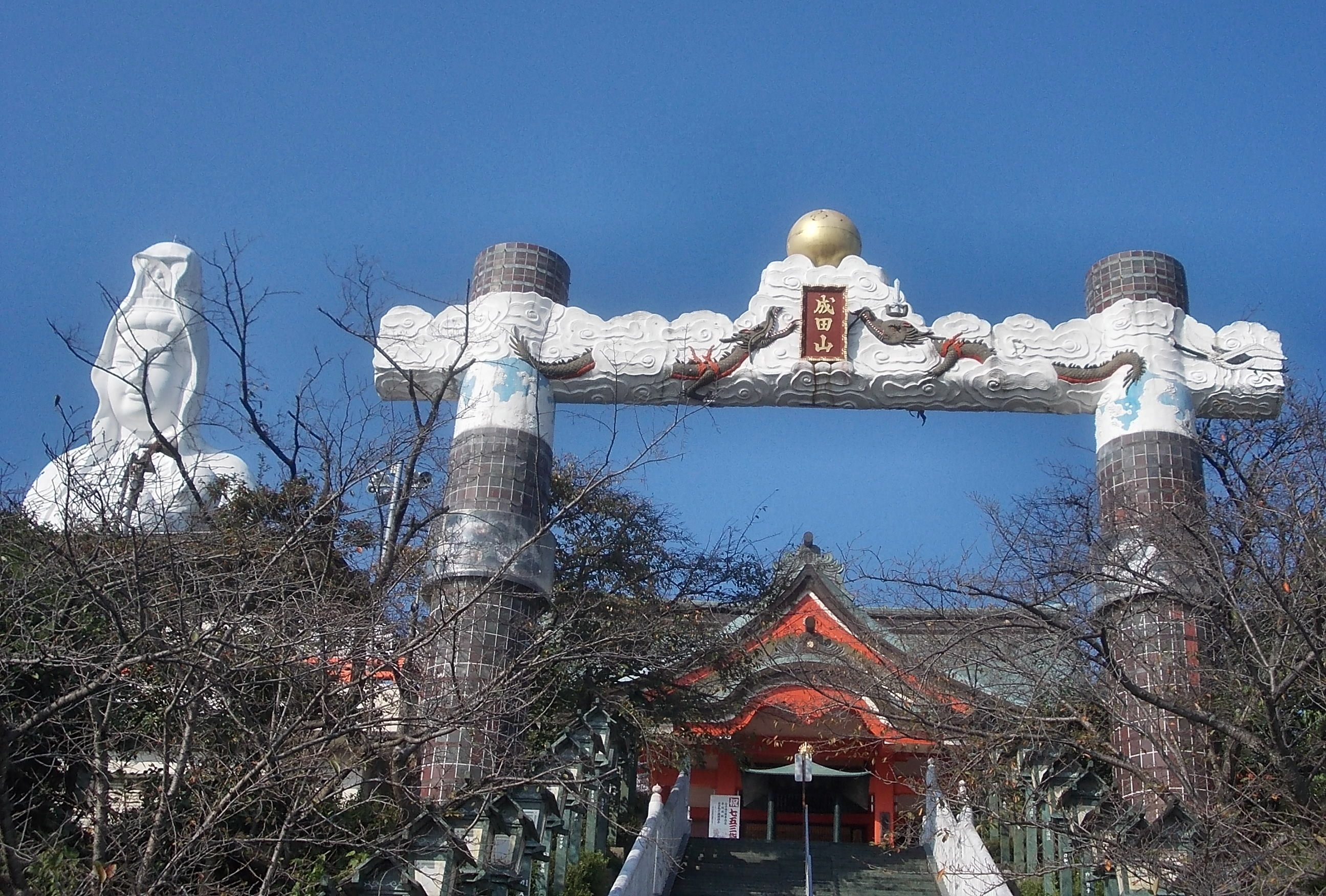
- Jibo Kannon statue with the Stupa of Hell and Paradise in view

Religion
- Affiliation: Shingon

Location
- Location: 1386-22 Kamitsu-machi, Kurume-shi, Fukuoka prefecture
- Country: Japan
- Interactive map of Kurume Narita-san 久留米成田山
- Coordinates: 33°17′5.8″N 130°32′6.8″E

Architecture
- Completed: 1958

Website
- http://www.kurume-naritasan.or.jp/

Naritasan Kurume Bunin (成田山久留米分院) or Kurume Narita-san (久留米成田山) is a Shingon Buddhist temple in Kurume, Fukuoka Prefecture, Japan. It is a direct branch of Narita-san Shinshō-ji in Narita, Chiba Prefecture.

== Founding ==
The temple was established in 1958 after part of the spiritual embodiment from the Narita-san Shinshō-ji Temple which is well-known throughout Japan for housing Fudō myōō (Ācala) was given to it.

== Jibo Kannon ==
The Jibo Kannon of the Jeweled Gates of Good Fortune is the fourth tallest statue in Japan, and the twenty-fourth tallest in the world. This birch bronze monument depicting Avalokitesvara stands 62 metres (203 ft) tall. The temple was spending ¥2 billion (approximately $50 million) to build a large statue of Kannon and the work was completed in 1982.

The dot on her forehead is a gold plate 30 centimetres in diameter encrusted with 18 three-carat diamonds, and her ornamental necklace contains an arrangement of a crystal and 56 jade stones. The baby she cradles is 13 metres (43 ft) long.

Visitors take a spiral staircase to the platform providing a panoramic view of the area, as far as Mount Unzen in the distance.

== The Hell and Paradise Museum ==
The Hell and Paradise Museum (Gokuraku-den (極楽殿)), a replica of Mahabodhi Temple in Bodh Gaya, India, is built on the temple grounds. It features dramatic, graphic recreations of scenes showing Buddhist heaven and hell.

== Access ==
From Nishitetsu Kurume Station, board a bus towards Yame Eigyōshō. Get off the bus at "Kamitsu Machi", approximately 15 minutes from the train station.

== Gallery ==
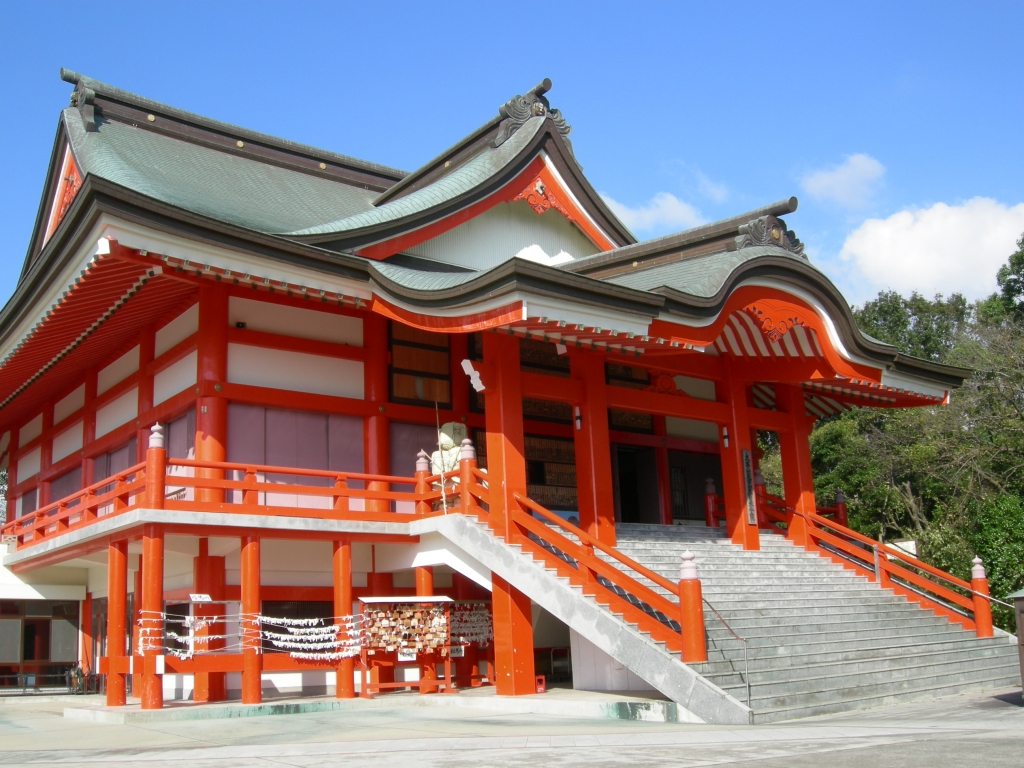
Main hall

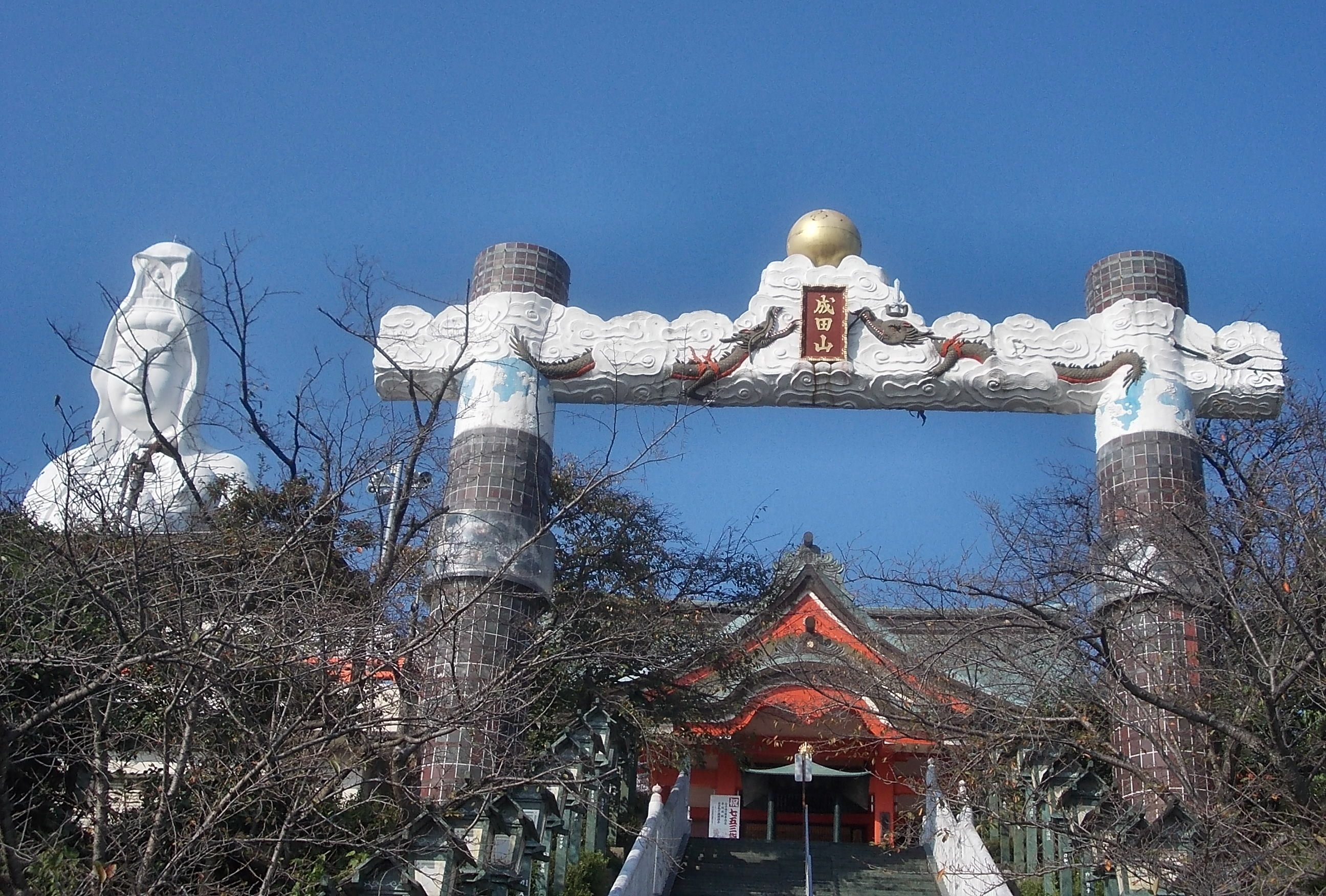
Sanmon with the statue in the background

== See also ==
- List of tallest statues
- Narita-san Shinshō-ji
