= Sendai Daikannon =

Large Buddhist statue in Sendai, Japan

- 仙台大観音
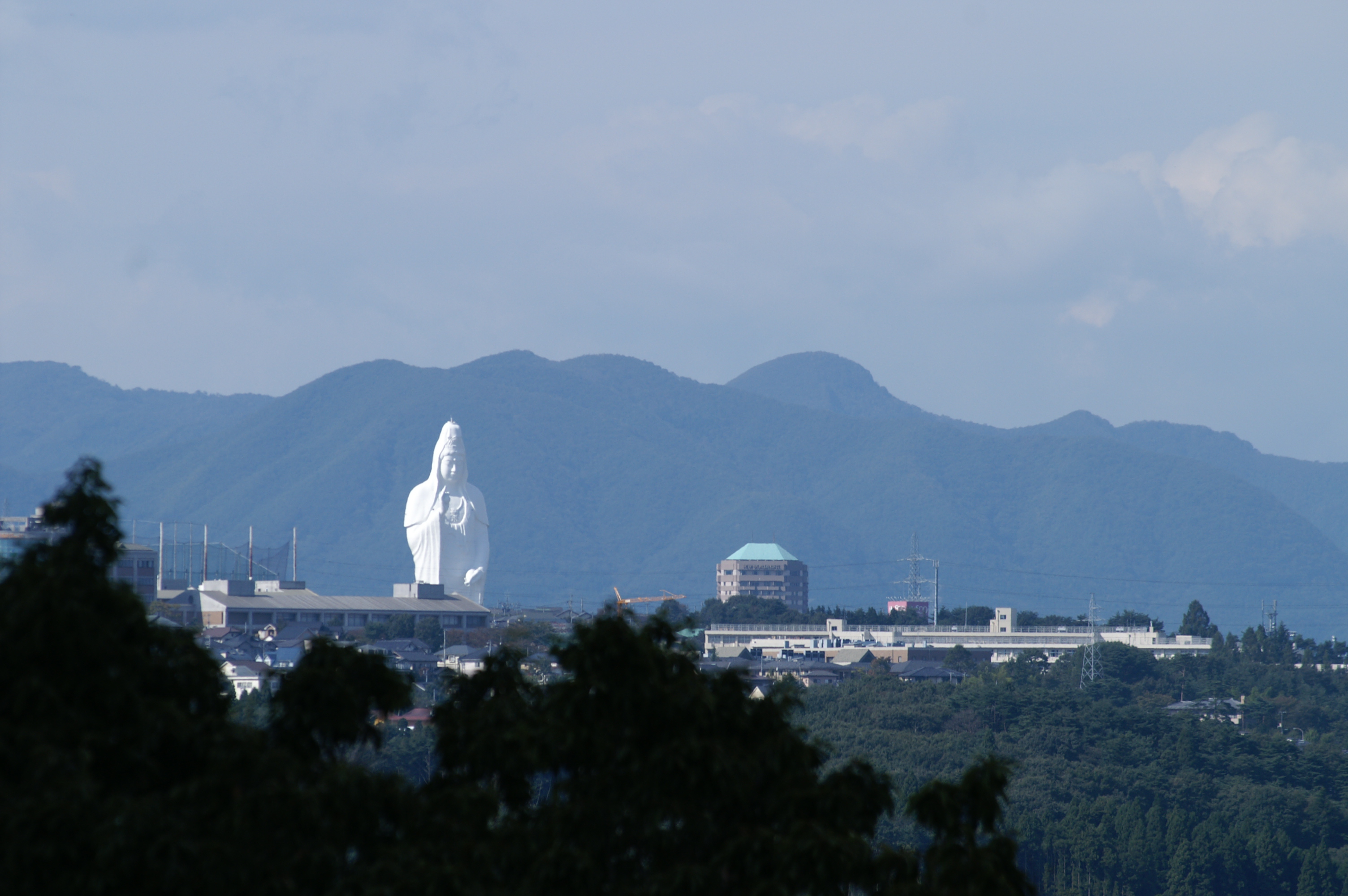
- Remote view of Sendai Daikannon
- Interactive map of Sendai Daikannon
- Location: Sendai, Japan
- Coordinates: 38.3005°N 140.8236°E
- Type: Statue
- Height: Statue: 92 m (302 ft); Including base: 100 m (330 ft)
- Completion date: 1 September 1991
- Dedicated to: Byakue Kannon (白衣観音)
- daikannon.com

Sendai Daikannon (Japanese: 仙台大観音, Hepburn: Sendai Daikannon), officially known as the Sendai Tendou Byakue Daikannon (仙台天道白衣大観音), is a large statue located in Sendai, Japan. It portrays a woman, the bodhisattva Byakue Kannon (白衣観音; "white-robed Kannon") holding the cintamani gem (如意宝珠, Nyoihōju) in her hand.

It is the tallest statue of a goddess in Japan and the tenth-tallest statue in the world, at 100 metres (330 ft). The monument itself is 92 m (302 ft) tall, while the pedestal brings its total height to 100 m (330 ft). At the time of its completion in 1991, it was the tallest statue in the world, but it was surpassed by Ushiku Daibutsu in 1993.

There is a small entry fee to enter the statue itself. Inside, on the first floor, there are many large statues of Buddha and mythical kings. Visitors take an elevator to the 12th level then walk down the stairs and ramps to the ground. At each level, there are eight Buddhas displayed in wood cabinets, 108 in total.

== See also ==
- Guanyin of the South Sea
- List of tallest statues

Records
Preceded by Dai Kannon of Kita no Miyako park 88 m (289 ft)	World's tallest statue 1991–1993	Succeeded by Ushiku Daibutsu; 100 m (330 ft)
