= Wenquan =

Wenquan (Chinese: 温泉; pinyin: Wēnquán; lit. 'hot spring') is a common name for places in the People's Republic of China:

== County ==
- Wenquan County (温泉县), of the Bortala Mongol Autonomous Prefecture, Xinjiang

== Towns (温泉镇) ==
- Wenquan, Anhui, in Yuexi County
- Wenquan, Beijing, in Haidian District
- Wenquan, Chongqing, in Kai County
- Wenquan, Guangdong, in Conghua
- Wenquan, Luchuan County, Guangxi
- Wenquan, Guiyang, in Xifeng County, Guizhou
- Wenquan, Suiyang County, Guizhou
- Wenquan, Ruzhou, Henan
- Wenquan, Jiaozuo, Wen County, Henan
- Wenquan, Huanggang, Yingshan County, Hubei
- Wenquan, Donghai County, Jiangsu
- Wenquan, Fuzhou, Jiangxi, in Linchuan District
- Wenquan, Tonggu County, Jiangxi
- Wenquan, Xingzi County, Jiangxi
- Wenquan, Mian County, Shaanxi
- Wenquan, Jimo, Shandong
- Wenquan, Weihai, in Huancui District, Weihai, Shandong

== Townships (温泉乡) ==
- Wenquan Township, Qingyang, in Xifeng District, Qingyang, Gansu
- Wenquan Township, Tianshui, in Wushan County, Gansu
- Wenquan Township, Qinghai, in Xinghai County
- Wenquan Township, Jiaokou County, Shanxi
- Wenquan Township, Kelan County, Shanxi
- Wenquan Township, Yunnan, in Changning County

== Subdistricts (温泉街道) ==
- Wenquan Subdistrict, Fuzhou, in Gulou District, Fuzhou, Fujian
- Wenquan Subdistrict, Xianning, in Xian'an District, Xianning, Hubei
- Wenquan Subdistrict, Arxan, Inner Mongolia
- Wenquan Subdistrict, Xingcheng, Liaoning
- Wenquan Subdistrict, Zhaoyuan, Shandong
- Wenquan Subdistrict, Anning, Yunnan

== Smaller localities ==
- Wenquan, Golmud, a locality in Golmud County, Qinghai, near the border with Tibet

== Other uses ==
- Li Wenquan (李文全), archer

== See also ==
- 温泉 (disambiguation)
