= Maha Bodhi Tahtaung =

Notable Buddhist site in Sagaing, Myanmar

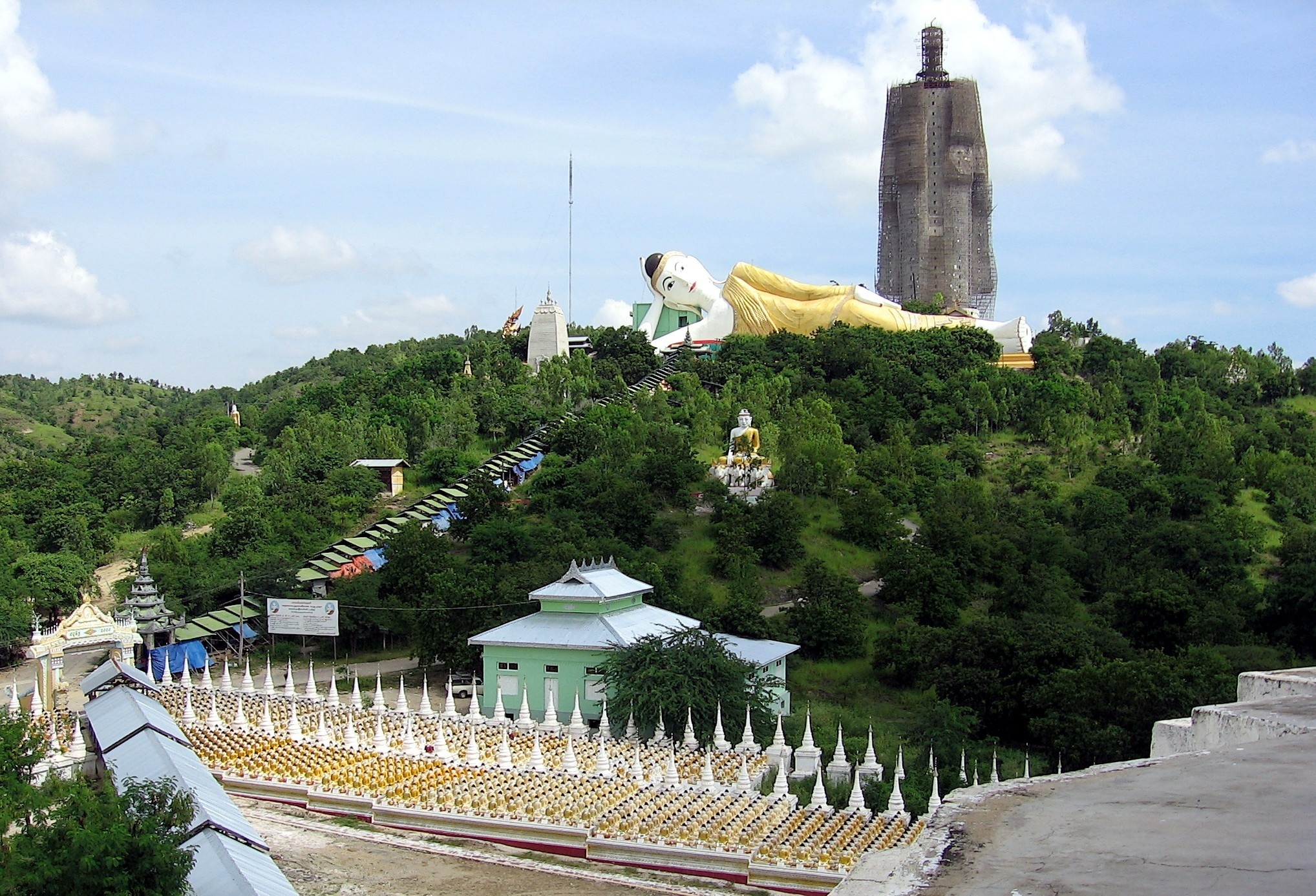
- Taken from Monywa Township

- Location within Myanmar

Religion
- Affiliation: Buddhism
- Rite: Theravada
- Ecclesiastical or organizational status: Buddhist temple
- Status: Active

Location
- Location: Monywa Township, Sagaing Region
- Country: Myanmar
- Interactive map of Maha Bodhi Tahtaung
- Coordinates: 22.080199°N 95.289186°E

Architecture
- Founder: U Narada
- Completed: 5 May 1960; 66 years ago

Maha Bodhi Ta Htaung (Burmese: မဟာဗောဓိတထောင်, lit. 'a thousand great Bo trees') is a Buddhist religious complex located in Monywa Township, Sagaing Region, Myanmar (Burma). It is known for the Giant Standing Buddha statue, the third tallest in the world, and for the Great Attitudes of U Narãda, who built the monastery. This Sāsana (religious) site contains thousands of Buddha statues beneath thousands of Bo trees, the Giant Reclining Buddha Statue, Aung Sekkya Stupa, and other large Buddha statues. Currently, a Sitting Buddha Statue, which is expected to become the world's largest Sitting Buddha Statue, is in construction. Many Buddhist monks can study the Buddhist Pariyatti literature at the monastery. Moreover, meditation centres or Vipassãnā centres are opened at this monastic site both for monks and laypersons.

== History ==
Maha Bodhi Ta Htaung was founded by Maha Bodhi Ta Htaung Sayadaw Ven Nārada on 5 May 1960. He planted thousands of Bo trees throughout his life on recalling the Buddha attained beneath the Bo tree in Bodh Gaya, India. He started to plant them on a 15 acres (6.1 ha) plot, with Nan Oo Sayadaw, the grandson of King Mindon, at 8.55 AM on 6 May 1960. Bo trees hold religious significance for Buddhists since it is the tree under which Buddha attained enlightenment.

Before he reached this monastery, the monastery was just a small one for Khatakkan villagers. Now, the 15 acres (0.061 km^{2}) Bodhi Ta Htaung (One Thousand Bo Trees) Auspicious Ground has been extended to a 250 acres (1.0 km^{2}) area that has more than 9,000 Bo trees. The monastery is noted in Myanmar and around the world for its many thousands of Bodhi trees.

== Laykyun Sekkya statue ==
Laykyun Sekkya and the Reclining Buddha

Built in 1995, the Laykyun Sekkya Buddha statue is 116 m (381 ft) high with thirty one floors, referring to the 31 planes of existence or 31 Realms of Life Cycle according to Buddhist literatures. The mural paintings in every floor for each Realm are very interesting and famous. The pedestal is 13.5 m (44 ft) high. It is the second-tallest Buddha statue in the world after the Spring Temple Buddha in China. Construction of the statue was finished in 2008. On Banda vah mountain in Bodhi Tahtaung monastery, a Sitting Buddha statue is also being built for completing the last desire of Sayadawgyi, U Nārada.

== Reclining Buddha Statue ==
The Reclining Buddha Statue was built on 8 January 1991. It has a length of 101.5 m (333 ft) and a width of 18.3 m (60 ft). It is hollow inside the statue and the Great Chronicles of Buddha are displayed.

== Aung Sekkya Pagoda ==
Built in 1979, the Aung Sekkya was modeled after the Shwedagon pagoda in Yangon. At 69 m (226 ft), the pagoda is about two thirds the size of the Shwedagon. People can walk up the outside stairs or walk through the hollow walkway inside the stupa in to the dome of the stupa.

== Leadership ==
The site is led by a chief abbot known as a sayadaw. The founding abbot, Ven. Narada, died in Mandalay on 22 November 2006. Since his demise, five Chief sayadaws have succeeded him as the Nāyaka Sayadaws according to his will.
