= Laykyun Sekkya =

Monument in Khatakan Taung, Myanmar

- လေးကျွန်းစကြာ
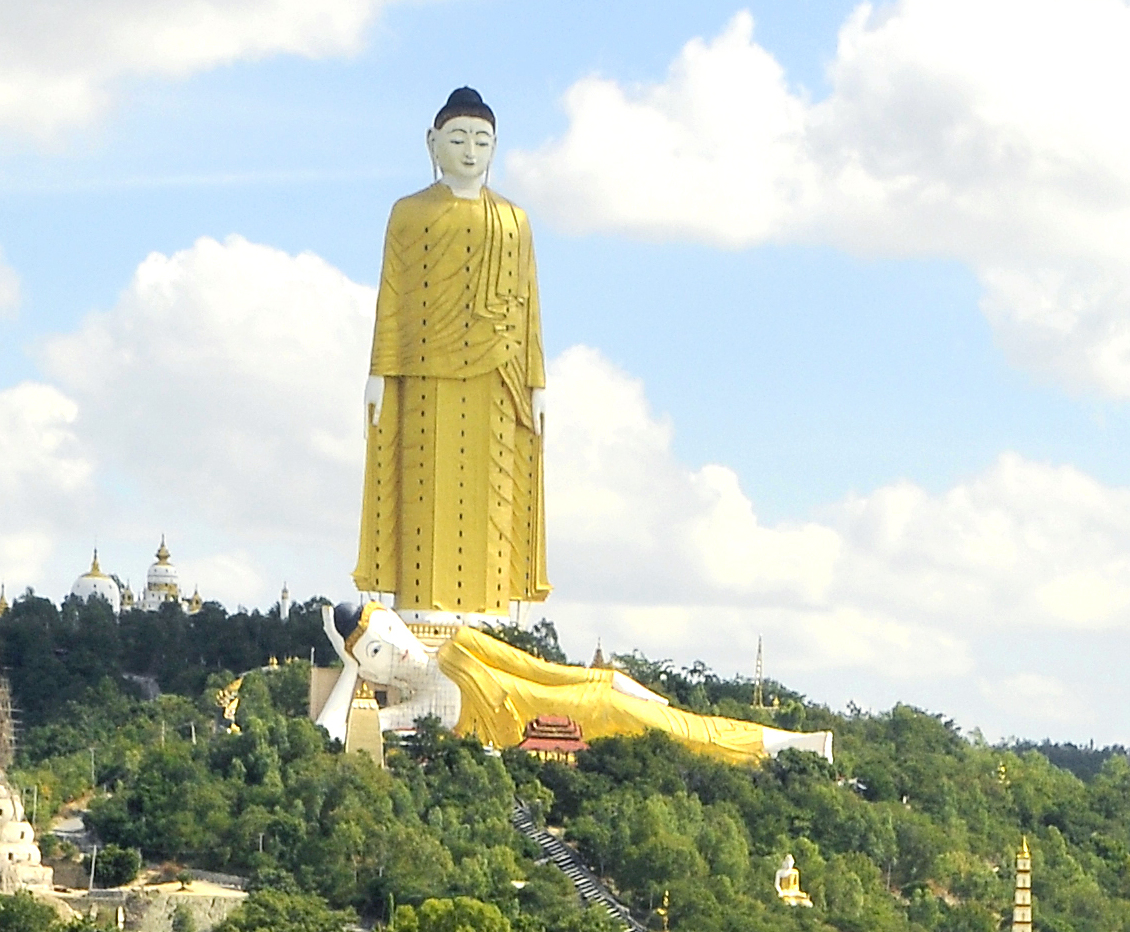
- Interactive map of Laykyun Sekkya
- Location: Khatakan Taung, near Monywa, Myanmar
- Coordinates: 22°04′49″N 95°17′22″E
- Type: image
- Height: statue: 116 metres (381 ft); including base: 129.2 metres (424 ft)
- Beginning date: 1996
- Completion date: 21 February 2008

The Laykyun Sekkya Buddha (Burmese: လေးကျွန်းစကြာ) is a colossal statue depicting the Buddha which is located at the Monywa town of Sagaing Region. As of May 2026, it is the third-tallest statue in the world at 116 metres (381 ft).

== Details ==
This statue of Gautama Buddha stands on a 115.8-metre (380 ft) throne located in the village of Khatakan Taung, near Monywa, Myanmar. Construction began in 1996 and it was completed on 21 February 2008. It was commissioned by the Chief Abbot Ven. Nãradã. It was the tallest statue in the world for a few months until the completion of the Spring Temple Buddha in September 2008. The Laykyun Sekkya statue depicts a standing Gautama Buddha next to a reclining statue of Gautama Buddha, depicting the scene of Mahaparinirvana (Mahaparinibbana).

== See also ==
- List of tallest statues
- Chaukhtatgyi Buddha Temple
- Maha Bodhi Tahtaung

== Gallery ==
Laykyun Sekkya and Reclining Buddha

The Laykyun Sekkya

Records
Preceded by Ushiku Daibutsu; 100 m (330 ft)	World's tallest statue 2008	Succeeded by Spring Temple Buddha; 128 m (420 ft)
