= Statue of Gautama Buddha (Myanmar) =

Large Buddha statue in Myanmar

- ထိုင်တော်မူ ဂေါတမဗုဒ္ဓ ရုပ်ပွားတော်ဘုရားကြီး
- Statue of Gautama Buddha
- Location: Kyaikto, Myanmar
- Coordinates: 17.3183733°N 97.0281018°E
- Type: Buddha statue
- Height: 255.5 ft (77.9 m)
- Completion date: 2019
- Opening date: April 7, 2019
- Dedicated to: Buddha

The Statue of Gautama Buddha (Burmese: ထိုင်တော်မူ ဂေါတမဗုဒ္ဓ ရုပ်ပွားတော်ဘုရားကြီး) is a 255.5 ft (77.9 m) seated statue in Kyaikto, a city in Mon State, Myanmar. The opening ceremony for the completed statue was held on April 6–7th, 2019, which also coincided with Myanmar's Buddha's Birthday festival.

The statue's pagoda has seventeen floors, and the height of 255 feet and 6 inches was specifically chosen because the statue was set to be completed in the Buddhist calendar year of 2556. The pagoda includes an elevator as well as a cooking area that provides free meals to pilgrims to the statue.

== See also ==
- List of tallest statues
