= Yang Asha =

Chinese deity

Yang Asha (Chinese: 仰阿莎; also spelt Yang’asha) is a goddess of beauty, worshipped by Miao people. She serves as a tribute to the rich culture of the local people.

== Legend ==
According to local legend, Yang Asha is a beautiful woman. She was deceived to marry the sun because of the lies of the dark clouds. However, soon after the wedding, the sun left and went to the East China Sea. Yang Asha endured the absence of the sun for six years. Some time later, she and Chang Gongyue, the moon and brother of the sun, fell in love. The two decided to elope, escaping to the horizon. After a lot of twists and turns, the two eventually lived a happy life.

== Legacy ==
- In 2008, Yang Asha got included to the Intangible cultural heritage by the UNESCO.
- The 88-metre-high stainless steel statue depicting Yang Asha was built in Jianhe County in China in 2017. It is her largest statue in the world.
