= Ushiku Daibutsu =

Statue of Buddha in Ibaraki Prefecture, Japan

- 牛久大仏
- Image of the Ushiku Daibutsu
- Interactive map of Ushiku Daibutsu
- Location: Ushiku, Ibaraki, Japan
- Coordinates: 35°58′57″N 140°13′13″E
- Designer: Ōtani Kōshō
- Type: Statue
- Material: Bronze
- Height: Statue: 100 m (330 ft); Including base: 120 m (390 ft)
- Completion date: 1993

Ushiku Daibutsu (牛久大仏) is a statue located in Ushiku, Ibaraki Prefecture, Japan. Completed in 1993, it stands a total of 120 metres (390 ft) tall, including the 10 m (33 ft) base and 10 m lotus platform. It held the record for the tallest statue from 1993 to 2008 and as of 2023, it is the fifth-tallest statue in the world.

An elevator takes visitors up 85 m (279 ft) to an observation floor. The statue depicts Amitabha Buddha and is made of bronze. It is also known as Ushiku ARCADIA (Amida's Radiance and Compassion Actually Developing and Illuminating Area). It was built to commemorate the birth of Shinran, founder of the Jōdo Shinshū 浄土真宗 or "True Pure Land School" of Buddhism.

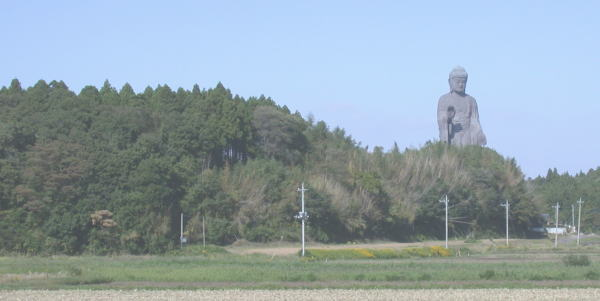
View of Kuno Castle (久野城) ruins along with the Ushiku Daibutsu

== Construction ==
Construction was commissioned to Kawada (ja:川田工業, Kawada Kōgyō), applying curtain wall system (ja:カーテンウォール工法, Kāten uōru kōhō).

First, a cast iron steel column was erected at the center supporting the weight of the entire Daibutsu. Then, a steel frame structure was arranged around it which was pre-assembled on the ground block by block in advance.

The 100 m (330 ft) tall torso, or body, of the statue was divided into 20 tiers, with each tier consisting of 17 blocks on average. In addition, each component block had welded on nine bronze sheets, 1.5 by 1.5 m (4 ft 11 in by 4 ft 11 in) and around 6 millimeters thick, on a steel frame. Those steel frames connected to the main frame as branches of a tree do, forming a complicated outline. The bronze sheets are much lighter than that of the Great Buddha at Tōdai-ji temple in Nara, since the one at Ushiku applies a steel frame to support the structure. The elaborate design of each hand and arm was also assembled on the ground, then attached on the body with a huge crane.

== Details ==
- Weight: 4,003 tonnes (8,825,000 lb)
- Length of left hand: 18 m (59 ft)
- Length of face: 20 m (66 ft)
- Length of eye: 2.55 m (8.4 ft)
- Length of mouth: 4.5 m (15 ft)
- Length of nose: 1.2 m (3.9 ft)
- Length of ear: 10 m (33 ft)
- Length of the first finger: 7 m (23 ft)

Inside the statue itself is a four-storey building, which serves as a museum.

Level 1, Infinite Light and Infinite Life
The first floor lobby is dark. In the center of the room a single shaft of light shines from above onto a cauldron of smoking incense. Beyond it is the elevator to the other floors.
Level 2 (10 m), World of Gratitude and Thankfulness
Mostly dedicated to scriptural studies
Level 3 (20–30 m), World of the Lotus Sanctuary
3,000 samples of gold Buddha statues
Level 4 (80–85 m), Room of Mt. Grdhrakuta
Also on the fourth floor are windows looking out from the Buddha's chest onto the adjacent flower garden and small animal park.

== Panoramic view ==
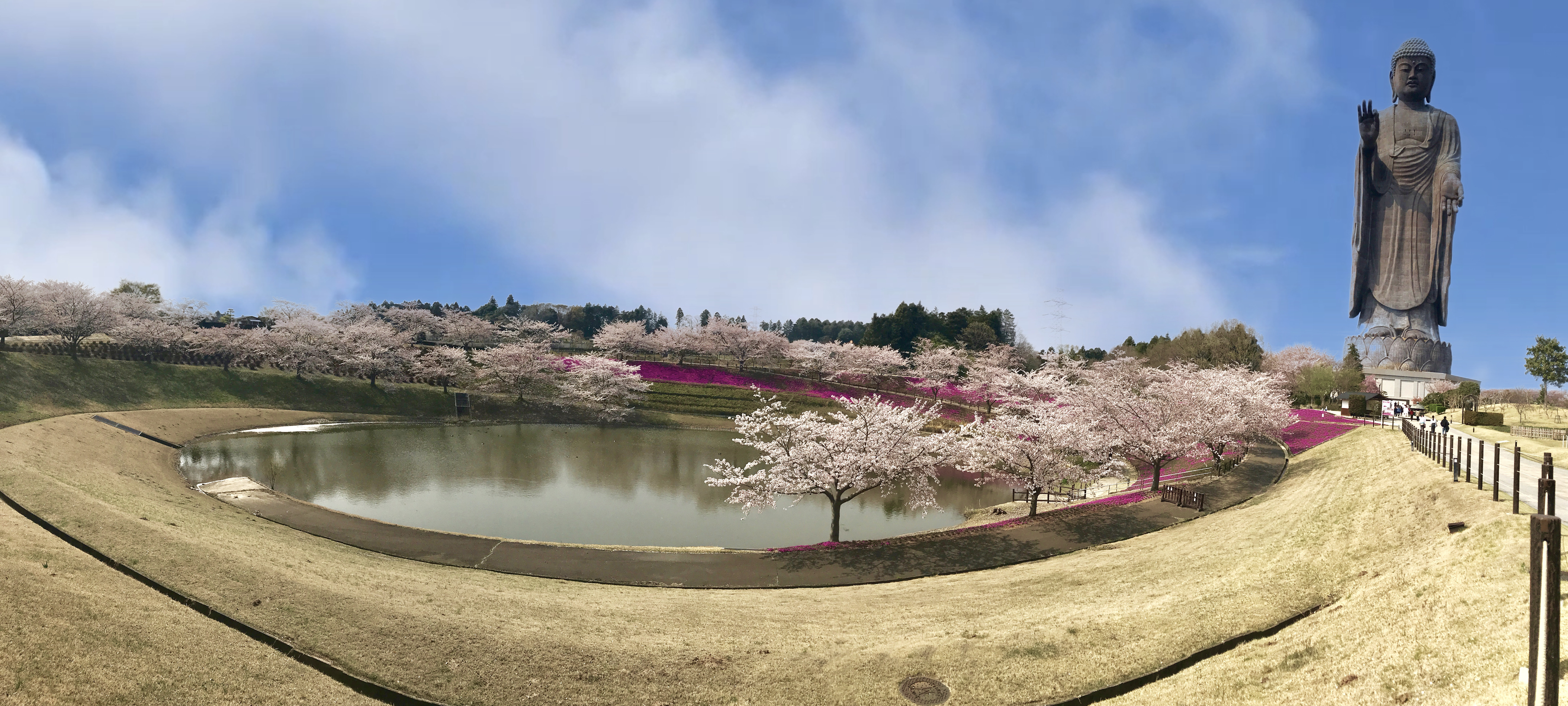
Cherry Blossoms at the Ushiku Daibutsu grounds (Photo from 2018)

== See also ==
- Daibutsu
- Kōtoku-in, temple in Kamakura, home to second largest seated bronze Buddha statue in Japan.
- Tōdai-ji, temple in Nara, home to second largest seated bronze Buddha statue in Japan. The largest being the Great Showa Buddha located in Aomori prefecture standing at 21 m
- Leshan Giant Buddha in China, the tallest stone Buddha sculpture in the world.
- Tian Tan Buddha, located in Hong Kong, world's tallest seated Buddha statue.
- List of tallest statues, many of which are Buddhist statues

Records
Preceded by Sendai Daikannon; 92 m (302 ft)	World's tallest statue 1993–2008	Succeeded by Laykyun Sekkya; 116 m (381 ft)
