= Xishan Island =

Island in Suzhou, Jiangsu, China

Coordinates: 31.12126°N 120.2781°E

- Traditional Chinese: 西山島
- Simplified Chinese: 西山岛
- Literal meaning: West Mountain/Hill/Island Island
Transcriptions
Standard Mandarin
- Hanyu Pinyin: Xīshān Dǎo
- Wade–Giles: Hsi-shan Tao

Xishan Island is an island in Lake Tai administered as part of Wuzhong district, Suzhou, Jiangsu, China.

Xishan is the largest island in Lake Tai, with an area of 79.8 square kilometers (30.8 sq mi). It is highly mountainous, with 41 of the 72 mountains in Taihu Co. located on the island. Its highest peak, Piaomiao Mountain (缥缈峰), reaches 336.6 meters (1,104 ft) above sea level.

The name of the island derived from its principal settlement, Xishan Town (西山镇), but the town's name was changed to Jinting (金庭镇) on 28 June 2007.

The Xishan Scenic Area (西山风景区) was established to encourage tourism in the area. Natural attractions include Mt Shigong (石公山), Linwu Cave (林屋洞), Mingyue Bay (明月湾), Baoshan Temple (包山寺), and "Xiangxuehai" (香雪海). Xishan Island also produces plums, waxberries, oranges, loquats, and peaches.
