= Maligawila Buddha statue =

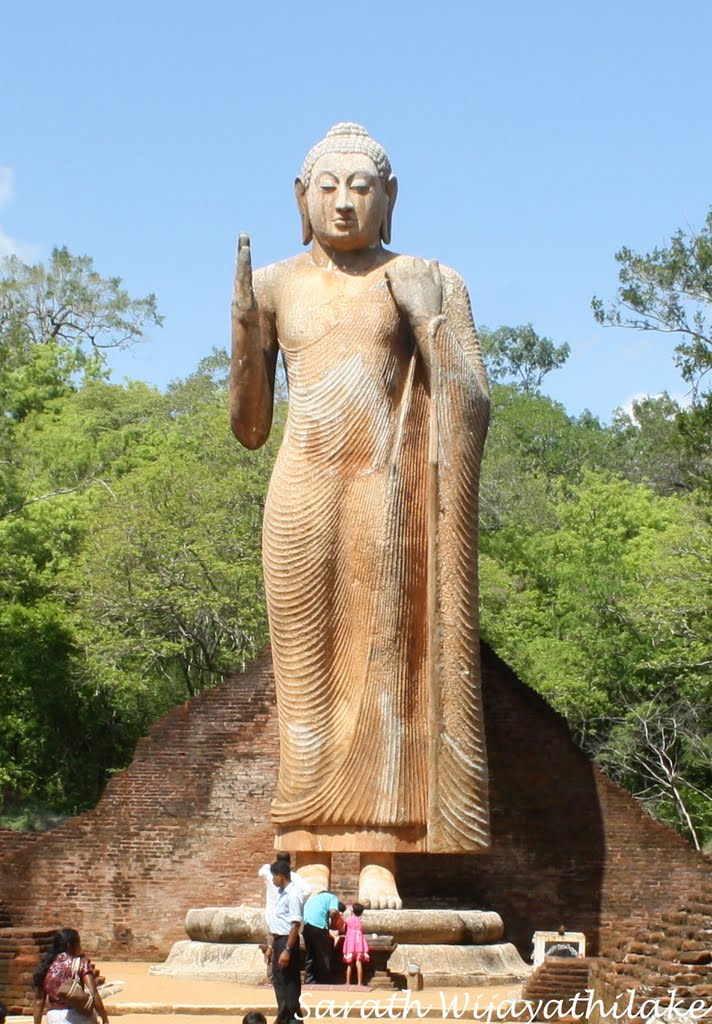
- Year: 7th century
- Type: Stone sculpture
- Location: Maligawila, Sri Lanka

The Maligawila Buddha statue is a standing figure of the Buddha in Sri Lanka, which was carved out of a large limestone rock during the 7th century by prince Aggabodhi, who ruled Ruhuna at that time. It is the tallest free-standing ancient statue of the Buddha in the country. It had been broken into several pieces by the time it was found in 1951. The statue was reconstructed and raised again in 1980 under the direction of the then president Ranasinghe Premadasa.

== Appearance ==
The Maligawila Buddha statue is located close to the village of Maligawila in the Moneragala District of the Uva Province in Sri Lanka. It has been carved from a single large limestone rock, and is considered to be the tallest ancient free-standing image in Sri Lanka, at a height of 37 feet 10 inches (11.53 m). Along with the Buddha statues of Avukana and Buduruvagala, the Maligawila Buddha statue is considered one of the best examples of the standing image of the Buddha from ancient Sri Lanka. It bears a close resemblance to the Avukana statue, and depicts the same asisa mudra, a variation of the Abhaya mudra. The standing Buddha clutches the robe at the left shoulder, while the right hand is raised to the right shoulder.

Ruins around the statue indicate that an image house had been constructed around the statue. It appears to have been about 80 feet (24 m) each in length and breadth, with walls 4 feet (1.2 m) thick. Its height would have been about 65 feet (20 m).

== History and restoration ==
According to the ancient chronicle Chulavamsa, the statue was built in the 7th century by a prince named Aggabodhi from Ruhuna. It mentions that he built a temple named Pathma Vihara, and also constructed a great statue of the Buddha there.

The statue was discovered in 1951, fallen from its pedestal and lying broken to pieces. Before that, it had been damaged by treasure hunters around 1948. A 1974 attempt to raise the Maligawila statue ended in failure. However, another attempt was made in 1991 under then-president Ranasinghe Premadasa. Several of the broken pieces had been damaged, including the right hand, face and feet; these were repaired before reconstructing the statue and re-erecting it. This has been described as a "very significant task" carried out under Premadasa's direction. The Restoration was done by Lankem Ceylon PLC Sri Lanka and the chief technical advisor was Mr Kirthi Samarasuriya (founder of Petrokem Lanka (Pvt) Ltd) who came up with the epoxy adhesive to chemically paste the pieces together. The successful raising of the statue was undertaken by Mr. Gemunu Silva (State Engineering Corporation) and Mr. H.A. Wijegunawardhana (Chief Engineer, Sri Lanka Ports Authority). The surveying and levelling were performed by Mr Gamini Anura, then-Superintendent of Surveys for Moneragala District. The Maligawila Buddha statue attracts a large number of pilgrims every year.

== See also ==
- Samadhi statue
- Toluvila statue

== Bibliography ==
von Schroeder, Ulrich. (1990). Buddhist Sculptures of Sri Lanka. (752 p.; 1620 illustrations). Hong Kong: Visual Dharma Publications, Ltd. ISBN 962-7049-05-0
