= Grand Buddha at Ling Shan =

Statue in Wuxi, Jiangsu, China

Grand Buddha
- 灵山大佛 (Chinese); 靈山大佛 (Chinese)
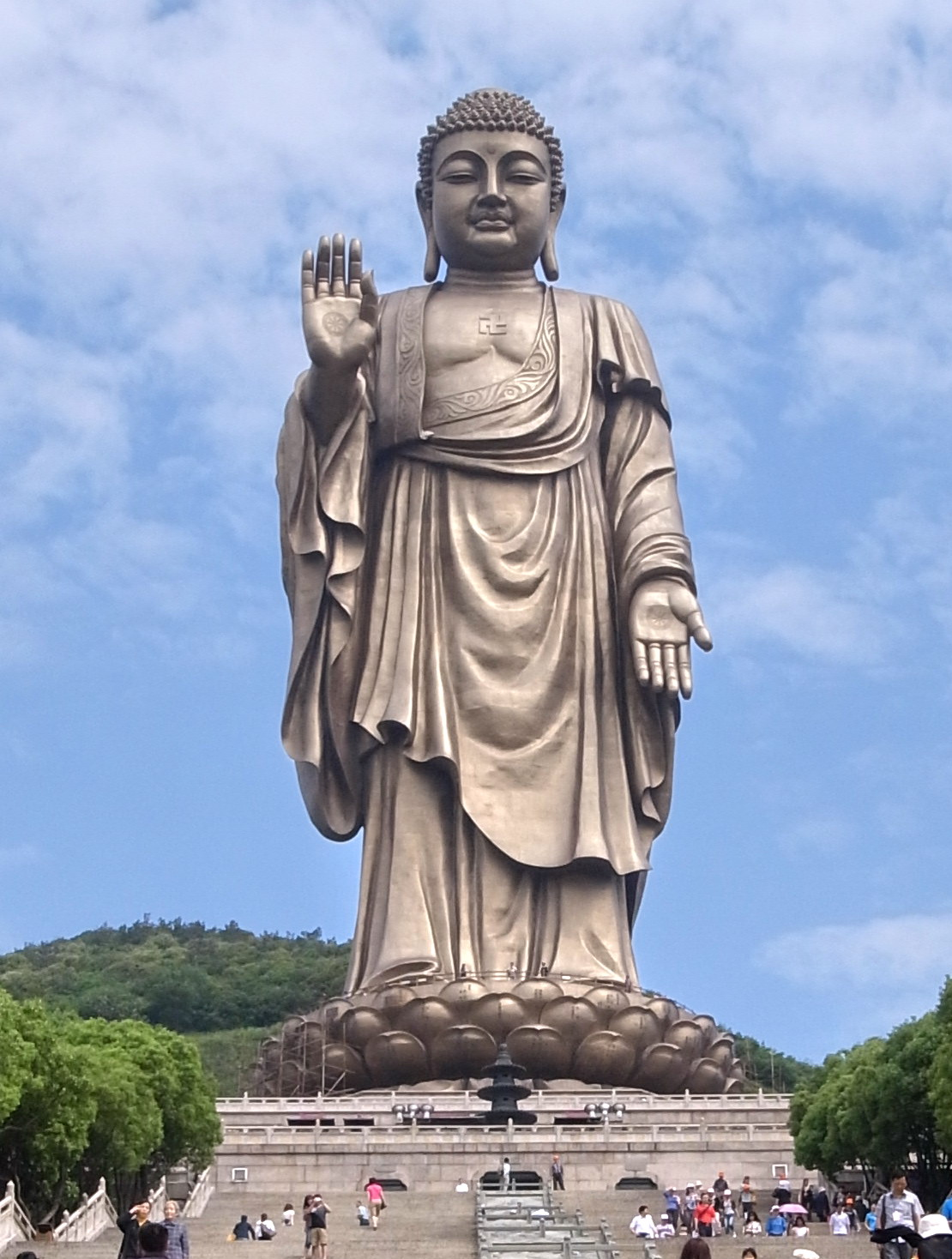
- Giant Buddha, Wuxi
- Interactive map of Grand Buddha
- Location: Mashan Subdistrict, Binhu District, Wuxi, Jiangsu
- Coordinates: 31°25′55″N 120°5′29″E
- Height: 88 m (289 ft)
- Completion date: 1996
- Dedicated to: Amitabha Buddha

The Grand Buddha (simplified Chinese: 灵山大佛; traditional Chinese: 靈山大佛; pinyin: Língshān Dà Fó) is located on the north shore of Lake Tai, near Wuxi, Jiangsu, within the Lingshan Scenic Area. It is one of the largest Buddha statues in China and also in the world.

The Grand Buddha at Ling Shan is an outdoor bronze Amitabha standing Buddha, weighing over 700 metric tons (690 long tons; 770 short tons). It was completed at the end of 1996. The monument is 88 meters (289 ft) in total height, including a 9 m lotus pedestal. In 2008, the Five-signets Palace and a Hinduism-inspired Brahma Palace were built south-east of the Grand Buddha Statue.

== Gallery ==
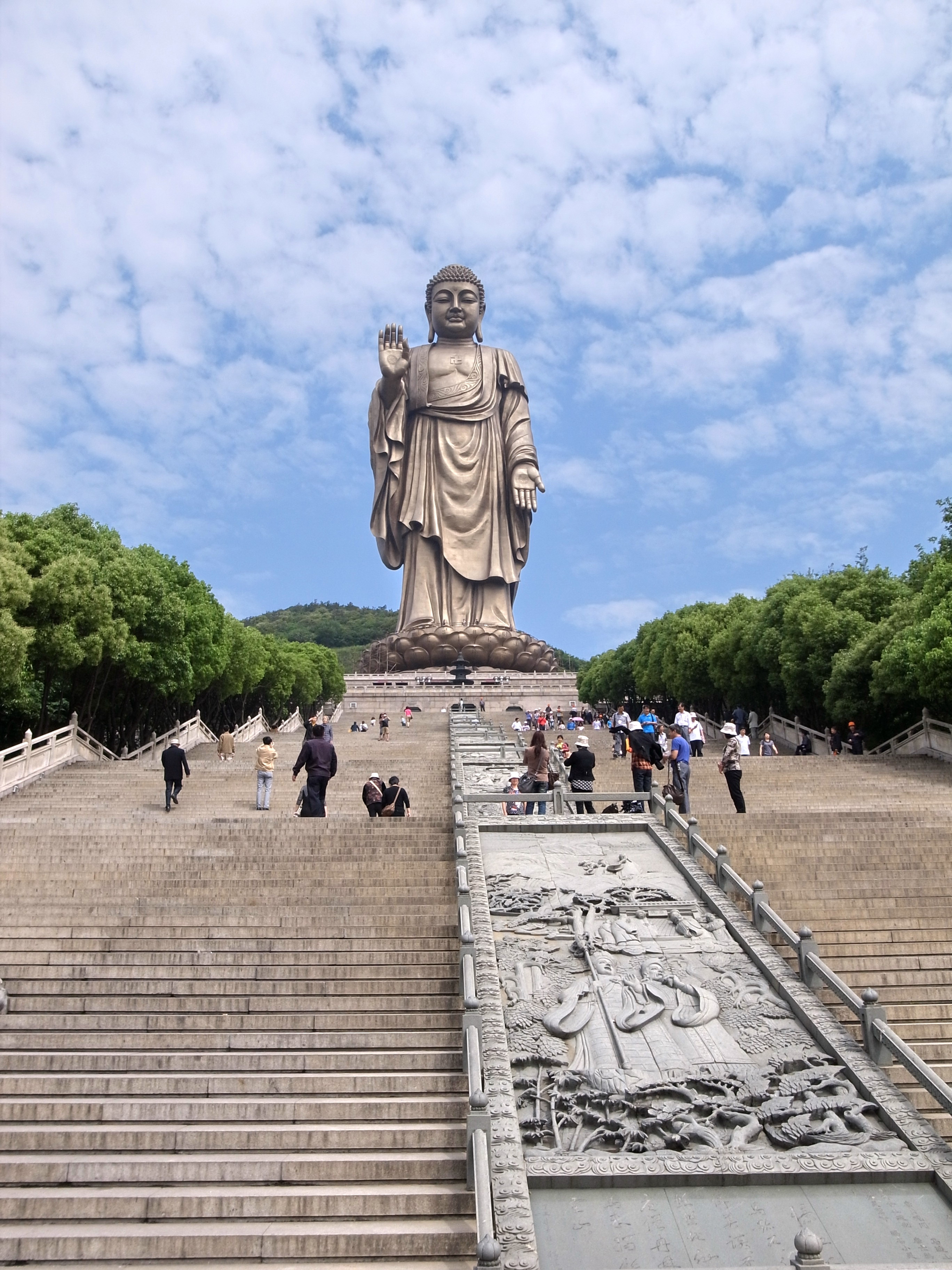

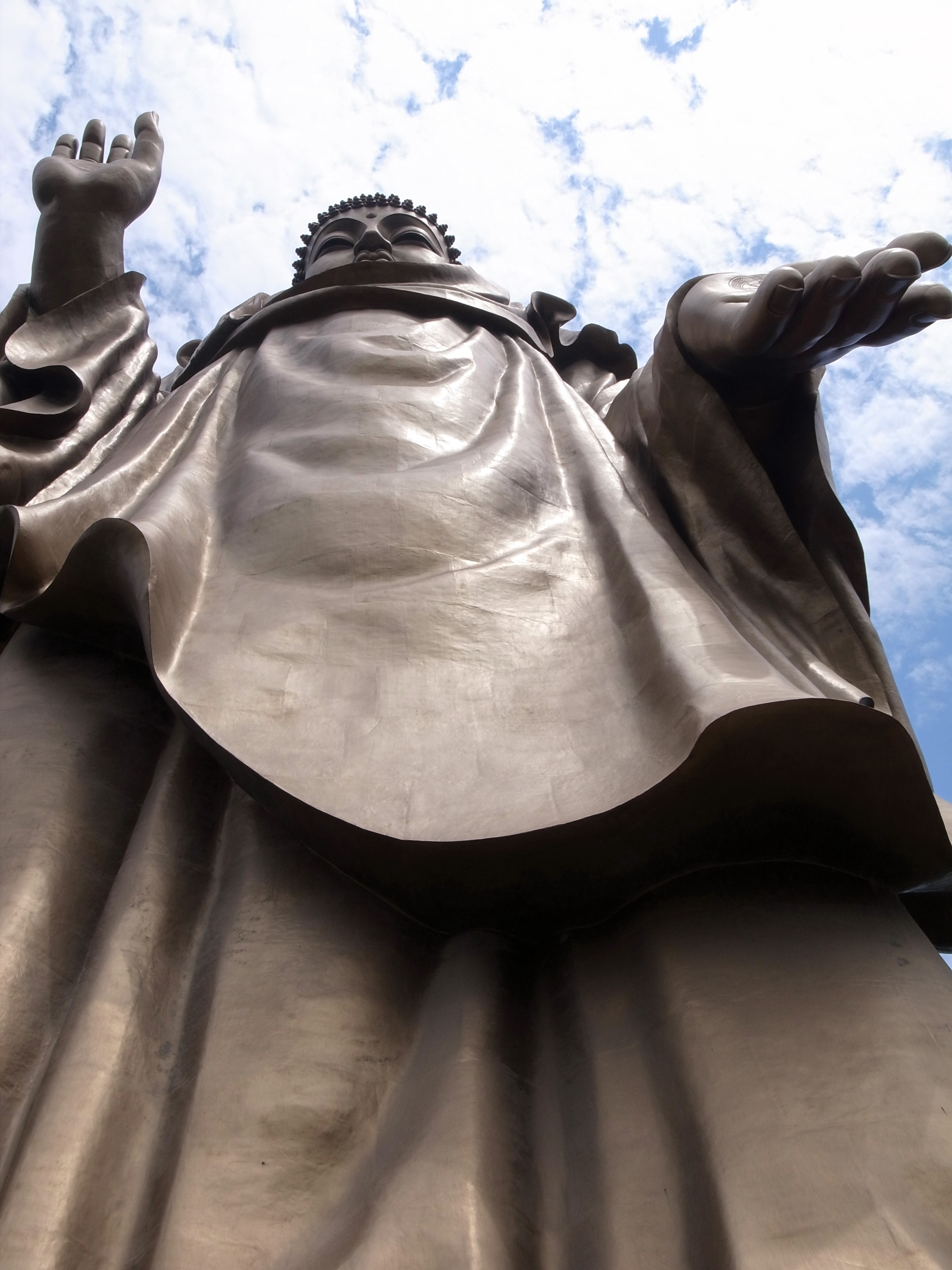

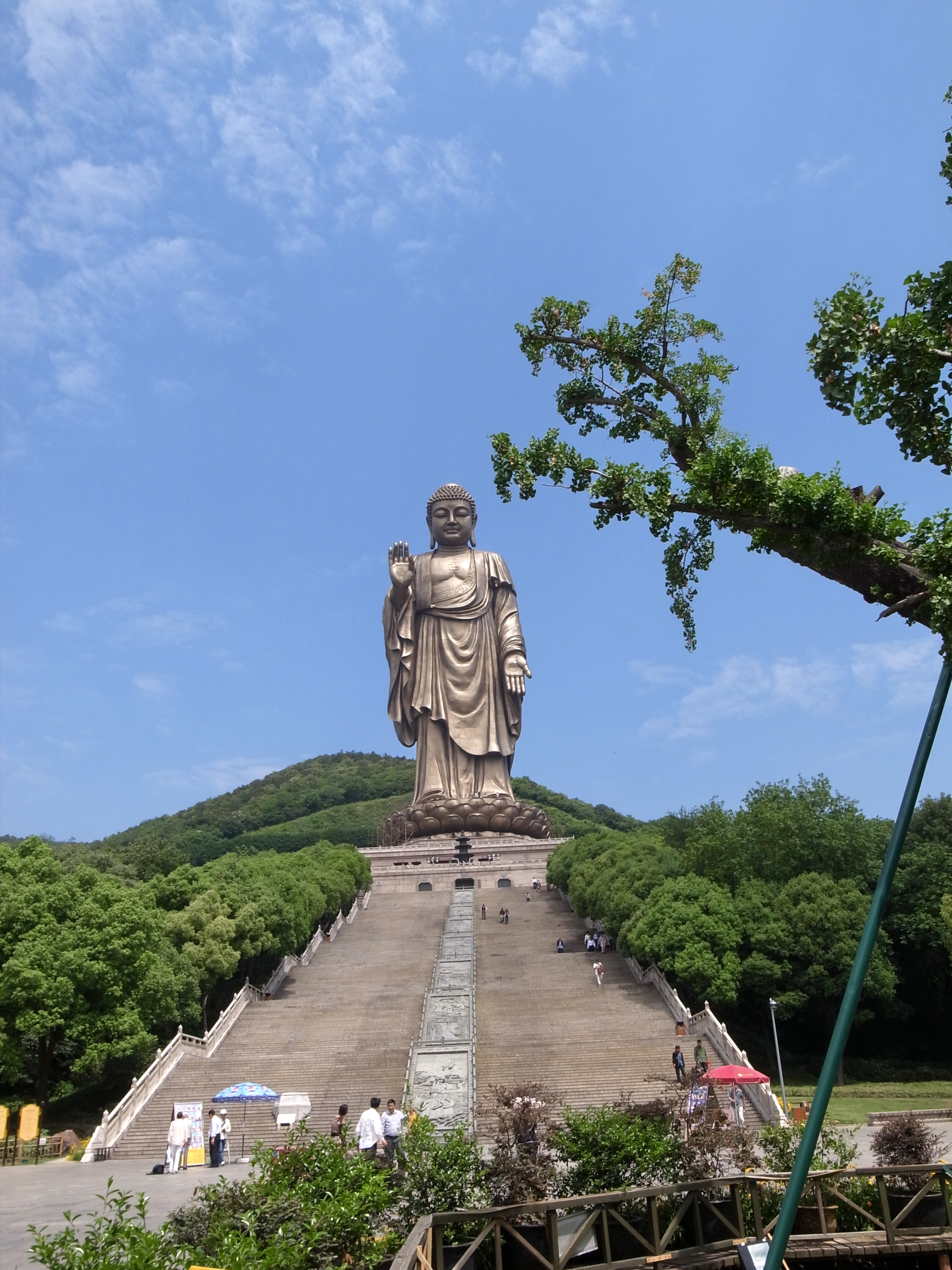

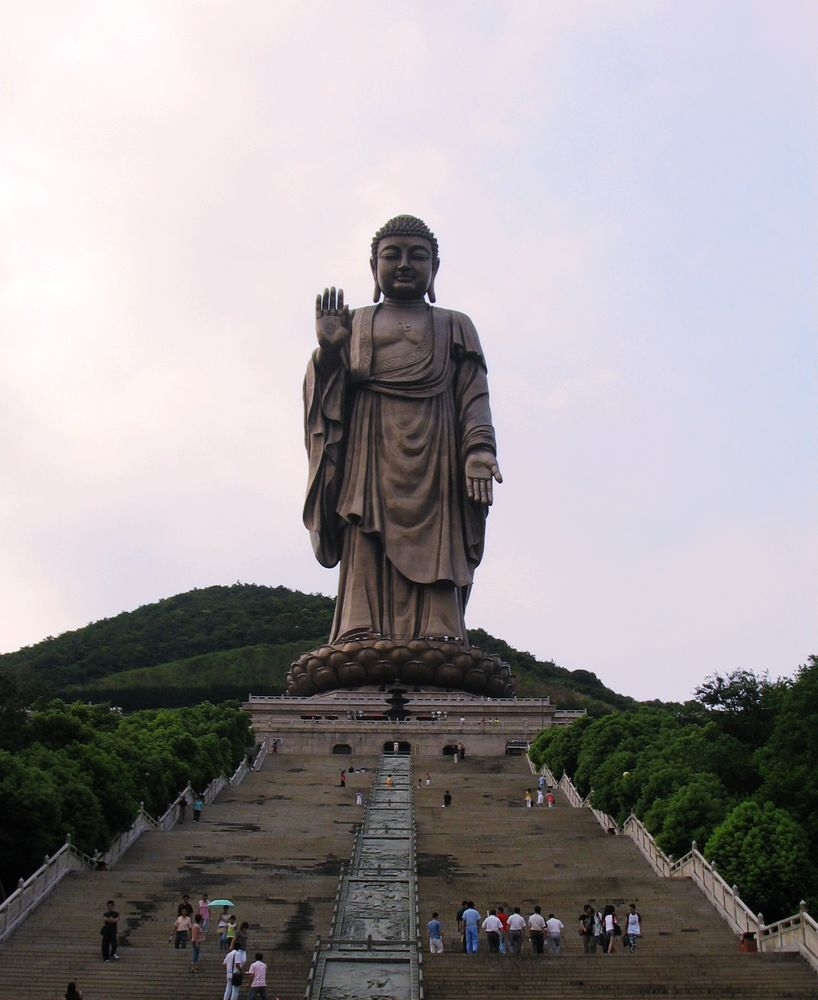

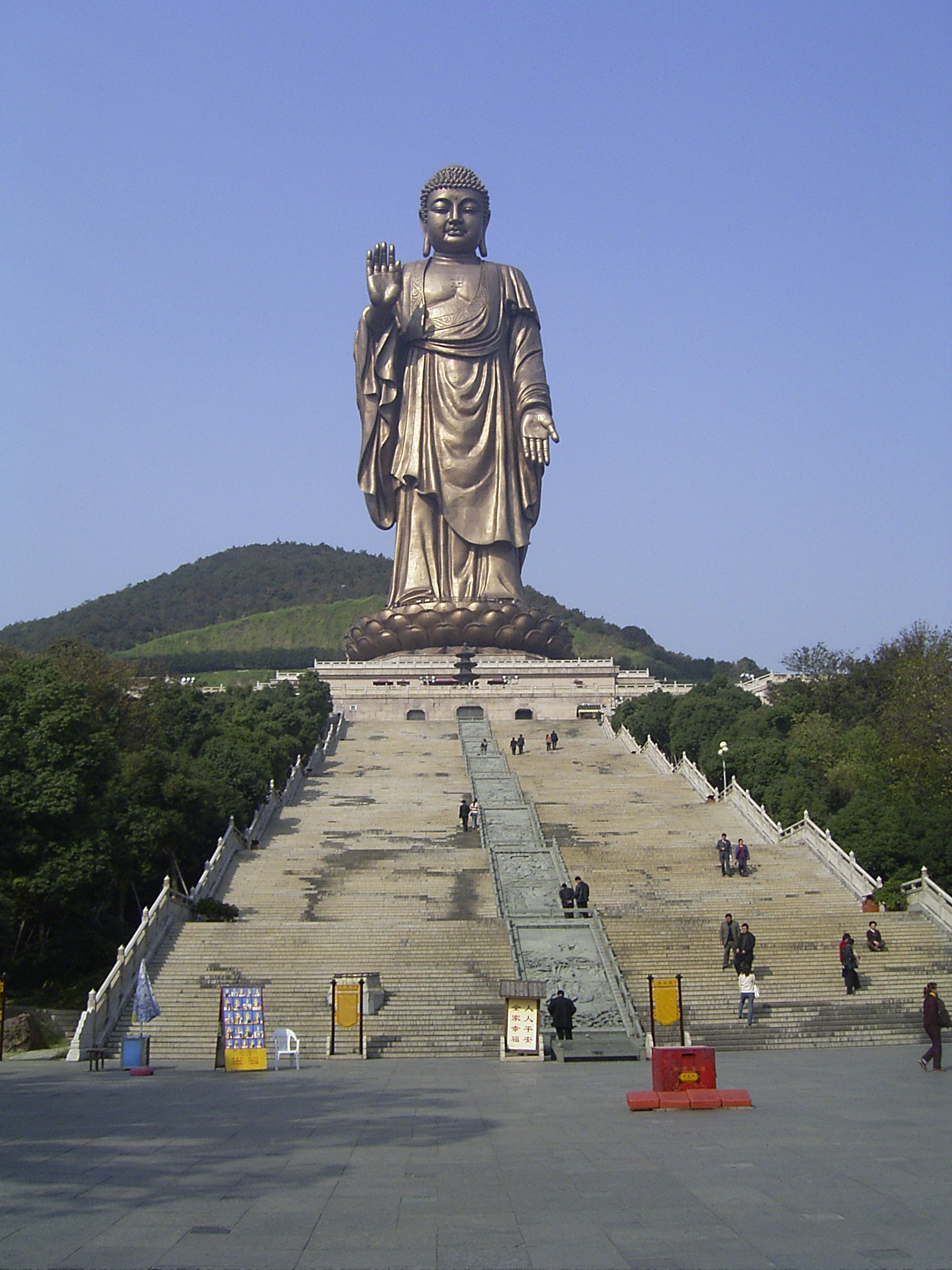

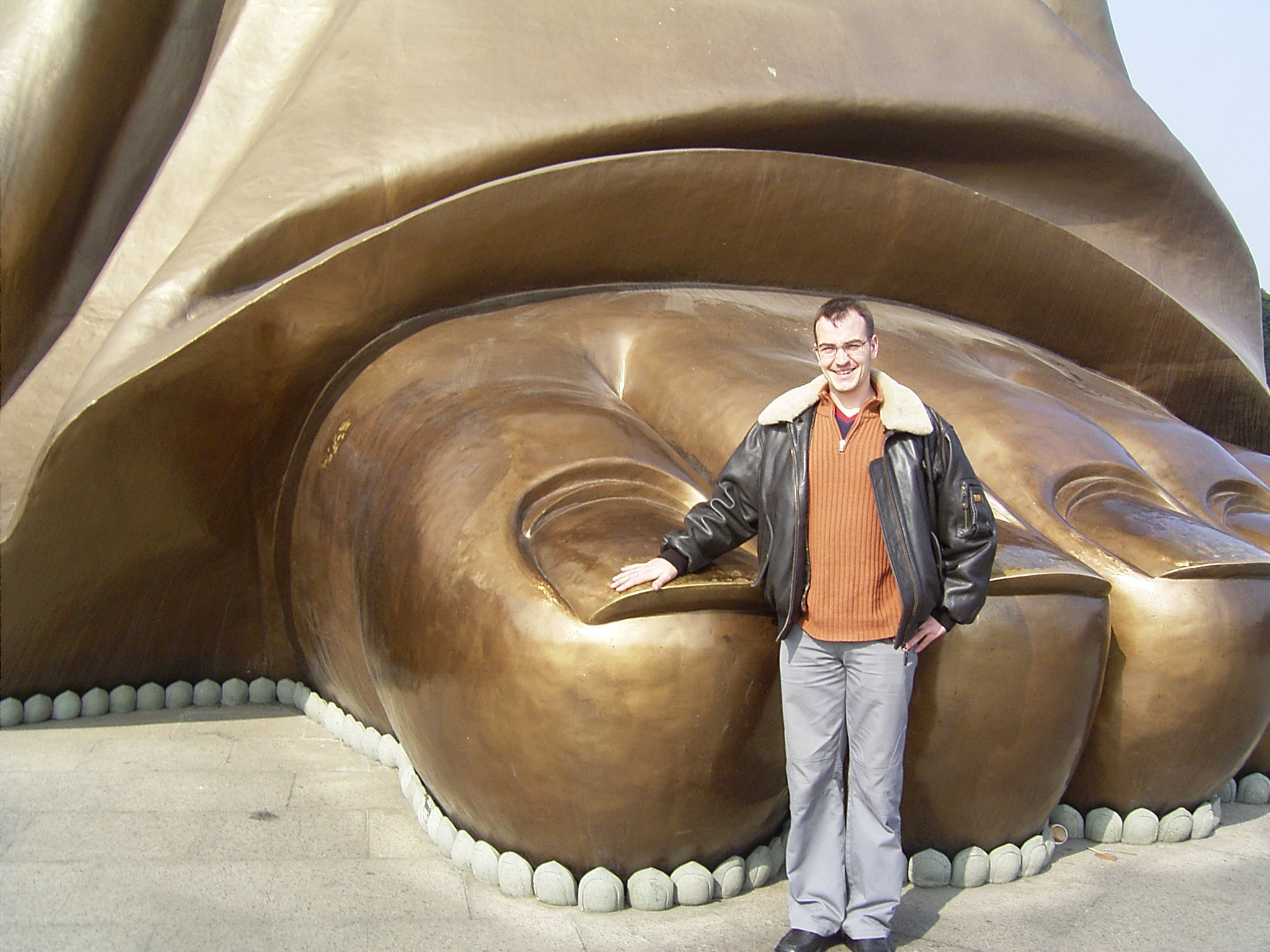

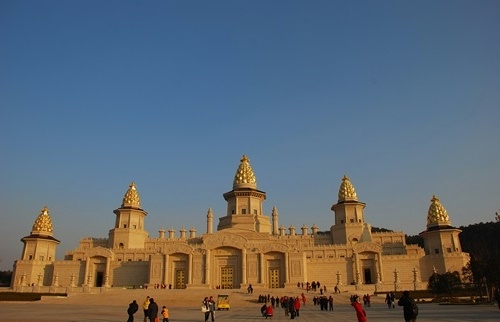
Lingshan Brahma Palace

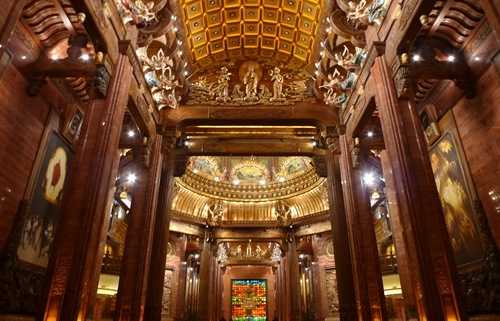
Inside Ling Shan Brahma Palace

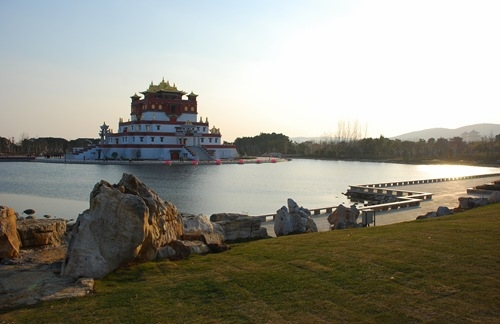
Ling Shan "Five-signets" Palace

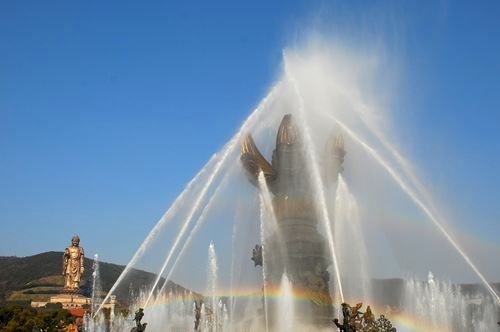
Ling Shan the Buddha's birth

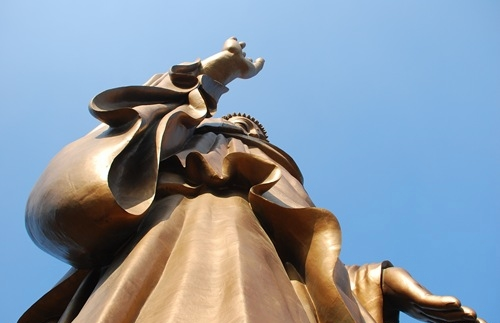
Ling Shan the Grand Buddha

Hand of Buddha at Ling Shan (replica)

== See also ==
- List of tallest statues
