= List of the tallest statues in India =

List of statues in India by height.

== Pre-1980s ==
Statue	Depicts	Locations	State	Height		Notes	Completed	Photo	
Statue	Depicts	Locations	State	m	ft	Notes	Completed	Photo	
Statue	Adinath, Bawangaja	Adinath	Barwani	Madhya Pradesh	26	85	This is one of the older tallest statues in India	1100	
Statue	Gomateswara	Bahubali	Sravanabelagola	Karnataka	18	59	Tallest free–standing monolithic statue in the world.	983	This statue symbolizes the Jain ideal of detachment and non-violence
Statue	Adinath statue at Gwalior Fort	Adinath	Siddhachal Caves, Gwalior	Madhya Pradesh	17.81	58.4	Rock cut idol of Adinatha bhagwan	1500	
Statue	Tirumulai Neminath Statue	Neminath	Polur	Tamil Nadu	16.0	52.5	The tallest Jain sculpture in Tamil Nadu	1100	
Parshvanatha temple, Gopachal	Parshvanatha	Gwalior	Madhya Pradesh	14	46	Largest Parshvanatha statue in lotus position	14th—15th century		
Khandargiri Cave Adinath statue	Rishabhanatha	Chanderi	Madhya Pradesh	13.7	45		13th century		
Gommateshwara statue, Karkala	Bahubali	Karkala	Karnataka	12.8	42		1432		
Dharmasthala statue	Bahubali	Dakshina Kannada	Karnataka	12	39		1973		
Horse statue	Sri Perungaraiyadi Meenda Ayyanar Temple	Kulamangalam, Alangudi(T.k), Pudukkottai	Tamil Nadu	11.27	37.0	Standing Hanuman	18th century		
Venur	Bahubali	Dakshina Kannada	Karnataka	10.7	35		1604		
Shantinath statue at Aggalayya Gutta	Shantinath	Warangal	Telangana	9.14	30.0	Rock-cut image of Shantinatha	11th century		
Kumbhoj statue	Bahubali	Kolhapur district	Maharashtra	8.5	28		1963		
Statue of Shantinath at Bhojpur Jain Temple	Shantinatha	Bhojpur, Madhya Pradesh	Madhya Pradesh	6.86	22.5		1100	This statue symbolizes the Jain ideal of detachment and non-violence	
Shantinath statue at Aharji	Shantinatha	Aharji	Madhya Pradesh	6.7	22		1180		
Gommatagiri	Bahubali	Mysore District	Karnataka	6	20		1100		
Statue of Dying Buddha	Buddha	Kushinagar	Uttar Pradesh	6	20		1956		
Parshvanatha basadi statue	Parshvanatha	Sravanabelagola	Karnataka	5.5	18		10th century		
Parshvanatha basadi statue	Parshvanatha	Halebidu, Hassan District	Karnataka	5.5	18		1133		
Shantinatha basadi statue	Shantinatha	Halebidu, Hassan District	Karnataka	5.5	18		1192		
Namakkal Anjaneyar Temple	Hanuman	Namakkal	Tamil Nadu	5.5	18	More Than 1500 Years OldNamakkal Sri Anjaneyar temple			
Jambu Swami Statue	Jambu Swami	Mathura Chaurasi	Uttar Pradesh	5.5	18	Largest statue of Jambu Swami, the last kevali according to Jainism			
Bahubali Statue	Bahubali	Shikohpur	Haryana	5.5	18				
Naugaza Digambar Jain Temple	Shantinatha	Alwar	Rajasthan	5.33	17.5		922 A.D.		
Mindroling Monastery	Gautam Buddha	Dehradun, Uttarakhand	Uttarakhand	32.6	107		1965		

== Recent ==
Following the "resurgence of Hindu nationalist politics" and the rise of the BJP, large statues of deities and other Hindu, Buddhist, Jain and secular icons have been built in India since the late 1980s "for political stakes". According to Jain, they are an expression of political and religious forces, a "materialization" of the interplay between "new image technologies, neospiritual religious movements, Hindu nationalist politics, globalization, and Dalit-Bahujan verifications of equality and presence". According to Jain, these statues "have been increasingly deployed in "statue wars" in which politicians seek to outdo aone another in building spectacular statues for their electoral constituencies (known in India as vote banks), despite inevitable public criticism for squandering limited state resources on such symbolic projects". The building of these statues has also led to heated debates between various political parties.

Statue	Depicts	Locations	State	Height		Notes	Completed	Photos
Statue	Depicts	Locations	State	m	ft	Notes	Completed	Photos
Statue of Unity	Vallabhbhai Patel	Sadhu Bet, Sardar Sarovar Dam	Gujarat	182	597	World's tallest statue	2018	
Statue of Belief	Lord Shiva	Nathdwara, Rajasthan	Rajasthan	112.4	369	World's tallest sitting statue	2022	
Statue of Equality	Ramanuja	Hyderabad, Telangana	Telangana	65.8	216	India's second tallest sitting statue	2022	
Statue of Social Justice	B. R. Ambedkar	Vijaywada	Andhra Pradesh	62.78	206.0	World's tallest Ambedkar statue	2024	
Statue of B. R. Ambedkar	B. R. Ambedkar	Hyderabad	Telangana	53.34	175.0	Second-tallest Ambedkar statue	2023	
Statue of Bhagavan Hanuman	Lord Hanuman	Manav Bharti University, Solan	Himachal Pradesh	57	187	155-foot-tall statue of Lord Hanuman, considered one of the tallest in the world.	2019	
Hanuman Statue	Lord Hanuman	Beside Vamsadhara River, Madapam	Andhra Pradesh	52	171	World's tallest Hanuman statue	2020	Hanuman Statue of Mandapam
Statue of Spirituality	Lord Shiva	Vrindavan	Uttar Pradesh	50.29	165.0	World's third tallest Sitting statue and the second tallest statue of Shiva in India and World	2025	
Panchamukhi Hanuman Statue	Lord Hanuman in Panchamukha-form	Bidanagere, Kunigal	Karnataka	49	161	World's tallest 5 faced Hanuman statue.	2022	
Muthumalai Murugan Statue	Lord Murugan	Salem	Tamil Nadu	44.5	146	World's tallest Murugan statue	2022	
Maa Vaishno Devi Statue	Vaishno Devi	Vrindavan	Uttar Pradesh	43	141		2010	
Chambal Mata Statue	Chambal Mata	Kota	Rajasthan	42.5	139	Including the height of the pedestal, the total height is 75.5m to 78m	2023	
Veera Abhaya Anjaneya Hanuman Swami	Hanuman	Vijayawada	Andhra Pradesh	41	135	World's second tallest Hanuman statue	2003	
Thiruvalluvar Statue	Thiruvalluvar	Kanniyakumari	Tamil Nadu	40.5	133	The entire 133 feet monument depicts the three sections of Thirukkural, namely, virtue (38 chapters), wealth (70 chapters) and love (25 chapters). The statue has a height of 95 feet (29 m) and stands upon a 38-foot (11.5 m) pedestal. Tallest stone sculpture statue contains 3681 stones ranges up to 15 tons per piece.	2000	
Tathagata Tsal (Buddha Park of Ravangla)	Gautam Buddha	Ravangla	Sikkim	39	128		2013	
Statue of Valour	Lachit Borphukan	Jorhat	Assam	38.1	125	Bronze statue of Ahom general	2024	
Dhyana Buddha statue	Buddha	Amaravathi village, Guntur district	Andhra Pradesh	38.1	125	Dhyana Buddha statue of Amaravati	2015	
Statue of Padmasambhava, Rewalsar	Guru Rinpoche	Rewalsar	Himachal Pradesh	37.5	123	Statue of Guru Rinponche	2012	
Marjing Polo Statue	Marjing, Manipuri Pony and Sagol Kangjei	Marjing Polo Complex, Heingang Ching (Marjing Hills), Heingang, Imphal East district	Manipur	37	122 (Note: Many news websites mislead the height as "110 feet", "120 feet", etc.)	World's tallest equestrian statue of a polo player	2023	
Shiva of Murudeshwara	Shiva	Murudeshwara, Uttara Kannada district	Karnataka	37	121	The third tallest statue of Shiva in the world, and the second tallest in India.	2006	
Sai Baba statue	Sai Baba of Shirdi	Repuru, Kakinada	Andhra Pradesh	35.5	116	Tallest statue of Sai Baba in the world	2015	
Adiyogi Shiva statue	Shiva	Coimbatore	Tamil Nadu	34.2	112	Largest and tallest face in the world, made up of 500 tonnes of steel. Height of 112 feet symbolically denotes that Adiyogi gave 112 ways to explore the human system	2017, Feb 24th	Adiyogi Shiva statue
Basaveshwara statue	Basava	Gadag	Karnataka	33.83	111	The statue of Basaveshwara has been erected in the middle of the 103-acre tank in Gadag district of Karnataka. A 111-foot statue of Basaveshwara at the Bhishma Lake is the tallest statue of Basavanna in India.	2015, Apr 27th	
Hanuman Statue of Damanjodi	Hanuman	Damanjodi, Koraput	Odisha	33.1	108'9"	World's third tallest Hanuman located at NALCO township, Damanjodi, Koraput	2017, March 3	|-
Shiva Keshava swaroopam	Vishnu	Ejipura	Karnataka	33.1	108		2016	
Gaur Yamuna City	Lord Krishna	Noida	Uttar Pradesh	33	108	World's tallest Sri Krishna statue	2025, February 10	
Basaveshwara statue	Basava	Basavakalyan	Karnataka	33	108	Statue of Basava in the world	2014	Basavanna Statue in Karnataka
Statue of Prosperity	Kempe Gowda	Devanahalli, Bangalore	Karnataka	33	108	Tallest bronze statue of a founder of a city.	2022	
Statue of Ahimsa	Rishabhanatha	Mangi-Tungi, Maharashtra	Maharashtra	33	108	World's tallest Jain idol (121 feet including pedestal) and also largest monolith statue in the world	2016	
Statue of Adinath Dada, Palitana Temples	Adinatha	Palitana group of Temples	Gujarat	33	108		2016	
Shri Hanuman Jakhu	Hanuman	Shimla	Himachal Pradesh	33	108	Located at 8,500 feet (2,600 m) above sea level	2010	
Hanuman Murti in Shahjahanpur	Hanuman	Shahjahanpur	Uttar Pradesh	32	105	Hanumat Dham Statue	2013	
Diskit Monastery	Maitreya Buddha	Diskit, Nubra Valley, Ladakh	Jammu and Kashmir	32	105	Statue of Jampa	2010	
Hanuman in Nandura	Hanuman	Nandura	Maharashtra	32	105			
Agara shri Hanuman statue	Hanuman	Bengaluru	Karnataka	31.08	102.0		2012	
Mangal Mahadev	Shiva	Gangtan, Sampla Beri Road	Haryana	30.8	101	Standing statue	2012	
statue of Lord hanuman	Hanuman	Chhindwara, Simariya	Madhya Pradesh	30.8	101	Madhya Pradesh tallest statue	2014	
Har Ki Pauri Shiva statue	Shiva	Haridwar	Uttarakhand	30.5	100		2012	
Abbirajupalem Hanuman Statue	Hanuman	Doddipatla	Andhra Pradesh	30	98	Standing Hanuman	2013	
Hanuman Statue	Hanuman	Erravaram	Andhra Pradesh	29.6	97	Standing Hanuman		
Vasavi Matha Statue	Vasavi Matha	Penugonda	Andhra Pradesh	27.43	90	Standing Vasavi Matha - Panchaloha (an alloy of five metals).	2019	
Standing Buddha Statue	Buddha	Sarnath, Varanasi	Uttar Pradesh	27	89.5	Standing Buddha	2017	
Shri Hanuman Dham	Hanuman	Kiratpur	Uttar Pradesh	27	89	Hanuman Dham Statue created by Pradeep Chauhan	1997	
Siddheswar Dham	Shiva	Namchi	Sikkim	26.5	87	It offers a statue of Lord Shiva encircled by a dozen Jyotirlingas and replicas of the four Dhams of the country.	2011	
Chinmaya Ganadhish	Ganesha	Kolhapur	Maharashtra state	26	85	Idol at Chinmaya Sandeepany Ashram	2001	
Sivagiri of Bijapur	Shiva	Karnataka	Karnataka	26	85	The fourth tallest statue of Shiva in the world. The third tallest statue of Shiva in India	2006	
Great Buddha Statue in Bodhgaya	Buddha	Bodhgaya	Bihar	25	82	Mahabodhi Temple Complex in Gaya	1989	
Statue of Lord Shiva (Meinindranaatha Swami)	Shiva	Keeramangalam	Tamil Nadu	24.68	81	Thirty-first tallest statue in India, Third tallest statue in Tamil Nadu, Sixth tallest Shiva statue in India, Ninth tallest Shiva statue in the world.	2016, Feb 20th	
Hanuman of the Ram Tirth temple	Hanuman	Amritsar	Punjab	24.5	80	Ram Tirath temple		
Hanuman Statue	Hanuman	Samalkot	Andhra Pradesh	24.07	79.0	Standing Hanuman		
Lord Shiva	Shiva	Jabalpur	Madhya Pradesh	23.17	76.0	The fifth tallest statue of Lord Shiva in the world. The fourth tallest statue of Shiva in India	2006	
Kote Anjaneya Statue	Hanuman	Tumkur	Karnataka	23	75	Hanuman statue in standing posture with Rama and Lakshman on his shoulders.	2005	
Hanuman Vatika	Hanuman	Rourkela	Orissa	23	75	second tallest statue of Hanuman	1994	
Golden Buddha in the Likir Monastery	Buddha	Ladakh	Jammu and Kashmir	23	75	There is a small museum which houses collections of thankas, old religious and domestic costumes	1999	
Abhaya Buddha at Eluru Buddha Park	Buddha	Eluru	Andhra Pradesh	22.56	74.0	Tallest Abhaya Buddha statue (standing posture) in South India	2013	
Ganapati Dham Temple	Ganesha	Bahadurgarh	Haryana	22.56	74.0	World's tallest Ganesha statue	2009	
Statue of Mahatma Gandhi	Mahatma Gandhi	Patna	Bihar	22	72	Statue of Lord Ganesh atop the Birla Temple	2013	
Lord Ganesha	Lord Ganesha	Pimpri-Chinchwad	Maharashtra	22	72	Statue of Lord Ganesha	2009	
Lord Hanuman Balaji Statue	Hanuman	NH-162, Pali, Rajasthan	Rajasthan	21.94	72.0	Statue of Hanuman with Lord Ram And Lakshaman	2010	
Lord Buddha Statue	Buddha	lake Ghora Katora, Rajgir	Bihar	21.34	70.0	the Buddha in Dhammachakra mudra	2018	
Gangadhareshwara	Shiva	Azhimala Temple, Kovalam	Kerala	20.7264	68.000	Tallest statue of Lord Shiva in Kerala and tallest statue of Gangadhareshwara form of Lord Shiva in India.	2020	
Hanuman in Punjab	Hanuman	Sankat Mochan Hanuman, Phillaur	Punjab	21	69	Standing Statue		
Hanuman in New Delhi	Hanuman	Jhandewalan, New Delhi	Delhi	20	66	Standing Statue		
Navagraha Jain Temple Statue	Parshvanatha	Hubli	Karnataka	18.6	61	This is the largest Parshavanatha statue in world with height of 61 feet mounted on 48 feet pedestal(total height 109 feet).	2010	
Shiva at Bhanjanagar Reservoir	Shiva	Bhanjanagar	Odisha	18.6	61	The seventh tallest Statue of Lord Shiva in the world. The sixth tallest Statue of Lord Shiva in India	2013	
Shri Chamundeshwari Statue	Chamundeshwari	Channapatna	Karnataka	18.3	60	Located in the premises of Shri Chamundeshwari Basavappanavara Temple in Gowdagere, this statue is the world's tallest statue of Goddess Chamundeshwari who is considered to be one of the forms of the Goddess Durga or Adishakti.	2021	
Buddha Statue of Hyderabad	Buddha	Lake Hussain Sagar, Hyderabad	Telangana	18	59	World's tallest monolith of Gautama Buddha	1992	
Hanuman	Hanuman	Puttaparthi	Andhra Pradesh	18	59	Found on top of the Vidya Giri Hill overlooking the Sri Sathya Sai International Hillview Stadium.	1985	
Hanuman	Hanuman	Kondagattu, jagityal	Telangana	17.06	56.0	standing Hanuman	2003	
Senior NTR statue	Lord Krishna	Khammam	Telangana	16.4	54	Standing Lord Krishna	2023	
Munisuvrata statue	Munisuvrata	Jainaragutti near Adagur	Karnataka	16.4	54	The tallest statue of Munisuvrata	2022	
Sai Baba Statue	Sai Baba of Shirdi	Machilipatnam	Andhra Pradesh	16.4	54			
Hanuman Statue	Hanuman	Bathinda	Punjab	15.24	50.0	Hanuman Chowk		
Bahubali statue	Bahubali	Firozabad	Uttar Pradesh	13.7	45			
45 ft Sri Abhaya Anjaneeya Swamy	Hanuman	Hanuman Junction	Andhra Pradesh	13.7	45	Tallest Hanuman in Hanuman Junction	2015	
Rishabhanatha statue at Abhay Prabhavana Museum	Rishabhanatha	Parvadi village near Pune	Maharashtra	13	43	A 43 feet (13 m) statue of Rishabhanatha has been installed at the Abhay Prabhavana Museum, the largest museum of ideas dedicated to Jain philosophy and Indian heritage.	2024	
Shri Bhaktha Anjaneyar	Hanuman	Vedasandur, Dindigul district	Tamil Nadu	15.54	51.0		2008	
Bangeswar Mahadev	Shiva	Salkia, Howrah	West Bengal	15.54	51.0	Tallest Shiva idol in eastern India bank of River Ganges	2016	
Bahubali statue of Pusegaon	Bahubali	Pusegaon, Hingoli district	Maharashtra	15.54	51.0		2022	
Hanuman statue, Alakhnath Temple	Hanuman	Bareilly	Uttar Pradesh	15.54	51.0			
Kuravan and Kurathi Statue	Kuravan & Kurathi	Idukki District	Kerala	12.2	40		2005	
Balamurugan Statue	Murugan	Saveetha Institute of Medical And Technical Sciences	Tamil Nadu	12.2	40	Monolith sculpture of a young Lord Bala Murugan	2020, 8 February	
Sri Rama Bhaktha Anjaneyar temple, anjaneyar statue	Hanuman	Ayipettai, Cuddalore	Tamil Nadu	11.28	37.0		2015	
Mounagiri Hanuman	Hanuman	Anantapur	Andhra Pradesh	11	36	South India's tallest monolithic statue located at Mounagiri Global Trust	2010	
Dakshinmukhi Hanuman Statue	Hanuman	Saifai, Etawah district	Uttar Pradesh	10.7	35		2016	
Lachit & his Army	Lachit Borphukan	Machkhowa, Guwahati	Assam	10.7	35	The statue of Ahom general Lachit Borphukan with soldiers and cannons	2016	
Shrimad Rajchandra statue, Shrimad Rajchandra Ashram	Shrimad Rajchandra	Dharampur	Gujarat	10.36	34.0	World's tallest statue of Shrimad Rajchandra	2017	
Shantinath statue, Hastinapur Jain temple	Shantinath	Hastinapur	Uttar Pradesh	9.8	32			
Shantinath Jinalaya	Shantinath	Shri Mahaveerji	Rajasthan	9.8	32			
Viswaroopa Bhakta Anjaneya	Hanuman	Nanganallur, Chennai	Tamil Nadu	9.8	32		1989	
Vahelna Statue	Parshvanatha	Vahelna, Muzaffarnagar	Uttar Pradesh	9.5	31		2011	
Statue of Vasupujya	Vasupujya	Champapur, Bhagalpur	Bihar	9.5	31	Tallest statue of Lord Vasupujya in the World	2014	
Statue of Rishabhdev	Rishabhanatha	Bada Gaon, Baghpat	Uttar Pradesh	9.5	31	Made up of Ashtadhatu in padmasan posture	2016	
Gommateshvara statue in Badagaon	Bahubali	Bada Gaon, Baghpat	Uttar Pradesh	9.5	31		2018	
Rishabha statue at Trimurti temple	Rishabhanatha	Borivali	Mumbai	9.5	31	Rishabhanatha statue at Trimurti temple in Sanjay Gandhi National Park	2014	
Bharata statue, Connaught Place	Bharata chakravartin	New Delhi	Delhi	9.5	31	largest statue of Bharata chakravartin	2021	
Kubereshwar Mahadev	Shiva	baroda	Gujarat	9.45	31.0	Second Tall Statue In baroda, Gujarat	2008	
Statue of Parashurama	Parashurama	Kaduthuruthy, Kottayam	Kerala	9.14	30.0	Statue of Parashurama located at Mangomeadows Agriculture Theme Park	2015	
Bahubali statue at Trimurti temple	Bahubali & Bharata	Borivali	Mumbai	8.5	28	Bahubali statue at Trimurti temple in Sanjay Gandhi National Park	2014	
Shantinath Jain Teerth Statue	Munisuvrata	Indapur	Maharashtra	8.23	27.0		2011	
Neelkanth Varni (Swaminarayan as Teenage Yogi)	Neelkanth Varni	BAPS Swaminarayan Akshardham, New Delhi	Delhi	8.23	27.0	A beautiful 27 ft. high bronze murti (Statue) of Neelkanth Varni stands in a determined pose	2005	
Tirthankar Padmaprabh of Padampura	Padmaprabha	Shivdaspura, Jaipur	Rajasthan	8.23	27.0	The tallest statue of Padmaprabha.		
Statue of Adinath	Adinath	Sarvodaya temple, Amarkantak	Madhya Pradesh	7.32	24.0			
Statue of Mahavira	Mahavira	Shri Mahaveerji	Rajasthan	7.32	24.0			
Kamadev Bahubali of Ponnur Malai	Bahubali	Ponnur Hills, Tiruvannamalai district	Tamil Nadu	7.32	24.0		2023	
Bahubaleshwar	Bahubali	Greater Noida	Uttar Pradesh	7	23	Monolithic Granite Statue	2025	
Statue of Shirdi Sai in Nemli	Sai Baba of Shirdi	Nemli	Andhra Pradesh	7	23		2011	
Mandargiri Jain Temple	Chandraprabha	Tumkur District	Karnataka	6.4	21		2011	
Hanuman Statue	Hanuman	Biramitrapur, Sundergarh	Odisha	6	20	A kneeling hanuman	2011	
Kanakagiri Bahubali Statue	Bahubali	Kanakagiri	Karnataka	5.5	18		2017	

== Under-construction, Proposed/Planned ==
- Three more statues by the Isha Foundation, which already has 34 meter Adiyogi Shiva statue at Coimbatore, plans to erect such statues in three more locations in the eastern, western and northern parts of India—in Varanasi, Mumbai and Delhi.

Statue	Depicts	Locations	State	Height		Notes
Statue	Depicts	Locations	State	m	ft	Notes
Lord Shiva (sitting) statue	Shiva	Jajpur	Odisha	37.49	123.0	To be the largest statue in the state
Statue of Mata Sita	Sita	Sitamarhi	Bihar	76.5	251	
Statue of Equality	B. R. Ambedkar	Mumbai	Maharashtra	107	351	
Reclining Buddha	Gautama Buddha	Gaya	Bihar	-	-	100 ft X 30 ft India's longest reclining Buddha
Statue of Lord Rama	Rama	Ayodhya	Uttar Pradesh	221	725	
Shiv Smarak	Chhatrapati Shivaji Maharaj	Mumbai	Maharashtra	212	696	
Statue of Lord Muruga	Kartikeya	Coimbatore	Tamil Nadu	56.0832	184.000	
Shri Adbhutnath Mahadev statue	Shiva	Delhi	Delhi	61.26	201.0	
Srikakulam Hanuman statue	Hanuman	Madapam, Narasannapeta mandal	Andhra Pradesh	53.6	176	
Statue of Purity	Tirthankara Munisuvrata	Bhora Kalan, Gurgaon	Haryana	46	151	
Maitreya Project	Maitreya Buddha	Bodh Gaya	Bihar	45	148	
Statue of Hindubhushan	Sambhaji	Pimpri-Chinchwad, Pune	Maharashtra	42.67	140.0	
Basaveshwara statue	Basava	Gadag	Karnataka	33.8	111	
Statue of Parshvanatha	Tirthankara Parshvanatha	Sama pond, Vadodara	Gujarat	30.5	100	
Vishvarupa Vishnu statue	Lord Vishnu's Vishvarupa-form	Ejipura, Bengaluru	Karnataka	32.9	108	
Statue of Oneness	Adi Shankara	Omkareshwar	Madhya Pradesh	32.9	108	
Mahavira Statue	Mahavira	Kamaldah	Bihar	32.9	108	72-foot statue seated on 36-foot lotus pedestal

== See also ==
- List of tallest statues
- List of tallest freestanding structures
- List of the tallest statues in the United States
- List of colossal sculpture in situ
- Sculpture in the Indian subcontinent
- New Seven Wonders of the World
- List of statues

== Sources ==
- Ambade, Dhiraj B. (2025). "Glorifying my gods: cultural politics of statue making, Hindu symbolism, and power iconography". Cultural Trends, Volume 34, 2025 - Issue 5.
- Jain, Kajri (2021). Gods in the Time of Democracy. Duke University Press.
- Outlook News Desk (2022). "From Sages To Politicians, Why We Love Building Statues Of Prominent Figures". Outlook India.
- Prasad, Indulata (2019). "Why giant statues of Hindu gods and leaders are making Muslims in India nervous". The Conversation.
