= List of tallest Hindu deity statues =

This list of tallest Hindu deity statues includes completed statues that are at least 4 m (13 ft) tall. The height values in this list are measured to the highest part of the murti, but exclude the height of any pedestal (plinth), or other base platform as well as any mast, spire, or other structure that extends higher than the tallest figure in the monument.

The definition of statue for this list is a free-standing sculpture (as opposed to a relief), representing one or more people or animals (real or mythical), in their entirety or partially (such as a bust). Heights stated are those of the statue itself and (separately) the total height of the monument that includes structures the statue is standing on or holding. Monuments that contain statues are included in this list only if the statue fulfills these and the height criteria.

== Existing statues ==
As of 2022, the main table includes 101 statues of height 4 m (13 ft) or taller.

Statue	Image	Depicts	Location	Country	Height meters (feet)	Notes	Completed	Coordinates
Statue of Belief		Shiva	Ganesh Tekri, Nathdwara, Rajasthan	India	112 m (367 ft)	Funded by Miraj Group. Construction began August 2012	2021	24.92041°N 73.81701°E
Garuda Wisnu Kencana statue		Vishnu riding Garuda	Bali	Indonesia	76 m (249 ft)	Tallest statue in Indonesia. The total height of the monument is 122 m including the 46 m pedestal base.	2018	8.81404°S 115.1670°E
Statue of Equality		Ramanuja	Hyderabad	India	65.8 m (216 ft)	Construction started in 2014 by Chinna Jeeyar swamy and his religious trust.	2018	17.1860°N 78.3332°E
Panchamukhi Anjaneya		Hanuman (Hanumanta, Anjaneya)	Kunigal, Karnataka	India	49 m (161 ft)	Oct-2014 to mid-2022 was construction. Width of the statue is 108'. 85,000 bags of cement used	2022	23R9+C73, Rd, Kunigal, Karnataka 572130
Muthumalai Murugan Statue		Murugan	Valapadi, Salem, Tamil Nadu	India	44.5 m (146 ft)	Tallest Statue of Murugan in the world	2020	11.65647°N 78.48550°E
Kailashnath Mahadev Statue		Shiva	Bhaktapur District, Bagmati Province	Nepal	43.5 m (143 ft)		2010	27.64602°N 85.47477°E
Maa Vaishno Devi Statue		Vaishno Devi/Durga	Vrindavan, Uttar Pradesh	India	43 m (141 ft)	The statue of 141 feet high along with a small sitting statue of Hanuman is located in Vrindavan, Uttar Pradesh, India.	2010	27.5608920°N 77.6322786°E
Batu Caves Murugan Statue		Murugan	Batu Caves, Gombak	Malaysia	42.7 m (140 ft)	Tallest statue in Malaysia.	2006	3.23748°N 101.68398°E
Veera Abhaya Anjaneya Hanuman Swami		Hanuman	Vijayawada, Andhra Pradesh	India	41 m (135 ft)		2003	17.22968°N 82.12263°E
Ganesha Statue		Ganesha	Khlong Khuean District, Chachoengsao Province	Thailand	39 m (128 ft)	Bronze Ganesh at the Khlong Khuean Ganesh International Park	2012	
Shiva of Murudeshwara		Shiva	Murudeshwara, district of Uttara Kannada, Karnataka	India	37 m (121 ft)		2006	14.09365°N 74.48369°E
Sarveshwar Mahadev Statue		Shiva	Vadodara, Gujarat	India	36.58 m (120.0 ft)		2021	
Repuru Saibaba Statue		Sai Baba of Shirdi	Repuru, Kakinada, Andhra Pradesh	India	35.5 m (116 ft)	Tallest statue of Sai Baba in the world	2015	16°57′18.3″N 82°11′18.8″E
Adiyogi Shiva statue		Shiva	Coimbatore, Tamil Nadu, India	India	34.2 m (112 ft)	Largest and tallest bust in the world, made up of 500 tonnes of steel. Height of 112 ft symbolically denotes that Adiyogi gave 112 ways to explore the human system.	2017	10.97267°N 76.74050°E
Basaveshwara statue		Basava	Gadag, Karnataka	India	33.83 (111 ft)	It is the tallest statue of Basavanna in the world.	2015	
Hanuman Statue of Damanjodi	Hanuman Statue of Damanjodi	Hanuman	Damanjodi, Koraput, Odisha	India	33.1 (108.9 ft)	World's Third tallest Hanuman located at NALCO township, Damanjodi, Koraput	2017	
Statue of Shiva at Allahabad		Shiva	Allahabad, Uttar Pradesh	India	33 m (108 ft)	Situated on the banks of the holy river Ganga, this grand statue is often referred to as the Symbol of Allahabad—the holy land of Sangam. The statue is located at the place where holy Kumbh Mela takes place.	2010	
Sankat Mochan Dham		Hanuman	Karol Bagh, New Delhi	India	33 m (108 ft)		2008	28.64486°N 77.19791°E
Mangal Mahadev		Shiva	Ganga Talao lake	Mauritius	33 m (108 ft)		2007	20.4164°S 57.4924°E
Durga Mata Murti		Durga	Ganga Talao lake	Mauritius	33 m (108 ft)		2017	20.4164°S 57.4924°E
Sri Venkateswara Statue		Venkateswara	Hari Hara Devasthanam, Seizieme Mille	Mauritius	33 m (108 ft)		2017	20.4164°S 57.4924°E
Sri Tallapaka Annamacharya		Annamacharya	Tallapaka, Andhra Pradesh	India	33 m (108 ft)	Telugu poet and musician	2008	14.20106°N 79.16151°E
Basaveshwara statue	Basavanna Statue in Karnataka	Basava	Basavakalyan, Karnataka	India	33 (108 ft)	Tallest statue of Basava in the world	2014	
Shri Hanuman Jakhu		Hanuman	Shimla, Himachal Pradesh	India	33 m (108 ft)	Located at 8,500 ft (2,600 m) above sea level	2010	31.1009°N 77.1834°E
Kondamadugu Sai Baba Statue		Sai Baba of Shirdi	Kondamadugu	India	32 m (105 ft)		2017	17.493075°N 78.772747°E
Hanuman in Nandura		Hanuman	Maharashtra	India	32 m (105 ft)		2005	20.83473°N 76.44994°E
Hanuman Murti in Shahjahanpur		Hanuman	Shahjahanpur, Uttar Pradesh	India	32 m (104 ft)	Standing	2013	27.86171°N 79.91853°E
Simariya Hanuman in Chhindwara		Hanuman	Chhindwara, Madhya Pradesh	India	31.2 m (102 ft)	Standing	2015	21.9085°N 78.8968°E
Mangal Mahadev		Shiva	Gangtan, Sampla Beri Road Haryana	India	30.8 m (101 ft)	Standing Statue	2012	28.76112°N 76.64684°E
Shiva of the Har Ki Pauri		Shiva	Haridwar, Uttarakhand	India	30.5 m (100 ft)		2012	29.95873°N 78.1748°E
Abbirajupalem Hanuman Statue		Hanuman	Doddipatla, Andhra Pradesh	India	30 metres (98 ft)	Standing Hanuman	2013	
Hanuman Statue		Hanuman	Erravaram, Andhra Pradesh	India	29.6 metres (97 ft)	Standing Hanuman	1992	
Shri Hanuman Dham		Hanuman	Basi Kiratpur, Uttar Pradesh	India	27 metres (89 ft)	Hanuman Dham Statue created by Pradeep Chauhan	1997	
Siddheswar Dham		Shiva	Namchi, Sikkim	India	26.5 (87 ft)	It offers a statue of Shiva encircled by a dozen Jyotirlingas and replicas of the four Dhams of the country.	2011	
Chinmaya Ganadhish		Ganesha	Kolhapur, Maharashtra	India	26 metres (85 ft)	Idol at Chinmaya Sandeepany Ashram	2001	
Sivagiri of Bijapur		Shiva	Bijapur, Karnataka	India	26 metres (85 ft)		2006	
Karyasiddhi Hanuman Statue		Hanuman	Carapichaima, Trinidad	Trinidad and Tobago	26 m (85 ft)	Standing	2001	
Nageshwar Statue		Shiva	Nageshwar Jyotirling, Dwarka, Gujarat	India	25 (82 ft)			
Omkareshwar Shiva Statue		Shiva	Omkareshwar Temple, Khandwa, Madhya Pradesh	India	25 (82 ft)		2023	
Khajjiar Shiva Statue		Shiva	Khajjiar, Himachal Pradesh	India	24.69 (81 ft)		2010	
Statue of Shiva (Meinindranaatha Swami)		Shiva	Keeramangalam, Tamil Nadu	India	24.68 (81 ft)		2016	
Hanuman of Ram Tirath temple		Hanuman	Amritsar, Punjab	India	24.5 metres (80 ft)	Ram Tirath temple		
Deshapriya Park Durga Statue		Durga	Deshapriya Park, Kolkata, West Bengal	India	24.38 metres (80.0 ft)		2015	
Hanuman Statue		Hanuman	Samalkota, Andhra Pradesh	India	24.07 metres (79.0 ft)	Standing Hanuman		
Reclining Ganesha of Wat Saman Rattanaram		Ganesha	Wat Saman Ratanaram, Chachoengsao	Thailand	24 metres (79 ft)	The second tallest statue of Ganesha in Thailand and it is 16 metres tall and 24 metres long.		
Ramdurg Shiva Statue		Shiva	Dodamangadi, Belagavi District, Karnataka	India	23.77 metres (78.0 ft)		2018	
Shiva Statue		Shiva	Jabalpur, Madhya Pradesh	India	23.17 metres (76.0 ft)		2006	
Kote Anjaneya Statue		Hanuman	Tumkur, Karnataka	India	23 (75 ft)		2005	
Hanuman Vatika		Hanuman	Rourkela, Orissa	India	23 metres (75 ft)	Second tallest statue of Hanuman	1994	
Ganapati Dham Temple		Ganesha	Bahadurgarh, Haryana	India	22.56 metres (74.0 ft)	Worlds tallest Ganesha Statue	2009	
Triveni Hanuman Mandir Statue		Hanuman	NH-162, Pali, Rajasthan, Rajasthan	India	21.94 metres (72.0 ft)	Statue of Hanuman with Rama and Lakshmana	2010	
Maruthanarmadam Aanjaneyar Kovil Statue		Hanuman	NH-162, Jaffna, Sri Lanka	India	21.94 metres (72.0 ft)	Statue of Hanuman	2010	
Devika Shiva Statue		Shiva	Udhampur, Udhampur District, Jammu and Kashmir,	India	21.64 metres (71.0 ft)		2014	
Damodar Lila Statue		Krishna	Sunwal, Nawalparasi District, Lumbini Province	Nepal	21.64 metres (71.0 ft)	Standing statue of Krishna in infant form near to Mahakavi Devkota Campus.	2019	
Sankat Mochan Hanuman Statue in Punjab		Hanuman	Phillaur, Punjab	India	21 metres (69 ft)	Standing Statue		
Gangadhareshwara Statue		Shiva	Azhimala Temple, Kovalam, Kerala	India	20.7264 metres (68.000 ft)	Tallest statue of Shiva in Kerala and tallest statue of Gangadhareshwara form of Shiva in India.	2020	
Ardhanarishvara Statue		Shiva	Johannesburg, Gauteng	South Africa	20 metres (66 ft)	Tallest Hindu statue in South Africa and the tallest Ardhanarishvara form of Shiva statue in the world.	2013	
Hanuman Statue in New Delhi		Hanuman	Jhandewalan Temple, New Delhi, Delhi	India	20 metres (66 ft)	Standing Statue	2007	
Kempfort Shiva Statue		Shiva	Shivoham Shiva Temple, Bangalore, Karnataka	India	20 metres (66 ft)	The idol of Shiva was created by the sculptor Kashinath.	1995	
Shiva Statue at Bhanjanagar Reservoir		Shiva	Bhanjanagar, Odisha	India	18.6 metres (61 ft)		2013	
Shri Chamundeshwari Statue		Chamundeshwari/Durga	Shri Chamundeshwari Basavappanavara Temple Gowdagere, Channapatna, Karnataka	India	18.3 metres (60 ft)	Located in the premises of Shri Chamundeshwari Basavappanavara Temple in Gowdagere, this statue is the world's tallest statue of Goddess Chamundeshwari who is considered to be one of the forms of the Goddess Durga or Adishakti.	2021	
Hanuman Statue at Puttaparthi		Hanuman	Puttaparthi, Andhra Pradesh	India	18 metres (59 ft)	Found on top of the Vidya Giri Hill overlooking the Sri Sathya Sai International Hillview Stadium.	1985	
Hanuman Statue at Kondagattu		Hanuman	Jagtial, Telangana	India	17.06 metres (56.0 ft)	Standing Hanuman statue	2003	
Sai Baba Statue at Machilipatnam		Sai Baba of Shirdi	Machilipatnam, Andhra Pradesh	India	16.4 metres (54 ft)		2007	
"King of Sarangpur" Hanumanji statue		Hanuman	Hanuman temple, Salangpur	India	16.4 metres (54 ft)		2023	
Blenheim Hanuman Statue		Hanuman	Blenheim, Leguan	Guyana	15.85 metres (52.0 ft)		2017	
Shri Bhaktha Anjaneyar		Hanuman	Vedasandur, Dindigul district, Tamil Nadu	India	15.54 metres (51.0 ft)		2008	
Bangeswar Mahadev		Shiva	Salkia, Howrah, West Bengal	India	15.54 metres (51.0 ft)	Tallest Shiva Idol In Eastern India Bank of River Ganges	2016	
Pumdikot Shiva Statue		Shiva	Kaski district, Gandaki	Nepal	15.5 m (51.0 ft)		2021	
Mangal Murti Hanuman Ji Statue		Hanuman	Vishnu Mandir, Richmond Hill, Ontario, Greater Toronto Area	Canada	15.24 metres (50.0 ft)		2016	
Hanuman Statue at Bathinda		Hanuman	Bathinda, Punjab	India	15.24 metres (50.0 ft)	Hanuman Chowk		
Hanuman statue at Ramayana cave		Hanuman	Batu Malai Sri Subramaniar Temple, Batu caves, Gombak, Selangor	Malaysia	15 m (50 ft)		2001	
45 ft Sri Abhaya Anjaneya Swamy		Hanuman	Hanuman Junction, Andhra Pradesh	India	13.7 metres (45 ft)	Tallest Hanuman in Hanuman Junction	2015	
45 ft Sri Abhaya Anjaneya Swamy		Hanuman	Shri Vishnu Temple Society, Chatsworth, eThekwini, KwaZulu-Natal	South Africa	13 metres (43 ft)	Tallest Hanuman statue and second tallest Hindu statue in South Africa	2010	
Statue of Hanuman at Dharwad		Hanuman	Hanuman Temple Line Bazar, Dharwad, Karnataka	India	12.9 metres (42 ft)	Tallest Hanuman statue in North Karnataka	2016	
Vekkaliamman Statue		Kali/Durga	Vekkali Amman Temple, Woraiyur, Thiruchirappalli, Tamil Nadu	India	12.8 metres (42 ft)		9th century	
Balamurugan Statue		Murugan	Saveetha Institute of Medical And Technical Sciences, Tamil Nadu	India	12.2 metres (40 ft)	Monolith sculpture of a young Bala Murugan	2020	
Subramani Swamy Temple		Murugan	Arulmigu Subramanyaswamy Temple, Pachaimalai, Gobichettipalaiyam, Modachur	India	12.2 metres (40 ft)		1980	11.449374475419°N 77.446253654355°E
Jourian Shani Dev Statue		Shani	Jourian, Jammu, Jammu and Kashmir	India	11.89 metres (39.0 ft)		2017	
Anjaneyar statue, Sri Rama Bhaktha Anjaneyar temple		Hanuman	Ayipettai, Cuddalore, Tamil Nadu	India	11.28 metres (37.0 ft)		2015	
Horse statue		Vahana of Aiyanar	Sri Perungaraiyadi Meenda Ayyanar Temple, Kulamangalam, Alangudi taluk, Pudukkottai, Tamil Nadu	India	11.27 metres (37.0 ft)	The structure is so unique in its construction and Devotees believe that it is the biggest Horse idol in the world.	18th century	
Mounagiri Hanuman Statue		Hanuman	Anantapur, Andhra Pradesh	India	11 metres (36 ft)	Tallest monolithic statue in South India located at Mounagiri Global Trust	2010	
Statue of Hanuman in Saifai		Hanuman	Saifai, Etawah district, Uttar Pradesh	India	10.7 metres (35 ft)		2016	
Agasthyacodu Mahadeva Statue		Shiva	Agasthyacodu Mahadeva Temple, Anchal, Kollam, Kerala	India	10.67 metres (35.0 ft)		2012	
Viswaroopa Bhakta Anjaneya Statue		Hanuman	Nanganallur, Chennai, Tamil Nadu	India	9.8 metres (32 ft)		1989	
Kempfort Ganesha Statue		Ganesha	Shivoham Shiva Temple, Bangalore, Karnataka	India	20 metres (66 ft)	Unveiled by Dada J.P. Vaswani.	2003	
Konanatha Swami Statue		Shiva	Koneswaram Temple, Trincomalee, Trincomalee District	Sri Lanka	9.75 metres (32.0 ft)	The statue of Shiva was reconstructed in 2018.	2018	
Kubereshwar Mahadev		Shiva	Baroda, Gujarat	India	9.45 metres (31.0 ft)	Second tallest statue in Baroda, Gujarat	2008	
Statue of Parashurama		Parashurama	Kaduthuruthy, Kottayam, Kerala	India	9.14 metres (30.0 ft)	Statue of Parashurama located at Mangomeadows Agriculture Theme Park	2015	
Statue of God Shiva and Uma		Uma-mahesvara	God Shiva and Uma roundabout, Sihanoukville	Cambodia	9 m (30 ft) (17 tonnes)	A copper statue on a 6.15 m (20 ft) base. 15.15 m (50 ft) in total.	2021	10.532679°N 103.615240°E
Neelkanth Varni (Swaminarayan as Teenage Yogi)		Neelkanth Varni	Swaminarayan Akshardham (New Delhi), New Delhi, Delhi	India	8.23 metres (27.0 ft)	A beautiful 27 ft. high bronze murti (Statue) of Neelkanth Varni stands in a determined pose	2005	
Hanuman Statue of Hockessin		Hanuman	Hockessin, New Castle, Delaware	United States	7.62 metres (25.0 ft)		2020	
Statue of Shirdi Sai in Nemli		Sai Baba of Shirdi	Nemali, Andhra Pradesh	India	7 metres (23 ft)		2011	
Four-face-Brahma		Brahma	Siem Reap–Angkor International Airport, Siem Reap Angkor	Cambodia	7 m (23 ft) (6 tonnes)	Four-face Brahma made of copper.	2023	13.37528°N 104.22083°E
Hanumanji Moorti		Hanuman	Glenview, Illinois	United States	6.4 metres (21 ft)		2014	
Statue of God Skanda on a peacock		God Skanda	Sihanoukville	Cambodia	6.18 m (20.3 ft)	A copper statue on a 6.18 m (20 ft) base. 12.36 m (41 ft) in total.	2022	10.60695°N 103.51620°E
Hanuman Statue at Biramitrapur		Hanuman	Biramitrapur, Sundergarh, Odisha	India	6 metres (20 ft)	A kneeling hanuman	2011	
Hanuman Statue at Namakkal Anjaneyar Temple		Hanuman	Namakkal, Tamil Nadu	India	5.5 metres (18 ft)	More than 1500 years old Namakkal Sri Anjaneyar temple	5th century	
Statue of Spirituality		Shiva	Char Dham, Vrindavan, Vrindavan, Uttar Pradesh	India	5.5 m (18 ft)	Second tallest sitting statue in world and second tallest Shiv tallest in India	2025	27.5596790°N 77.6309713°E
Embassy of Indonesia in Embassy Row, Washington, D.C. Saraswati (sculpture)		Saraswati/Durga	Embassy Row, Washington, D.C.	United States	4.9 metres (16 ft)	The work was created by multiple Balinese sculptors and installed in 2013. The 16-foot (4.9 m) gold and white statue depicts Saraswati standing on a lotus with three young students at her feet, one of which is Barack Obama.	2013	
Rishikesh Shiva Statue		Shiva	Parmarth Niketan Ashram, Rishikesh, Uttarakhand	India	4.27 metres (14.0 ft)			

=== By country/region ===
Rank	Country	Number of statues
1	India	74
2	Cambodia, Mauritius, Nepal, United States	3
6	Malaysia, South Africa, Thailand	2
9	Canada, Guyana, Indonesia, Sri Lanka, Trinidad and Tobago	1
	Total	101

Rank	Affiliation	Number of statues
1	Hanuman	39
2	Shiva	29
3	Durga	6
4	Ganesha	5
5	Murugan, Sai Baba of Shirdi	4
7	Basava	2
8	Annamacharya, Brahma, Chamundeshwari/Durga, God Skanda, Kali/Durga, Krishna, Neelkanth Varni, Parashurama, Ramanuja, Saraswati/Durga, Shani, Uma-mahesvara, Vahana of Aiyanar, Vaishno Devi/Durga, Venkateswara, Vishnu riding Garuda	1
	Total	101

== Proposed or under construction ==
Statue	Depict	Location	Country	Height m (ft)	Notes	Planned completion date	Coordinates	Ref
Statue of Rama	Rama	Ayodhya, Uttar Pradesh	India	151 m (495 ft)	Total structure height to be 221 metres (725 ft), including an overhead umbrella and the statue's pedestal.	2023		
Statue of Mata Sita	Sita	Sitamarhi, Mithila region, Bihar	India					
Hanuman Statue	Hanuman	Hanuman statue, Kishkindha (Hampi)	India	65 m (213 ft)				
Srikakulam Hanuman statue	Hanuman	Madapam, Narasannapeta mandal, Andhra Pradesh	India	53.6 metres (176 ft)				

== See also ==
- Murti
- List of statues
- List of tallest Buddha statues
- List of tallest bridges
- List of tallest buildings
- List of tallest statues
- List of tallest structures
- List of the tallest statues in the United States
- List of the tallest statues in India
- List of colossal sculpture in situ
- New7Wonders of the World
- List of largest monoliths
