= Kakinada Rural mandal =

- Mandal
- Interactive map of Kakinada Rural mandal
- Location in Andhra Pradesh, India
- Coordinates: 16°57′04″N 82°15′10″E
- Country: India
- State: Andhra Pradesh
- District: Kakinada
- Headquarters: Kakinada

Area
  - Total: 74.23 km^{2} (28.66 sq mi)

Population (2011)
  - Total: 174,129
  - Density: 2,346/km^{2} (6,076/sq mi)

Languages
  - Official: Telugu
- Time zone: UTC+5:30 (IST)

Kakinada Rural mandal is one of the 21 mandals in the Kakinada district of the state of Andhra Pradesh, India. It has its headquarters at Kakinada. The mandal is bounded by Samalkota mandal, Pedapudi mandal, Karapa mandal, Kothapalle mandal and waters of Bay of Bengal.

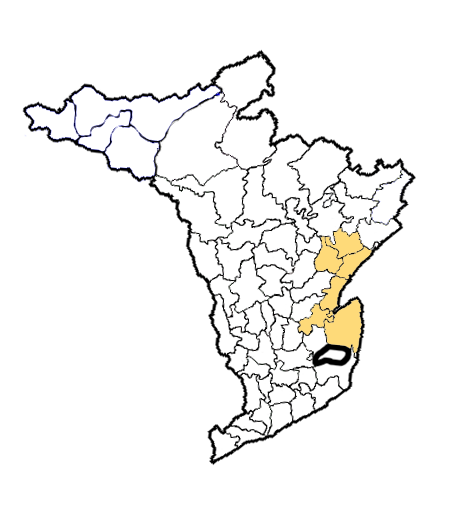
Kakinada revenue division in East Godavari district

== Demographics ==
As of 2011 census, the mandal had a population of 174,129. The total population constitute, 87,018 males and 87,111 females —a sex ratio of 1001 females per 1000 males. 17,978 children are in the age group of 0–6 years, of which 9,086 are boys and 8,892 are girls —a ratio of 979 per 1000. The average literacy rate stands at 78.39% with 122,399 literates. Sarpavaram is the most populated village and Penumarthi is the least populated village in the mandal.

== Villages ==
Kakinada (rural) mandal consists of 10 villages. The following are the list of villages in the mandal:

1. Ganganapalle
2. Kovvada
3. Kovvuru
4. Nemam
5. Panduru
6. Penumarthi
7. Repuru
8. Sarpavaram
9. Thammavaram
10. Thimmapuram
11. Surya Rao Peta

== Government and politics ==
Kakinada (rural) mandal is under Kakinada Rural (Assembly constituency) which in turn is a part of Kakinada (Lok Sabha constituency), one of the 25 Lok Sabha constituencies representing Andhra Pradesh. The present MLA is Kurasala Kanna Babu, who won the 2019 Andhra Pradesh Legislative Assembly election representing YSR Congress Party.
