= Ravuri Bharadhwaja =

Indian writer (1927–2013)

Ravuri Bharadwaja
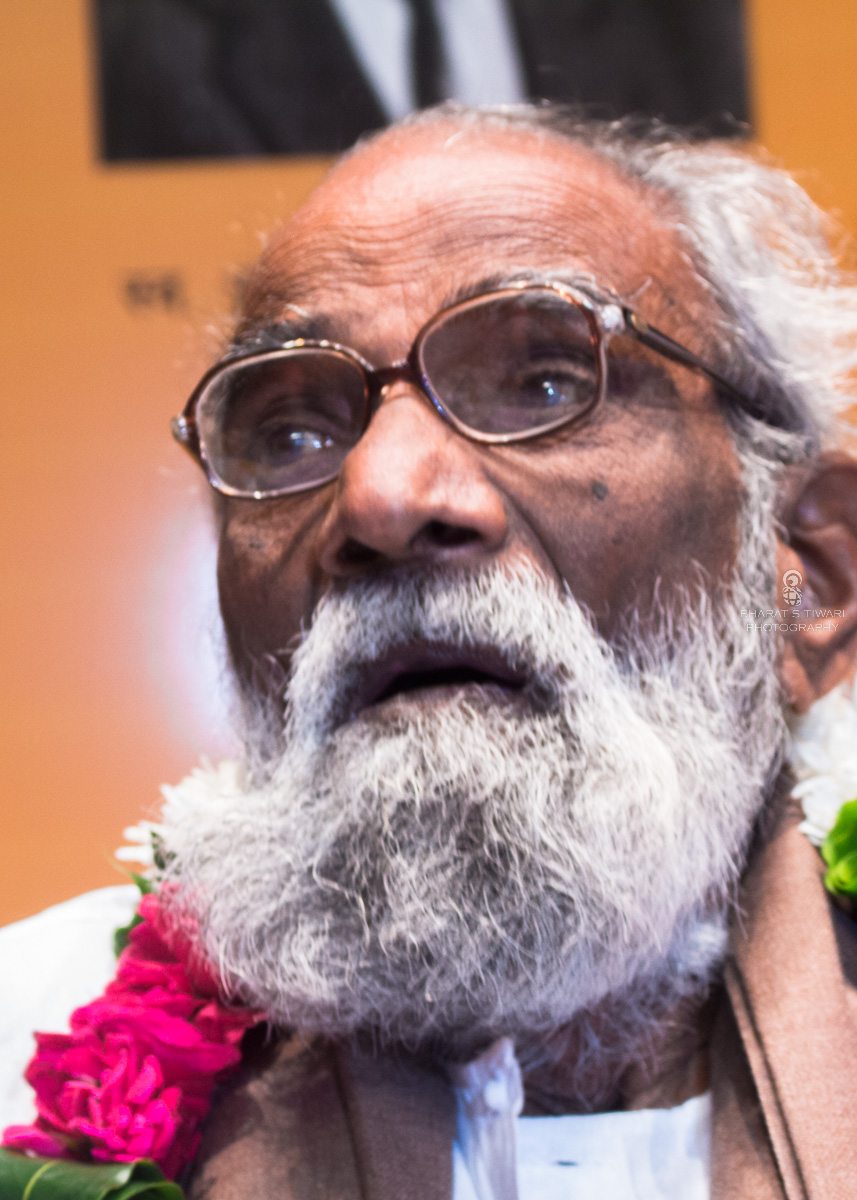
- Ravuri Bharadhwaja
- Born: 5 July 1927; Moguluru, Krishna District, India
- Died: 18 October 2013 (aged 86); Hyderabad, India
- Education: 7th grade
- Occupation: Writer
- Spouse: Kantham
- Children: 5 ( 4 sons and 1 daughter)
- Writing career
- Language: Telugu
- Notable work: Paakudu Raallu
- Notable awards: Jnanpith_Award

Rāvūri Bharadvāja (1927 – 18 October 2013) was a Jnanpith award winning Telugu novelist, short-story writer, poet and critic. He wrote 37 collections of short stories, seventeen novels, four play-lets, and five radio plays. He also contributed profusely to children's literature. Paakudu Raallu, a graphic account of life behind the screen in film industry, is considered his magnum opus. Jeevana Samaram is another of his popular works.

He could not study beyond class 7 but earned fame through his short stories, poetry and critical reviews. He had done several odd jobs but later worked in weeklies and also in All India Radio.

Ravuri Bharadwaja was born as the eldest child to Ravuri Kottayya and Mallikamba in his maternal village. He was brought up in his native village, Tadikonda in Guntur district. At the age of 14, he left his house and stayed on in the village, on the banks of the village tank. He was supported by friendly and kind villagers for food, working as a farm labour, a construction worker and other menial jobs- which became subjects of his later stories. He received honorary doctorates, a Central Sahitya Akademi award and ultimately the Jnanpith award. He was only the third Telugu writer to be honoured with the country's highest literary award. He was awarded the 48th Jnanpith award for the year 2012 which was announced on 17 April 2013 for his contribution to Telugu literature through many notable works. He died in Hyderabad on 18 October 2013.

== Education ==
He was born in Moguluru village, Krishna District in the house of his maternal grandparents. He was educated till Class 7 only, in his native Tadikonda in Guntur district. However his books are used as course works in B.A, M.A and there have even been several PhD degrees awarded for research on his works. He got honorary doctorates from Andhra, Nagarjuna, Vignan and Jawaharlal Nehru Technological Universities for his literary prowess.

== Awards ==
Bharadhwaja has been twice awarded the State Sahitya Academy Award for Literature and in 1983 was the winner of the Central Sahitya Academy Award. In 1968, he was the inaugural recipient of the Gopichand Literary Award. He was conferred the Rajalakshmi Award for Literature in 1987 and the Lok Nayak Foundation's Literary Award in 2009. In 2013, Ravuri Bharadhwaja became the third Telugu author to be conferred the Jnanpith award for his contribution to Telugu literature.

== Works ==
He has 37 collections of short stories, 17 novels, six short novels for children and eight plays to his credit.

- Phantomy quintette and other stories, Translator Purush, India Balaji Grandha Mala, 1970
- Love's labour lost and other stories, Rāvūri Bharadvāja, Translator Purush, M. Seshachalam, 1975
- Ad infinitum: featurised poetic story, Rāvūri Bharadvāja, Balaji Grandhamala, 1987
- Kaumudi translated by Navnit Madrasi, 1988
- Un Aankhon ki katha: (short story). Bharatiya Jnanpith, 1991
- Ripple-marks: readings from Bharadwaja's Eegiac pentad

== Sources ==
- 60 years and after: about Dr. Ravuri Bharadwaja, Purush, s.n., 1987
- Telugulō smr̥ti sāhityaṃ-Bharadvāja racanalu: siddhānta vyāsaṃ, Vai. E. Viśālākṣmi, Śrīsatyasāyi Pracuraṇalu, 1998
