= Sivagiri =

Sivagiri may refer to:

- Sivagiri, Erode, a town in Tamil Nadu
- Sivagiri, Tenkasi, a town in Tamil Nadu
- Sivagiri, Kerala, where sage Sree Narayana Guru's tomb is located
- Shivagiri, an 85 feet tall statue of Lord Shiva in Bijapur, Karnataka
