= Statue of Krishna, Greater Noida =

Statue of Krishna in Uttar Pradesh, India

- Location: Gaur Yamuna City, Greater Noida, Uttar Pradesh, India
- Coordinates: 28.301329°N 77.5597902°E
- Type: Statue
- Height: 108 feet (33 m)

The Statue of Krishna, Greater Noida is a 108 foot statue of the major Hindu deity Krishna in Gaur Yamuna City, Greater Noida, Uttar Pradesh, India.
