= Vemulapalli =

- village
- Interactive map of Vemulapalli
- Location in Andhra Pradesh, India Vemulapalli (India)
- Coordinates: 18.13°N 83.19°E
- Country: India
- State: Andhra Pradesh
- District: Anantapur
- Talukas: Yellanur

Population (2001)
  - Total: 1,015

Languages
  - Official: Telugu
- Time zone: UTC+5:30 (IST)

Vemulapalli is a village in Kanchikancherla Mandal in Krishna district of Andhra Pradesh, India. Its actual name is 'DharaNi vemulapalli' - "Dharani Vemulapalli Dhamuna Sakshigaa"

== Demographics ==
As of 2001 India census, Vemulapalli has a population of 1015 in 247 households.

As per the 2011 census data, the total population of Vemulapalli is 2,131 residing in 558 households. The total population constitute 1,073 males and 1,058 females.

It is in 69 meters above sea level.
