= Kanchikacherla mandal =

- Mandal
- Interactive map of Kanchikacherla mandal
- Location in Andhra Pradesh, India
- Country: India
- State: Andhra Pradesh
- District: NTR
- Headquarters: Kanchikacherla

Area
  - Total: 173.85 km^{2} (67.12 sq mi)

Population (2011)
  - Total: 71,075
  - Density: 408.83/km^{2} (1,058.9/sq mi)

Languages
  - Official: Telugu
- Time zone: UTC+5:30 (IST)

Kanchikacherla mandal is one of the 20 mandals in NTR district of the Indian state of Andhra Pradesh. It is under the administration of Vijayawada revenue division and the headquarters are located at Kanchikacherla. The mandal is bounded Veerullapadu, Chanderlapadu and Ibrahimpatnam mandals. A portion of it lies on the banks of the Krishna River, separating it from Guntur district and also Munneru river separates it from Nandigama mandal.

== Towns and villages ==
As of 2011 census, the mandal has 16 settlements and all are villages.

The settlements in the mandal are listed below:

1. Amaravaram
2. Bathinapadu
3. Chevitikallu
4. Gandepalle
5. Ganiatukuru
6. Gottumukkala
7. Kanchikacherla †
8. Keesara
9. Kunikinapadu
10. Moguluru
11. Munnaluru
12. Paritala
13. Pendyala
14. Perakalapadu
15. Saidapuram
16. Seri
17. Vemulapalle

Note: †-Mandal headquarter
