= Vahelna Jain temple =

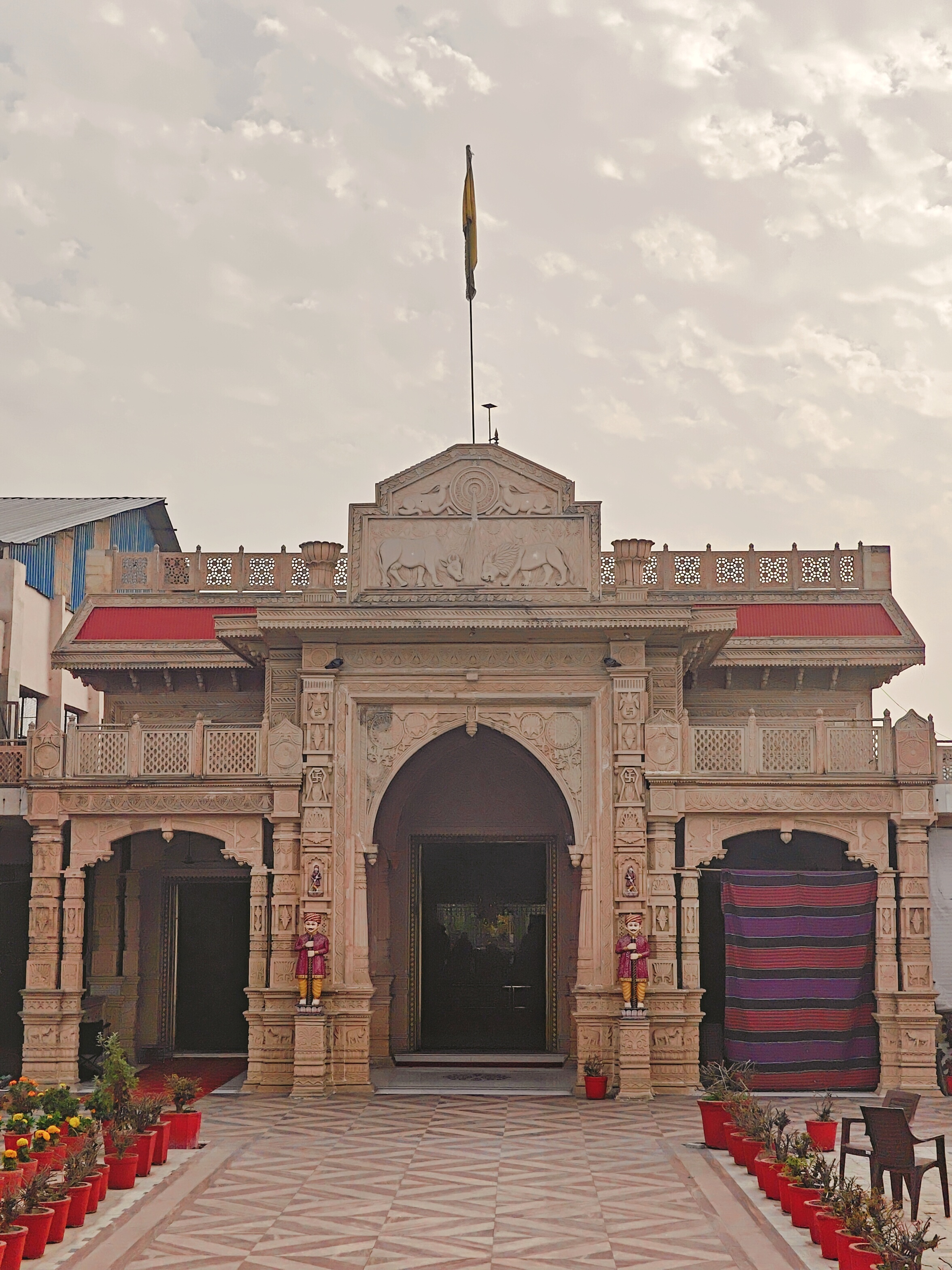
- Vahelna Jain temple

Religion
- Affiliation: Jainism
- Deity: Parshvanatha
- Festival: Mahavir Jayanti

Location
- Location: Vahelna, Muzaffarnagar, Uttar Pradesh
- Interactive map of Vahelna Jain temple
- Coordinates: 29°25′42.8″N 77°41′17″E

Architecture
- Established: 20th century
- Temple: 2

Vahelna Jain temple is a Jain temple Vahelna village in Muzaffarnagar district of Uttar Pradesh, India.

== About temple ==
Shri 1008 Parshvnath Digamber Jain Atishye Kshetra popularly known as Vahelna Jain Mandir is a major historical & religious place for Jains. The temple hosts the main statue of Lord Parshvanatha in padmasan posture with Manastambha and a 31 feet gigantic statue in outer garden. The temple campus also has facility of Naturopathy for patients. The annual day of the temple is celebrated on 2 October every year when a fair and a procession is held inviting around thousands of people.

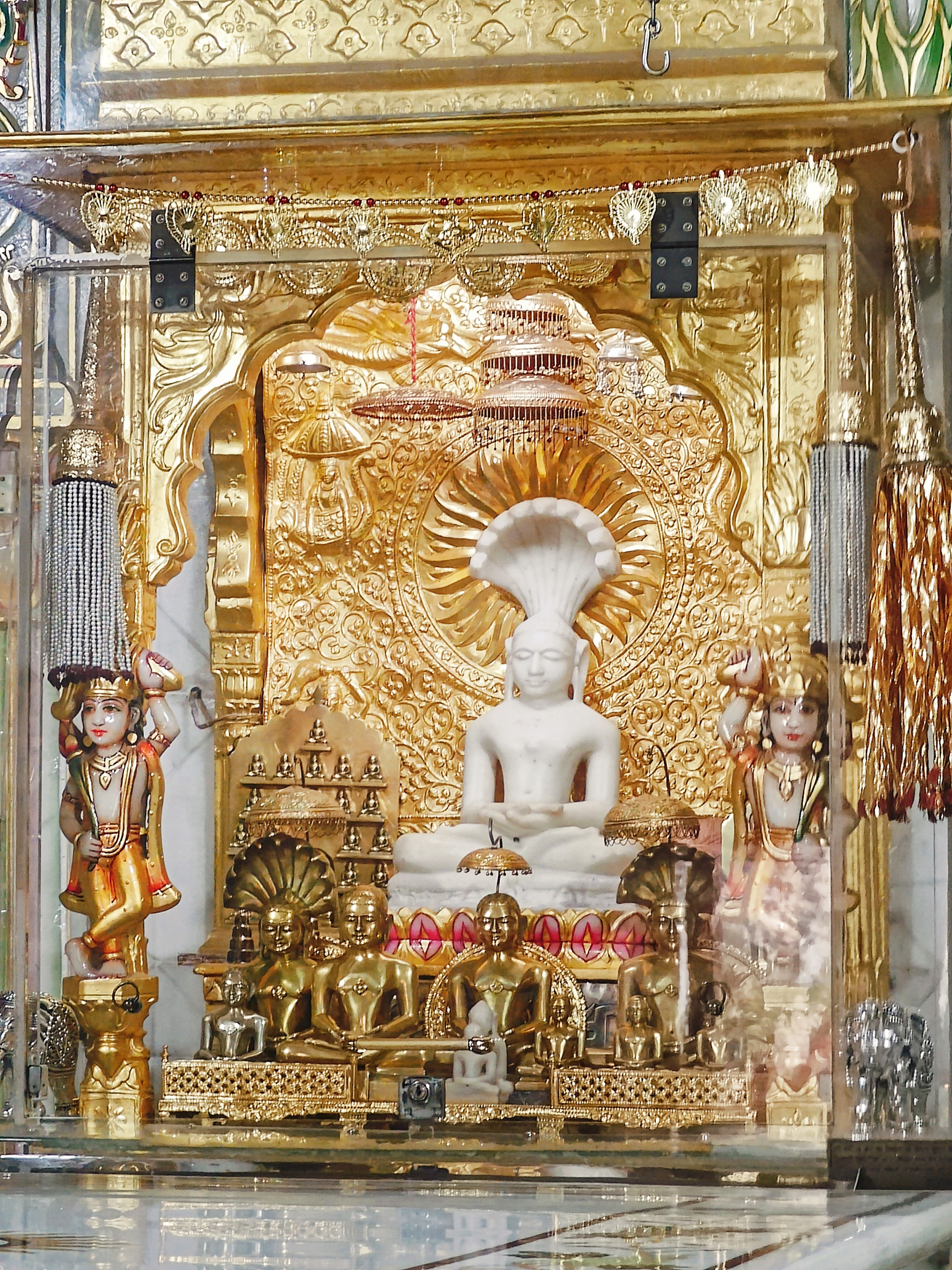
Mulnayak idol of Parshvanath

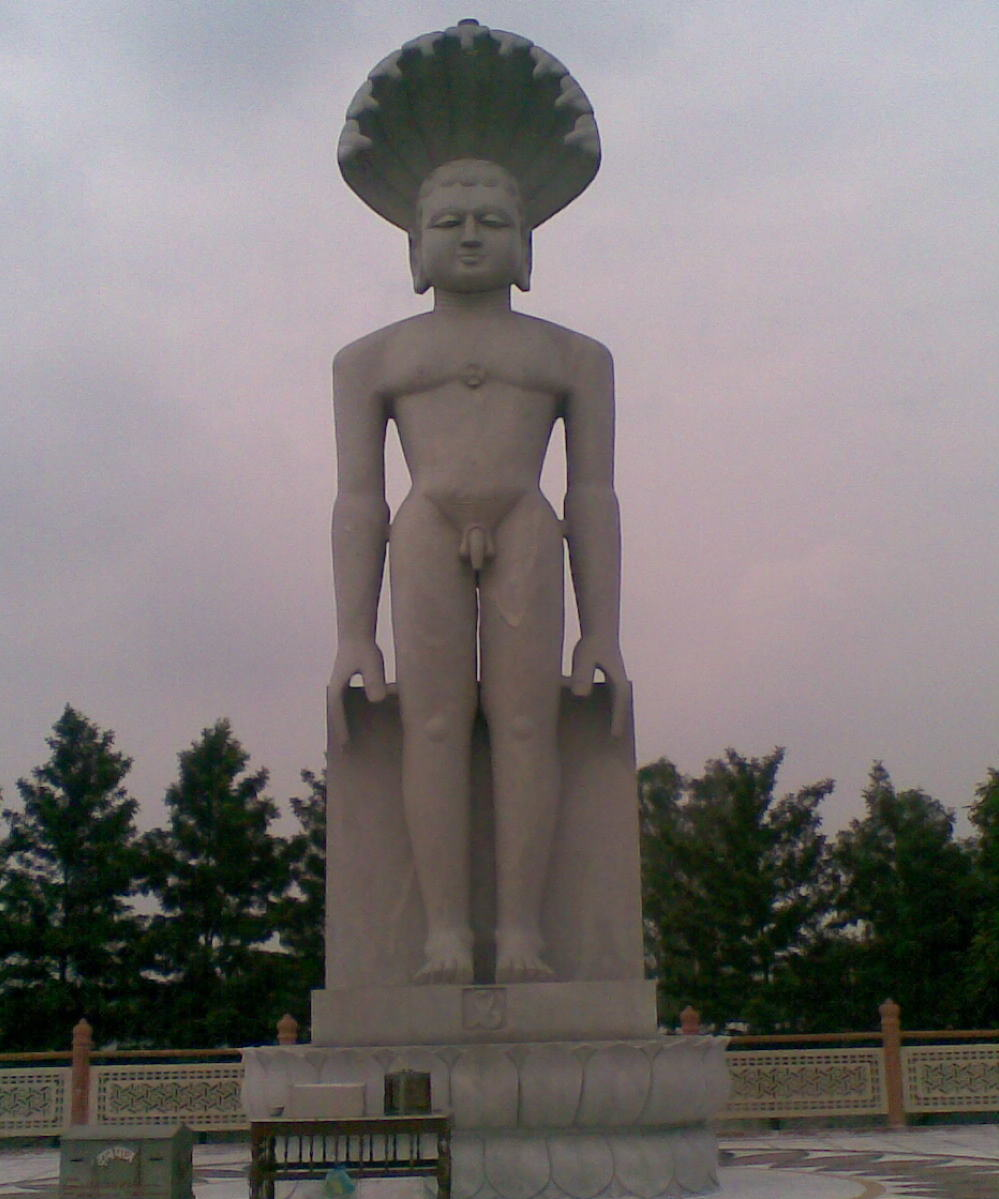
31 feet (9.4 m) statue of Parshvanath

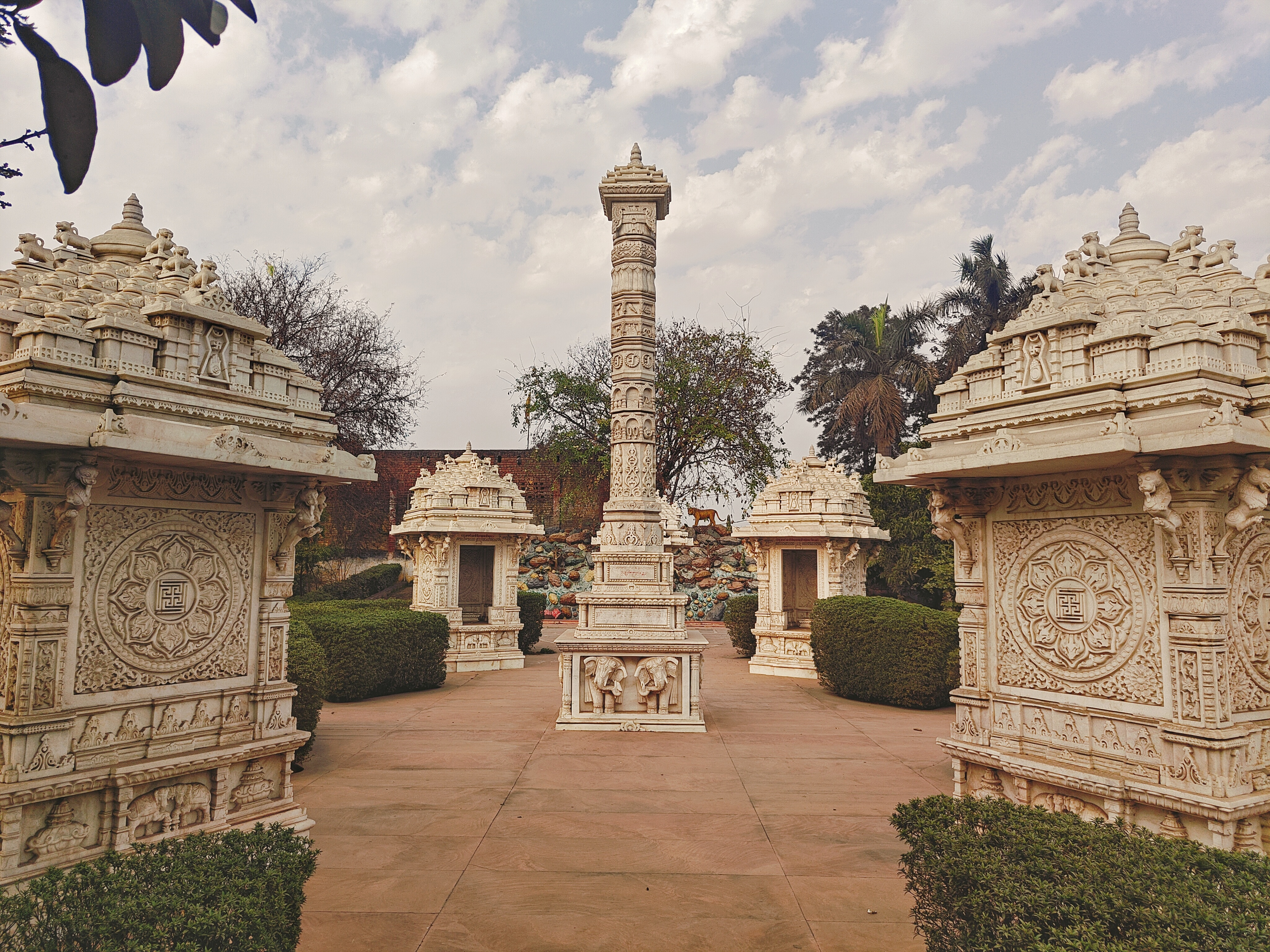
Charan chattri
