= Gaursons India =

Indian real estate company

Gaursons India Private Limited
- Type: Public
- Industry: Real estate, Construction, Hotels, Contracting, Education, Infrastructure.
- Founder: B. L. Gaur
- Headquarters: Ghaziabad, Uttar Pradesh, India,
- Key people: Manoj Gaur (chairman and managing director), Manju Gaur (director) and Sarthak Gaur (director)
- Website: www.gaursonsindia.com

Gaursons India Private Limited (GIL) is based in Delhi/NCR, India. It was incorporated in the year 1995 as a private limited company and was later on converted into a public limited company in year 2000. The company was founded by B.L. Gaur in the year 1995. Manoj Gaur is the managing director of the company.

Gaursons developed the township project Gaur City in West Greater Noida, which is home to about 25,000 families. In 2014, Gaursons launched a township project named Gaur Yamuna City with Bollywood stars Rishi Kapoor and Neetu Kapoor on Yamuna Expressway land purchased from Jaypee Group.
