= Paritala =

Paritalaa
- Village
- Interactive map of Paritalaa
- Location in Andhra Pradesh, India
- Country: India
- State: Andhra Pradesh
- District: NTR
- Mandal: Kanchikacherla

Area
  - Total: 19.98 km^{2} (7.71 sq mi)

Population (2011)
  - Total: 9,726
  - Density: 486.8/km^{2} (1,261/sq mi)

Languages
  - Official: Telugu
- Time zone: UTC+5:30 (IST)

Paritala is a village in the NTR district of the state of Andhra Pradesh, South India. It is located in Kanchikacherla mandal of Vijayawada revenue division.

== History ==
When the British achieved paramountcy over India, the Nizams were allowed to continue to rule their princely states as client kings. The Nizams retained internal power over Paritala village until 1948 when Paritala was integrated into the new Indian Union.

== Temples ==
A statue in depicting Hanuman called Veera Abhaya Anjaneya Hanuman Swami is located in the village. It was installed in 2003 and stands 135 feet (41 meters) tall. It is probably the tallest statue of Hanuman in the world.

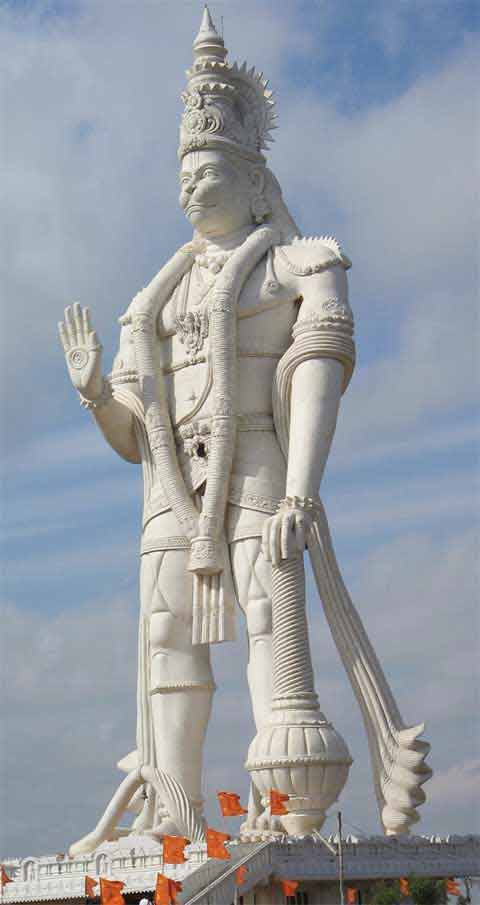
Hanuman statue on Paritala National Highway-9

== Diamonds ==
Paritala and the nearby villages such as Gani Atkur formed the area of rich diamond mines called Kollur Mines (Gani Kollur).

The Kollur mines were visited by Tavernier and William Methold who recorded that bullock cart loads of diamonds were being unearthed by 60,000 workers (1618 A.D.). Some of the most famous diamonds mined in Kollur mines, Gani Paritala and gani Atkur are:

- Koh-i-Noor (186 ct) – British Crown Jewels, London
- Great Mogul (787 ct) – Lost after Nadir Shah sacked Delhi
- Pitt or Regent (410 ct) – Apollo Gallery, Louvre Museum, Paris
- Orlov (300 ct) – Diamond Treasury, Kremlin, Moscow
- Nizam Diamond (440 ct) – Nizam's Treasury, Hyderabad
- Hope Diamond (67 ct) – Smithsonian Institution, Washington
- The Golconda (135 ct) – Dunklings Jewellers, Melbourne, Australia.
- Kolluru (63 ct) – Purchased by Tavernier and unknown location

During medieval times and British rule, Paritala-Kollur mines were famous for diamond mining. Diamonds such as Pitt and Regent diamonds were mined here. Other famous diamonds of Paritala mines include Darya-i-Noor, Dresden Green and Legrand Conde.
