= Chambal Mata Statue =

Statue in Kota, Rajasthan, India

Coordinates: 25°10′44″N 75°49′50″E

- Medium: Marble
- Dimensions: 42.5 m × 12 m × 10 m (1,670 in × 470 in × 390 in)
- Location: Kota

Chambal Mata Statue is a statue of Hindu goddess Chambal Mata at Chambal River front in Kota, Rajasthan, India. It is 42.5 metres tall, 12 metres wide, and 10 metres deep marble statue.
