= Shivoham Shiva Temple =

Hindu Temple in India

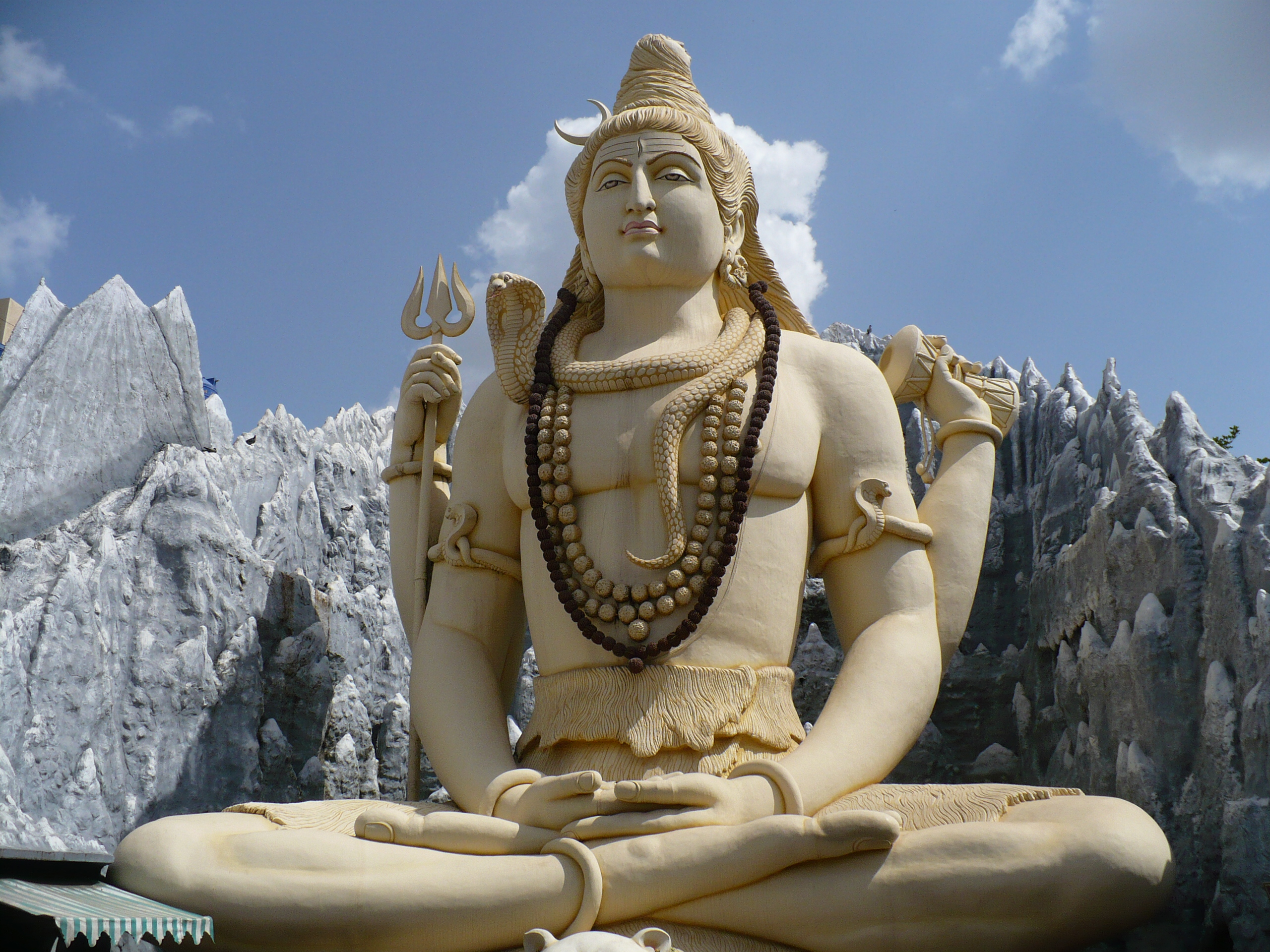
- Statue of Shiva at the Shivoham Shiva Temple

- Location within Bengaluru

Religion
- Affiliation: Hinduism
- District: Bangalore
- Deity: Shiva
- Festival: Maha Shivaratri

Location
- Location: Murugeshpalya
- State: Karnataka
- Country: India
- Interactive map of Shivoham Shiva Temple
- Coordinates: 12.958°N 77.654°E

Architecture
- Established: 1995
- Completed: 1995

Website
- www.shivohamshivatemple.org

Shivoham Shiva Temple is a Hindu temple, situated on Old Airport Road, Bangalore, India, dedicated to the Hindu deity Shiva. Built in 1995, it features a 65 feet (20 m) statue of Shiva. The temple attracts an estimated 500,000 worshippers and visitors each year, including between 100,000 and 150,000 on the occasion of Maha Shivaratri.

== History ==
Formerly known as the Shiv Mandir, the temple was consecrated by the Shankaracharya of Sringeri on 26 February 1995. The murti of Shiva was created by the sculptor Kashinath. The temple was renamed as the Shivoham Shiva Temple in 2016, when the focus of the temple shifted to helping people attain moksha by understanding the principles in ancient Vedic texts.

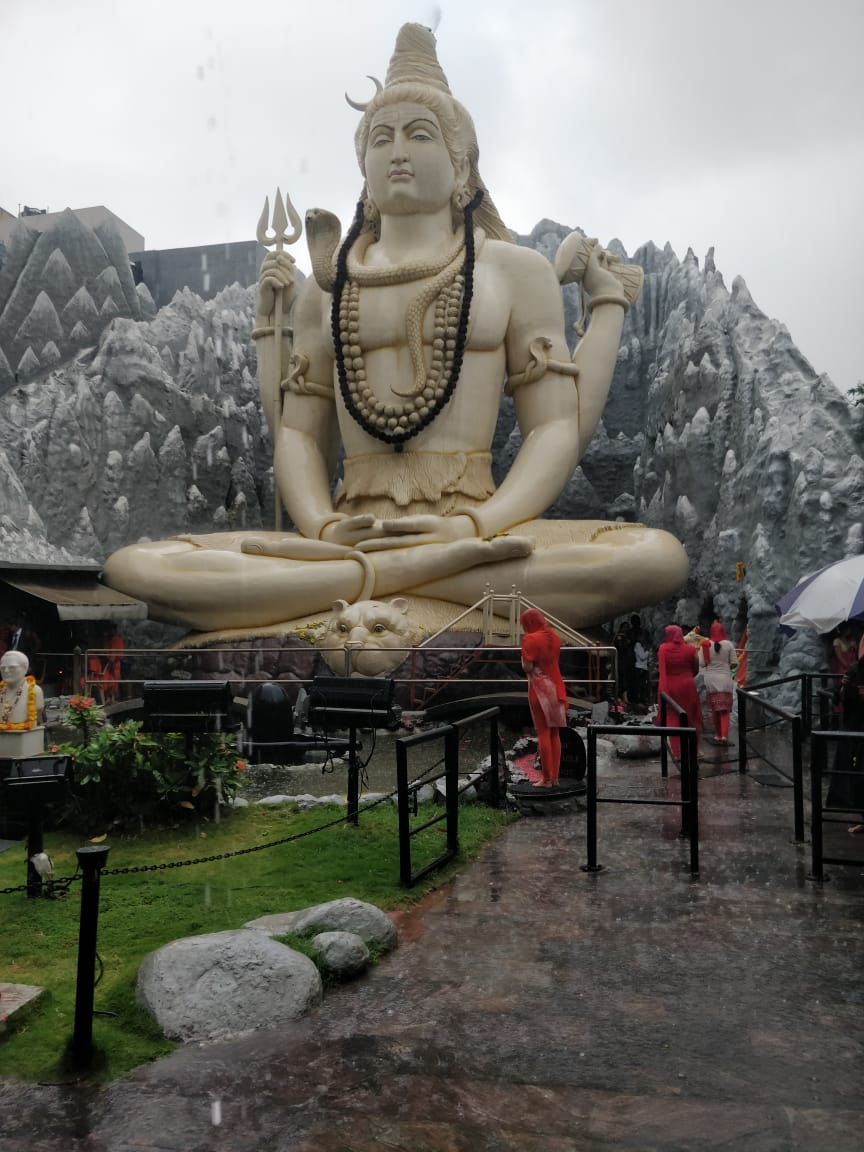
Shivoham Shiva Statue

== Features of the temple ==
The entrance to the temple has a 25-foot (7.6 m) lingam, the biggest in Bengaluru city.

The statue of Shiva depicts the River Ganges flowing out of his hair. The statue is seated in a meditative posture with his damaru and trishula, as mentioned in the Shiva Purana.

Besides the 65-foot statue of Shiva is a 32-foot statue of Ganesha, unveiled on 1 March 2003 by Dada J.P. Vaswani. Worshippers often tie saffron-coloured threads in front of Ganesha, in the hope that the deity would resolve their problems. Several healing stones are placed at the sanctuary facing the idol of Shiva. Devotees touch or embrace these healing stones in the hope of experiencing miracles.

== Activities ==
The Shiva pilgrimages to Amarnath Temple and Barah Jyotirling Yatra, have been recreated at the temple for those who are unable to travel to the distant location with its adverse climate.

The Amarnath Pancha Dhama Yatra at the temple takes visitors through a man-made cave on a stony, uneven terrain reminiscent of mountainous regions, where the five holy dhams are located: Haridwar, Rishikesh, Badrinath, Kedarnath, and Amarnath. There is also a replica of the ice lingam at Amarnath.

The 12 Jyotirlinga have also been recreated in an artificial cave at the temple, namely Somnath, Mallikarjun, Mahakaleswar, Omkareshwar, Kedarnath, Bhimashankar, Vishwanath Temple, Trimbakeshwar, Baidyanath, Nageshwar, Rameshwaram, and Grishneshwar.

== Maha Shivaratri at the temple ==
Maha Shivaratri is celebrated as a day of gratitude to Shiva. Maha Shivaratri celebrations at the temple include day and night festivities. Live bhajans and spiritual events, like Shiva Antakshari and jagarana, are organised. A laser-projected light and sound show is organised every year during the Maha Shivaratri.

== Humanitarian work ==
The temple supports the homeless by sharing its proceeds with A.i.R Humanitarian Homes, which operates in three locations in Bangalore and cater for up to 600 residents overall.
