= Moguluru =

- Village
- Interactive map of Moguluru
- Location in Andhra Pradesh, India
- Coordinates: 16°38′12.09″N 80°20′18.91″E
- Country: India
- State: Andhra Pradesh
- District: NTR
- Mandal: Kanchikacherla

Area
  - Total: 13.29 km^{2} (5.13 sq mi)

Population (2011)
  - Total: 5,578
  - Density: 419.7/km^{2} (1,087/sq mi)

Languages
  - Official: Telugu
- Time zone: UTC+5:30 (IST)

Moguluru is a village in NTR district of the Indian state of Andhra Pradesh. It is located in Kanchikacherla mandal of Vijayawada revenue division.
