= Sri Perungaraiyadi Meenda Ayyanar Temple =

Hindu temple in Tamil Nadu, India

Sri Perungaraiyadi Meenda Ayyanar Temple (Tamil: ஸ்ரீ பெருங்காரையடி மீண்ட ஐயனார் கோவில்) is one of the famous temple in Pudukkottai District , Tamil Nadu. It is located at Kulamangalam in Alangudi Taluk.

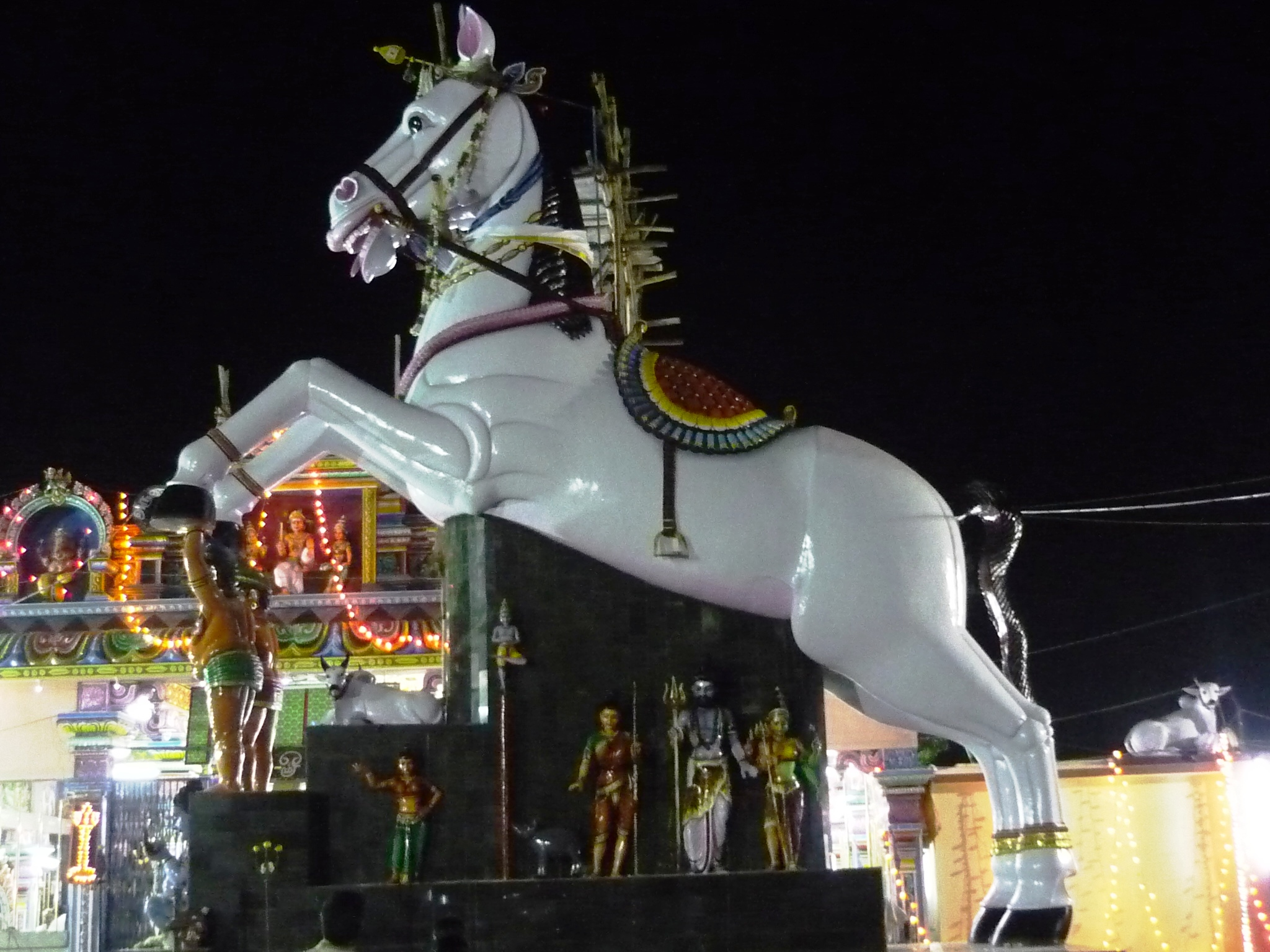
Kulamangalam Kuthirai (The Horse Idol)

== History ==
The temples history is dated back to 18th century. The exact year in which the temple is constructed is not known. The temple is currently maintained by the Tamil Nadu State Government.

Like in many Ayyanar temples, this temple also located in the border of the village as a means of securing and assuring wealth and health for all. The temple is in the bank of Villuni River.

== An elephant idol facing opposite the horse idol ==
As per the researchers, there used to be a big Elephant idol facing opposite to the Horse idol in this Temple. This was considered one of the significance of this Temple, since it is very rare practice to construct an Elephant idol in an Ayyanar (The Horse) Temple that too facing opposite of the Horse idol. It was learned that during one of the heavy monsoon season, the flood in the Villuni River had completely destroyed the Elephant idol thus by leaving only the base of the Elephant idol. This temple take in Tamil Nadu government .

== Worlds biggest horse idol ==
The Horse Idol is of mammoth 37 feet height with the front legs are in the Air and the others in the ground. The Idol is facing the South side. It's one of the finest creative of the ancient Tamilians. The structure is so unique in its construction and Devotees believe that it is the biggest Horse idol in the world.

== Masi Magam festival ==
As in many other temples in the Tamil Nadu, a two days grant festival is celerabted during Masi Magam or Masi Makam (It is one of the most important Tamil Hindu festival celebrated in the Tamil month of Masi, February – March by Tamilians).

Devotees from the nearby villages and from various part of the State gather in thousands on these days to worship the Ayyanar and get his blessings.

Though there are regular Pujas in the temple, considerable number of devotees visit on Monday and Friday of every week throughout the year.

== Garland decorations ==
On these festival days, garland as big as the height of the Horse Idol wore to it by Devotees who had it as a promise upon realising their prayers. These garland are not made by natural flowers since it takes up to a week for a person to thread a one. The agents who specialised in making this huge garlands start advertising and accepting the orders two/three months before the festival itself.

This is a custom found nowhere else in the world. Every year there would be minimum more than 1000 garland, hence leaving only the Horse nose visible. Separate iron rods are built to hang the garland, thus by protecting the idol not damaged by the heavy weight.

== Renovation 2010 ==
A view of Devotees on 22, May 2010

The Temple is recently renovated by contributions from devotees and it was initiated by the former Alangudi MLA Mr. A. Venkatachalam along with support of the village people. A new Temple Mandapam is constructed to add to the beauty of ancient Kuthirai (The Horse) which also got re-painted as part this. After the renovation, the Maha Kumbhabhishekam happened on 22, May 2010.
