= Buddha Park of Ravangla =

Park in Sikkim, India

Coordinates: 27.3136°N 88.3636°E

Buddha Park
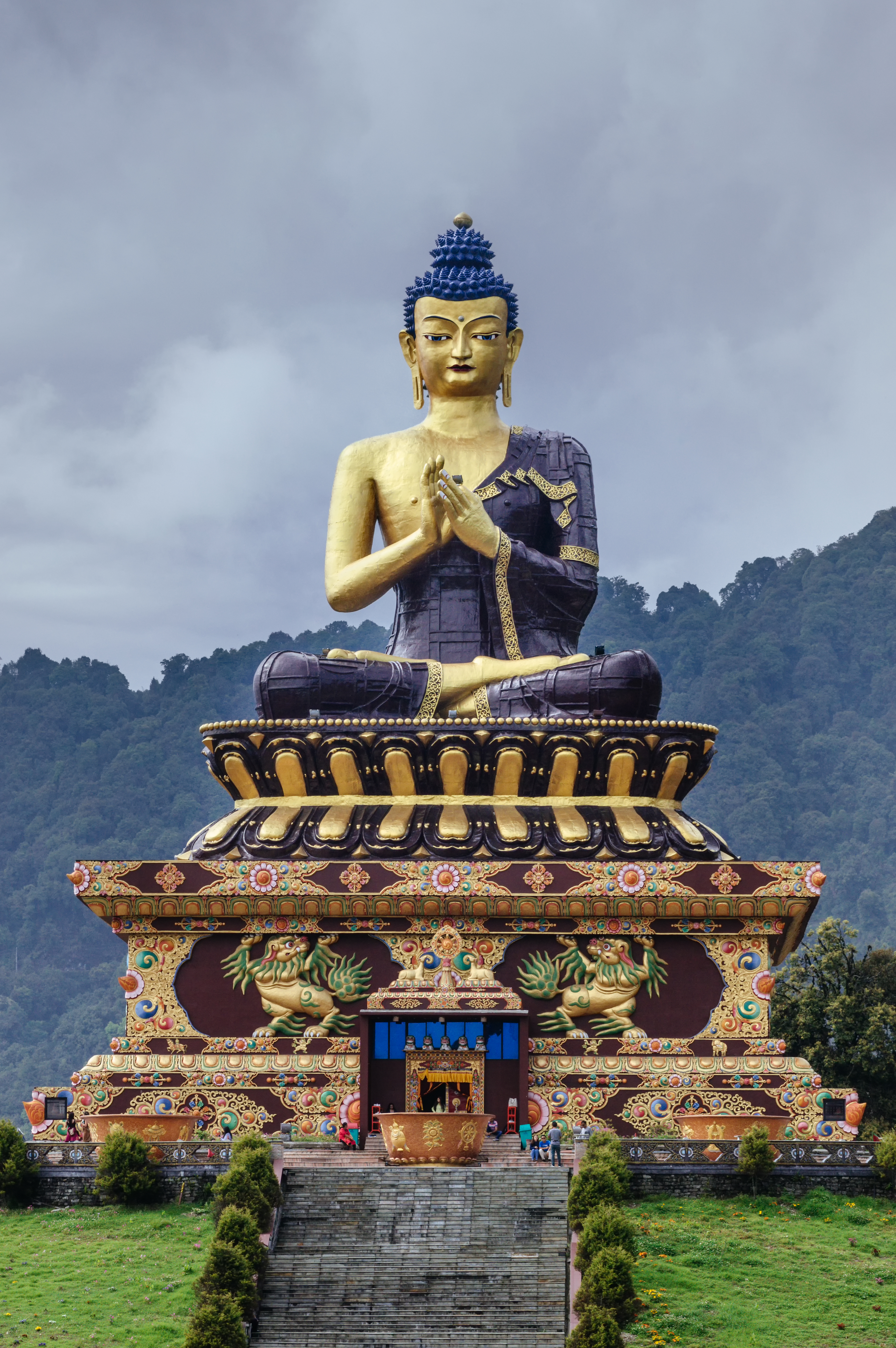
- Interactive map of Buddha Park
- Location: Ravangla, Sikkim, India
- Created: 2013

The Buddha Park of Ravangla, also known as Tathagata Tsal, is situated near Ravangla in South Sikkim district of the Indian state of Sikkim. It was constructed between 2006 and 2013, and features a 130-foot-high (40 m) statue of the Buddha, erected to mark the 2550th anniversary of the birth of Gautama Buddha, as its main attraction. The statue, built of 60 tonnes of copper, is an example of repoussage. Mount Narsing forms the backdrop to the statue. The site was chosen within the larger religious complex of Rabong Monastery, itself a centuries-old place of pilgrimage. Also nearby is Ralang Monastery, a key monastery in Tibetan Buddhism. Built and installed through the joint efforts of the government and people of Sikkim, the statue was consecrated on 25 March 2013 by the 14th Dalai Lama. The Buddhist circuit of the park was built under a state government project, intended to boost pilgrimage and tourism to the region. The Cho Djo lake is located within the complex, surrounded by forest. The park has a tranquil setting with spacious pathways, and there is a Buddhist conclave, a meditation centre and a museum with a spiral gallery.

== Access ==
The Buddha Park is located approximately 1 kilometre (0.62 mi) north of the city of Ravangla, in the South Sikkim district of India's Sikkim state. The city of Ravangla is connected by road, rail and air. It is located 126 km (78 mi) from Bagdogra Airport, 122 km (76 mi) from Jalpaiguri, 118 km (73 mi) from Siliguri, and 85 km (53 mi) from Gangtok. Nationalized Transport SNT buses run from the headquarters of South Sikkim district. Apart from this, taxis are also available on private or shared fare, and the park is within walking distance of the bus stand in Ravangla.

== Gallery ==
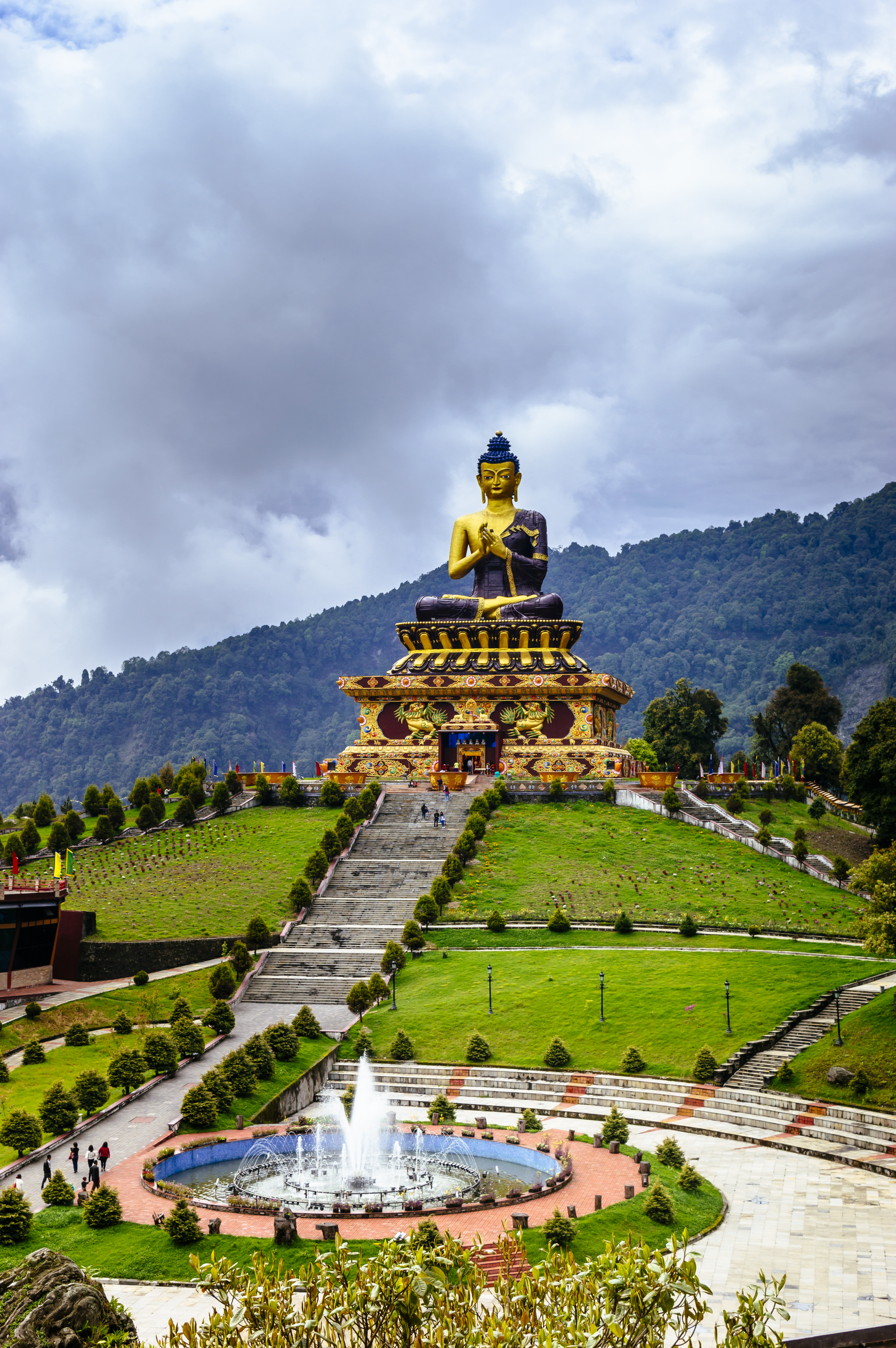
Buddha statue

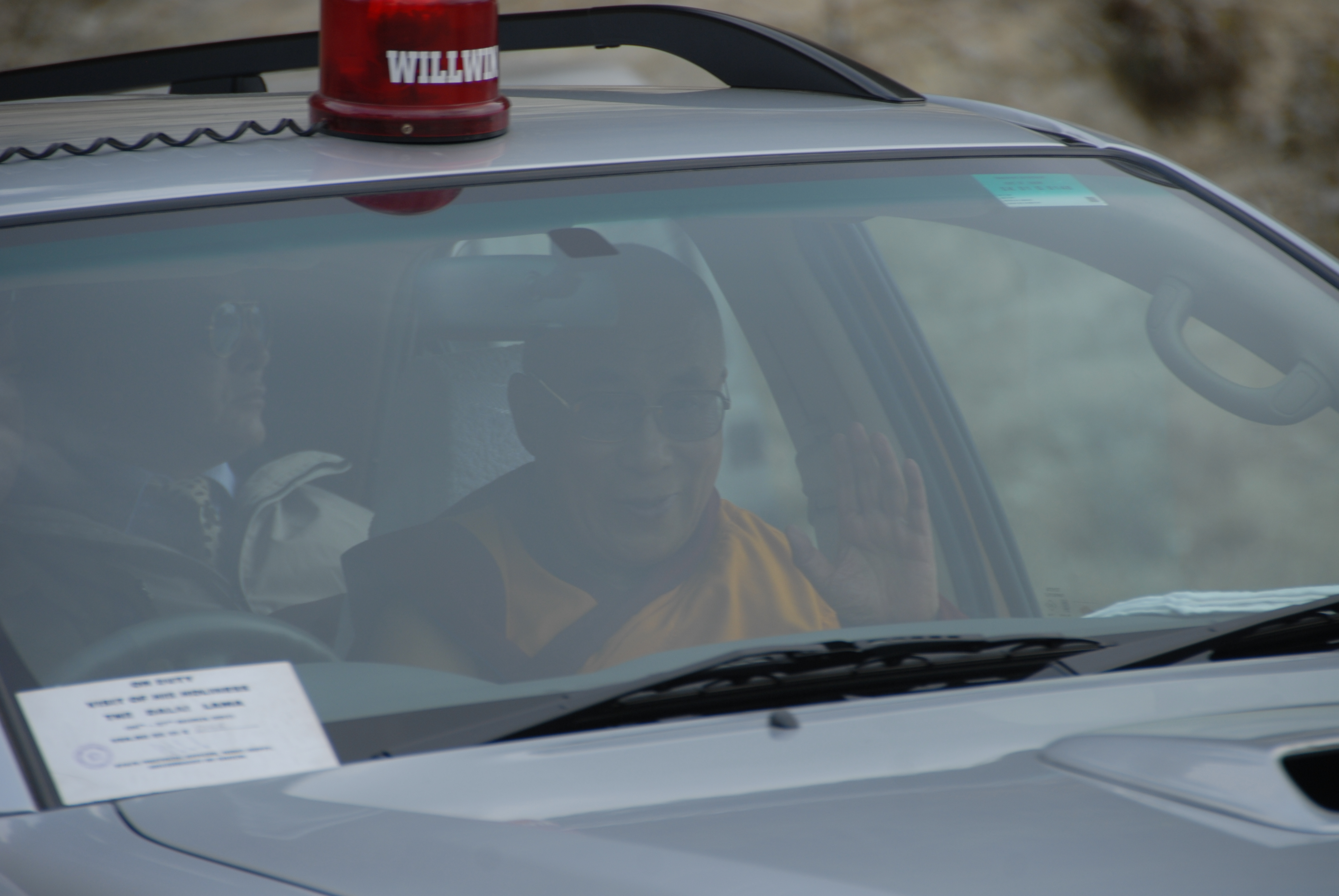
The Dalai Lama entering the Buddha Park

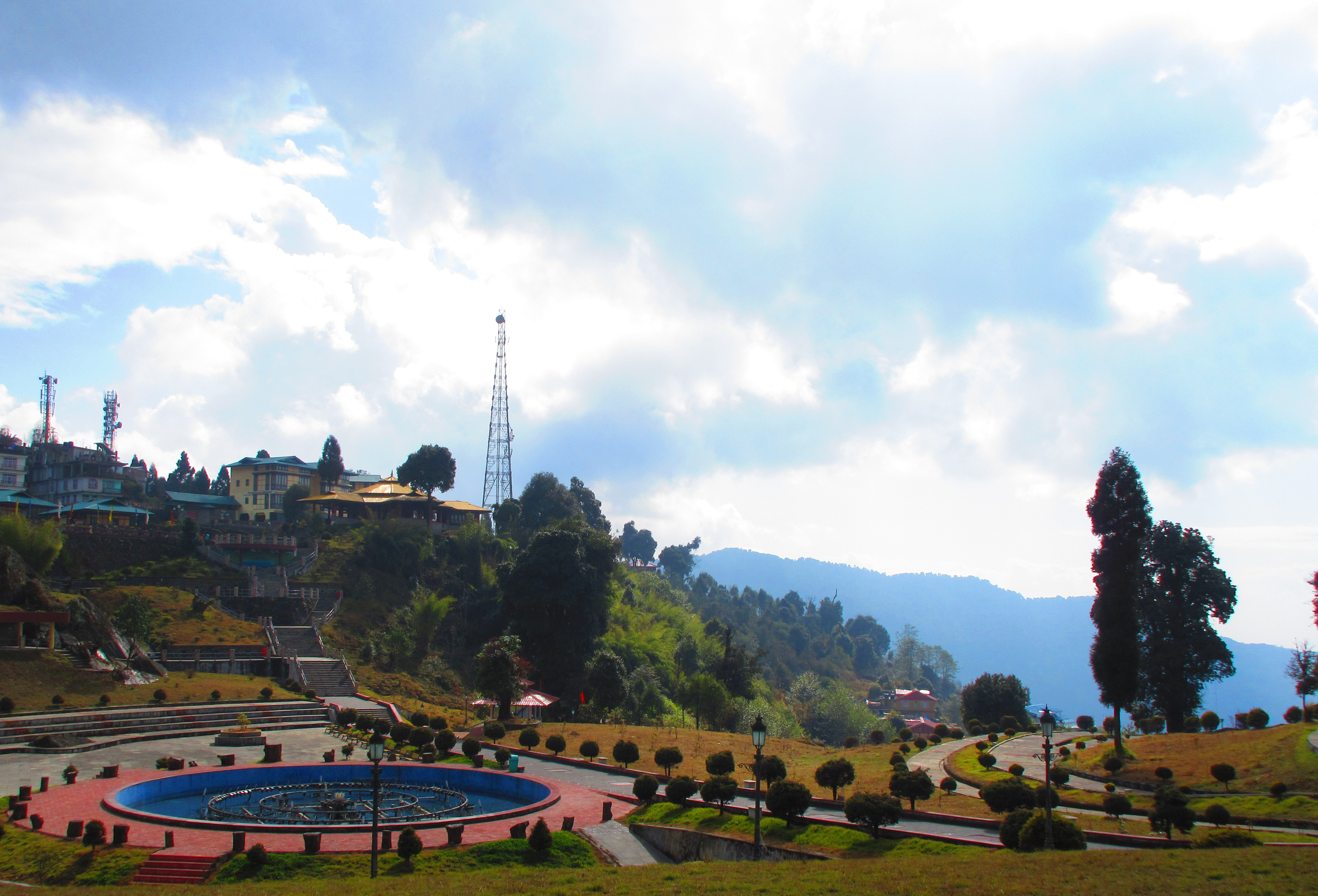
View of the Buddha Park

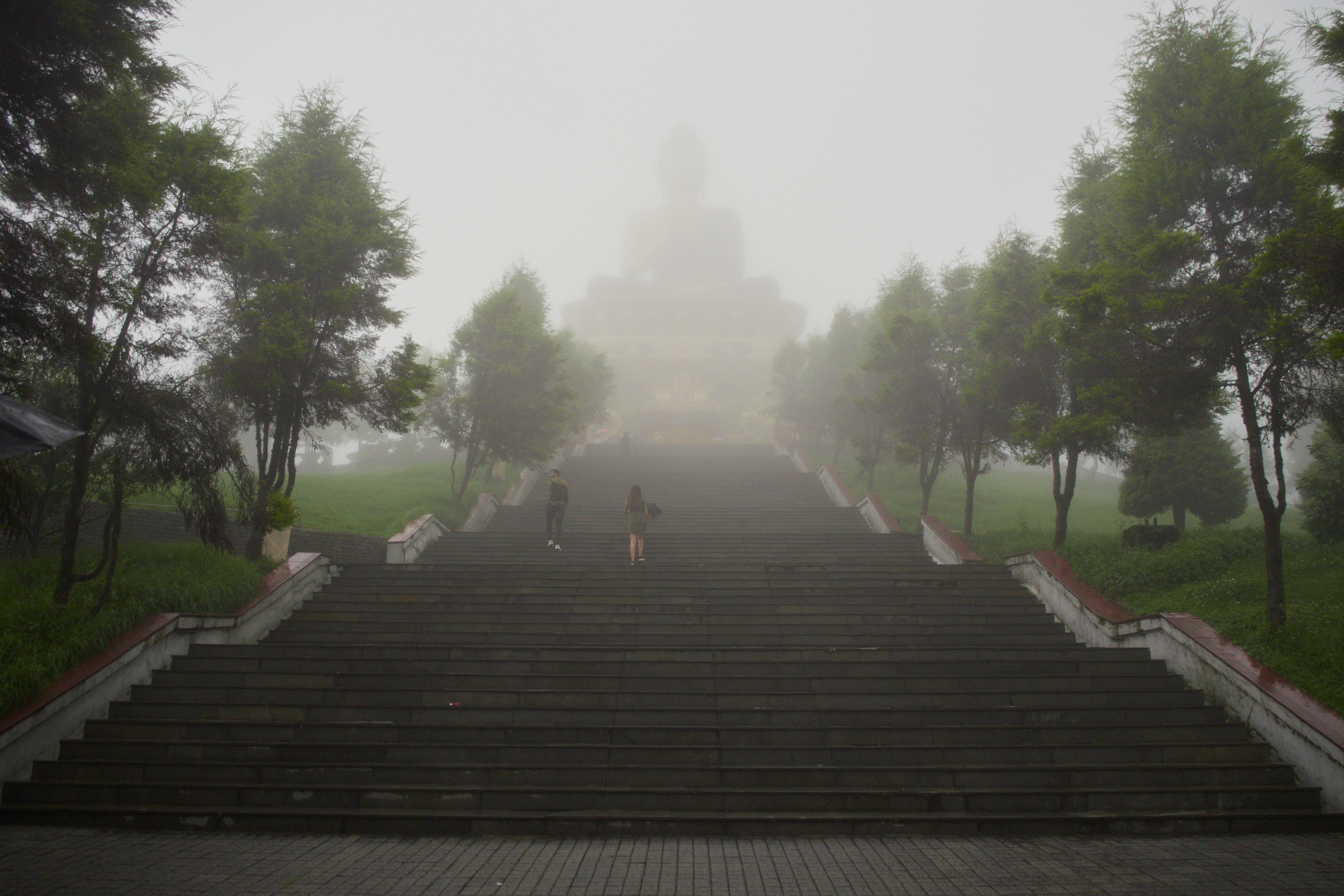
Staircase up to Buddha statue on a foggy day

== Translation ==
Tathagata Tsal translates to the following:

- Tathagata is just one of the titles of a buddha, but was the one most frequently employed by Siddhartha Gautama, and the generally adopted interpretation is "one who has thus (tatha) arrived (agata)" or "one who has thus (tatha) gone (gata)".
- Tsal is difficult to translate and refers to the potential of the awareness to manifest and the manifestation itself.
