= U. Kothapalli =

- Village
- Interactive map of U. Kothapalli
- Location in Andhra Pradesh, India U. Kothapalli (India)
- Coordinates: 17.087419°N 82.317369°E
- Country: India
- State: Andhra Pradesh
- District: Kakinada

Languages
  - Official: Telugu
- Time zone: UTC+5:30 (IST)
- Vehicle Registration: AP05 (Former); AP39 (from 30 January 2019)

U. Kothapalli is a village and capital of U. Kothapalli mandal in Kakinada district in the state of Andhra Pradesh in India.
