= Nemam =

Nemam నేమాం
- village
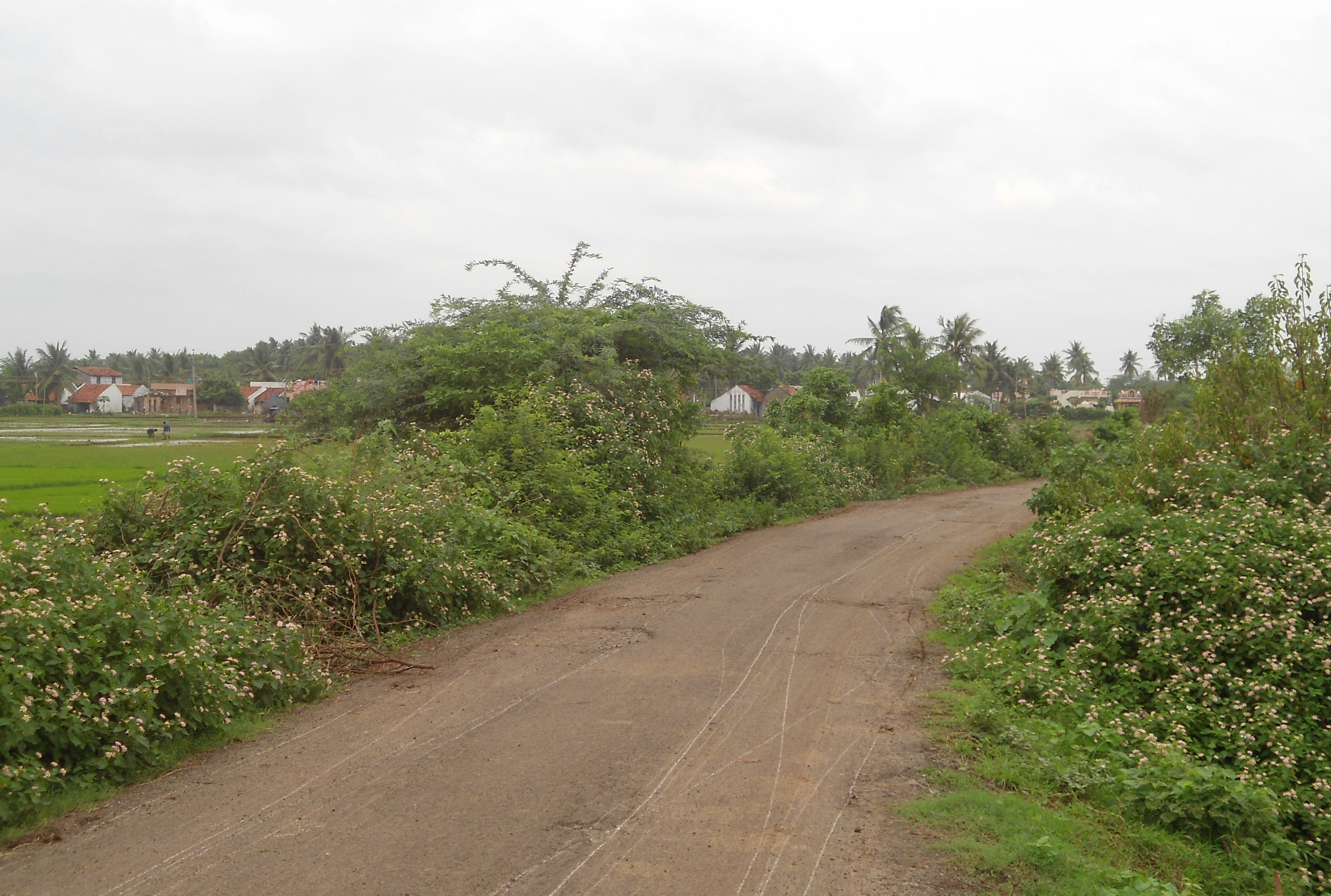
- Road to Nemam
- Interactive map of Nemam
- Location in Andhra Pradesh, India Nemam (India)
- Coordinates: 17.045584°N 82.29489°E
- Country: India
- State: Andhra Pradesh

Languages
  - Official: Telugu
- Time zone: UTC+5:30 (IST)
- PIN: 533005
- Vehicle registration: AP
- Nearest city: Kakinada

Nemam (Telugu: నేమాము; నేమాం) is a village, in the Kakinada district in Kakinada, in the state of Andhra Pradesh in India. It means appointment (నియామకం) in the Telugu language.
