= Chevitikallu =

- Village
- Interactive map of Chevitikallu
- Location in Andhra Pradesh, India Chevitikallu (India)
- Coordinates: 16.617534°N 80.3596009°E
- Country: India
- State: Andhra Pradesh
- District: NTR

Population (2011)
  - Total: 2,588

Languages
  - Official: Telugu
- Time zone: UTC+5:30 (IST)
- PIN: 521180
- Vehicle registration: AP
- Lok Sabha constituency: Vijayawada
- Vidhan Sabha constituency: Nandigama

Chevitikallu is a village in Kanckikacherla mandal located in NTR district of the Indian state of Andhra Pradesh.
