= Gaur Yamuna City =

- City
- Nickname: Gr. GYC
- Yamuna Expressway, Uttar Pradesh, India
- Coordinates: 28°18′34.7″N 77°33′27″E
- Country: India
- State: Uttar Pradesh
- District: Gautam Buddha Nagar

Area
  - Total: 1.0117 km^{2} (0.3906 sq mi)

Languages
  - Official: Hindi
- Time zone: UTC+5:30 (IST)
- Postal code: 201301

Gaur Yamuna City is a group housing residential city located near Yamuna Expressway. Spread over 101 hectares (250 acres), Gaur Yamuna City is being developed by Gaursons India, through the construction of plots, villas, and apartments. The township has 20,000 residential apartments as well as hospitals, schools, and commercial complexes.

The land on which Gaur Yamuna City resides was originally part of the Dankaur Village and after its acquisition, the land was allocated to Jaypee Group for the development of Yamuna Expressway. This land acquisition saw protests by farmers in 2011 and the issue was resolved when farmers got additional compensation for their land and 7% of the developed land in lieu of the acquired land. Gaursons India purchased this land from Jaypee Group for ₹1500 crore and will be investing ₹5000 crore in its development over the next 4 years starting in 2014. It is the first integrated township on the Yamuna expressway which will connect to the upcoming Jewar Airport.
