= Paritala Anjaneya Temple =

Hindu temple in Andhra Pradesh, India

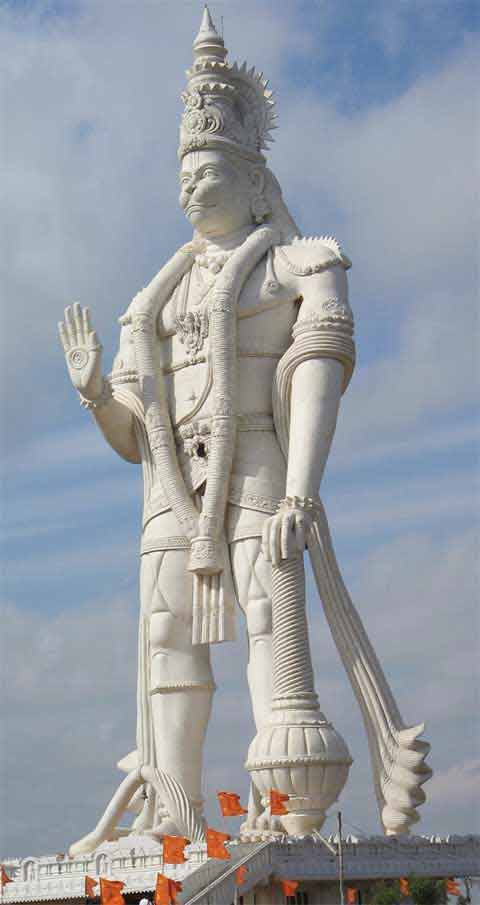
- Lord Hanuman Statue at Paritala Anjaneya Temple
- Interactive map of Paritala Anjaneya Temple
- Location: Vijayawada, Andhra Pradesh, India
- Coordinates: 16.64688°N 80.423339°E
- Type: Statue
- Material: Concrete
- Height: 135 feet (41 m)
- Opening date: 22 June 2003

Paritala Anjaneya Temple is a temple residing a statue of Bhagavan Hanuman. The status of this statue being the second tallest one dedicated to Bhagavan Hanuman in the world has been replaced by another statue located at Manav Bharti University, Solan, with a height of 155 feet (47 metres). The current record is held by the statue in Madapam, Srikakulam district on the banks of the river Vamsadhara in North Andhra (171 feet (52 metres)). It has also been awarded by the Limca Book of Records. The temple is located in the village of Paritala on NH-65, approximately 30 km from the city of Vijayawada, in the Indian state of Andhra Pradesh. The statue was installed in the year 2003 and stands 135 feet (41 metres) tall.

The tallest Lord Hanuman statue outside India is at Carapichaima, Trinidad and Tobago, which is 85 feet (26 metres) tall.

== See also ==
- List of statues
- List of tallest statues
