= Vahelna =

Village in Uttar Pradesh, India

Vahelna is a small village in Muzaffarnagar district of Uttar Pradesh, India.

== Vahelna Jain Temple ==
Shri 1008 Parshvnath Digamber Jain Atishye Kshetra popularly known as Vahelna Jain Mandir is a major historical & religious place for Jains.
