= Kulamangalam =

Neighbourhood in Madurai district, Tamil Nadu, India

- Village
- Location in Tamil Nadu
- Coordinates: 10°00′46″N 78°06′45″E
- Country: India
- State: Tamil Nadu
- District: Madurai
- Taluk: Madurai
- Elevation: 190 m (620 ft)

Population
  - Total: 7,000

Languages
  - Official: Tamil
- Time zone: UTC+5:30 (IST)

Kulamangalam is a village in the Madurai-North taluk of Madurai district, Tamil Nadu, India.

== Demographics ==
According to Census 2011 information the location code or village code of Kulamangalam village is 625017. Kulamangalam village is located in Madurai North Tehsil of Madurai district in Tamil Nadu, India. It is situated 15km away from sub-district headquarter Madurai North and 15km away from district headquarter Madurai. As per 2009 stats, Kulamangulam is the gram panchayat of Kulamangalam village.
