= Hanuman Junction =

Hanuman Junction Bapulapadu
- Town
- Location in Andhra Pradesh, India Hanuman Junction (Andhra Pradesh)
- Coordinates: 16.63°N 80.97°E
- Country: India
- State: Andhra Pradesh
- District: Krishna
- Mandal: Bapulapadu

Government
  - Type: Panchayiti
  - Body: Bapulapadu Panchayiti

Languages
  - Official: Telugu
- Time zone: UTC+5:30 (IST)
- PIN: 521105
- Telephone code: +91-8656
- Vehicle registration: AP 16

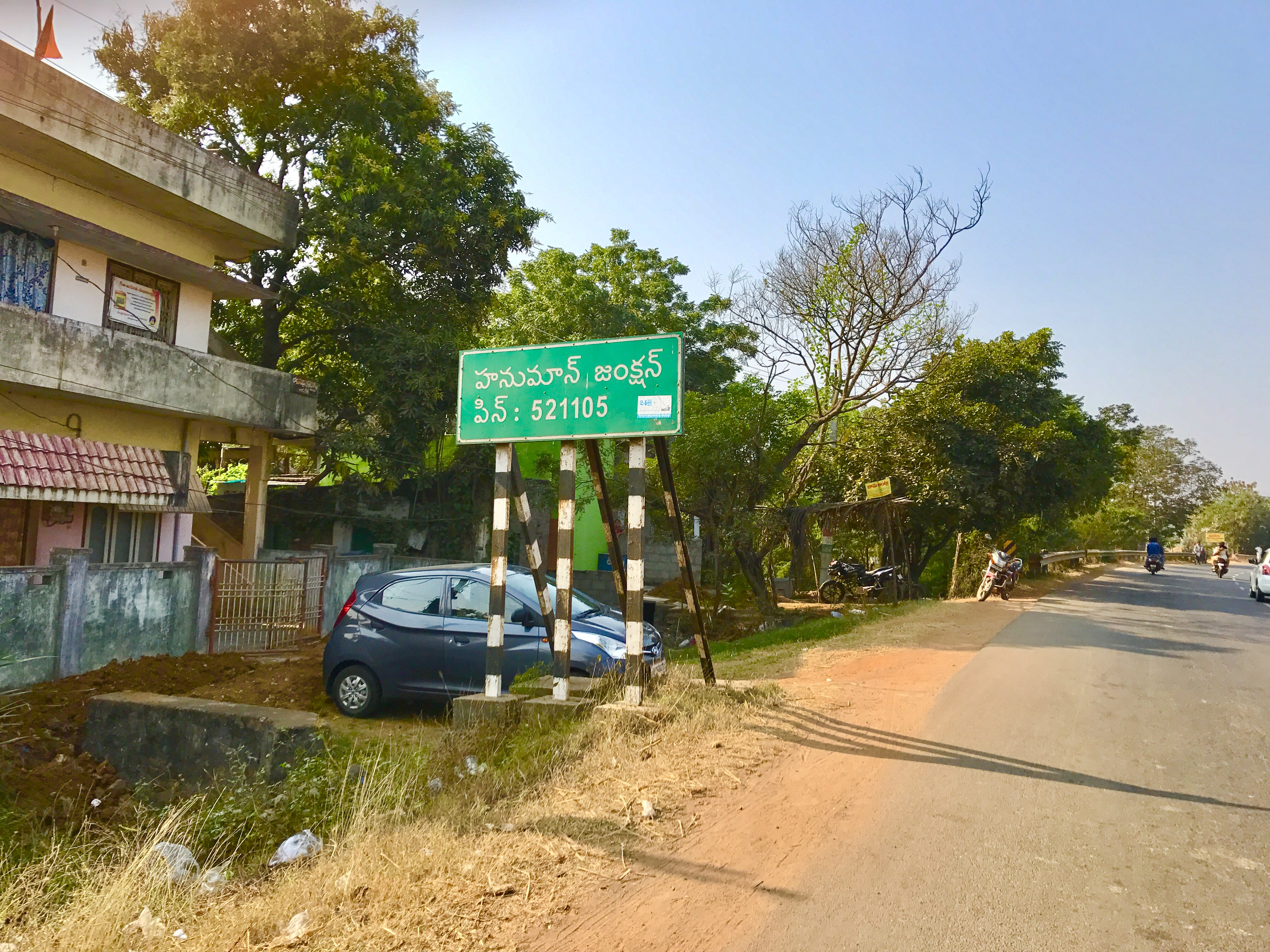
Board on NH-5 in Hanuman Junction

Hanuman Junction is a town which lies between the borders of Krishna and Eluru District of Andhra Pradesh state in India. Hanuman Junction gets its name from the X-Junction of NH-16 & AH-45.

As a part of Bapulapadu Mandal, Gannavaram is the Assembly Constituency and Machilipatnam is the Lok Sabha Constituency.

== History ==
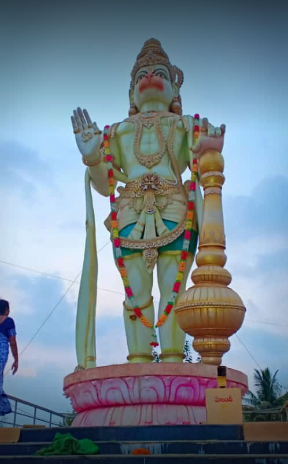
45 Feet Tall Statue

Legends claim that the town was once ruled by Shri M.R. Apparao, a nomadic Zamindar. His father, Sri Meka Venkatadri Bahadur, came to the junction of Bahadur Hanuman with a tremendous appetite in the year 1938. The area was filled with shrubs, thorns and bushes. Suddenly, a monkey came, put a banana in Zamindar's hand and disappeared. Believing that the god Sri Anjaneya Swamy revealed himself as a monkey and handed him a banana, a statue of Sri Anjaneya Swamy in a state of devotion was chosen to be erected there. It was built later that year.

The idol was erected to protect religious devotees from the clutches of evil spirits and set up the Hanuman Junction, a four-lane junction.

== Sites of religious worship ==
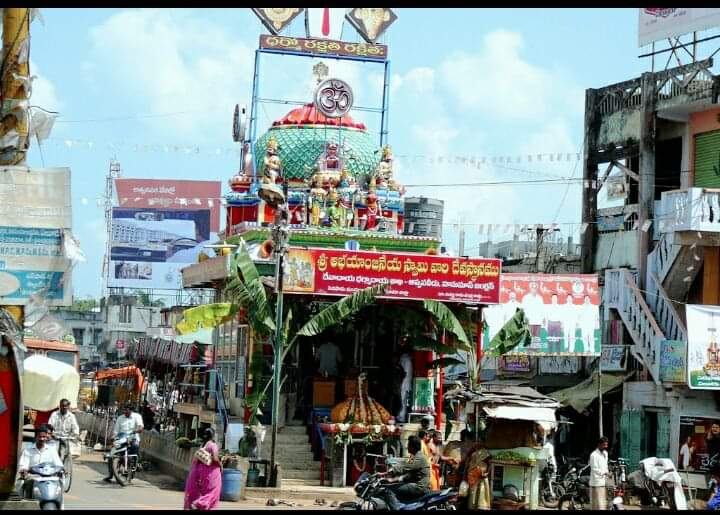
Sri Abhayanjaneya Swami temple.

=== Sri Abhaya Anjaneya Swamy Temple ===
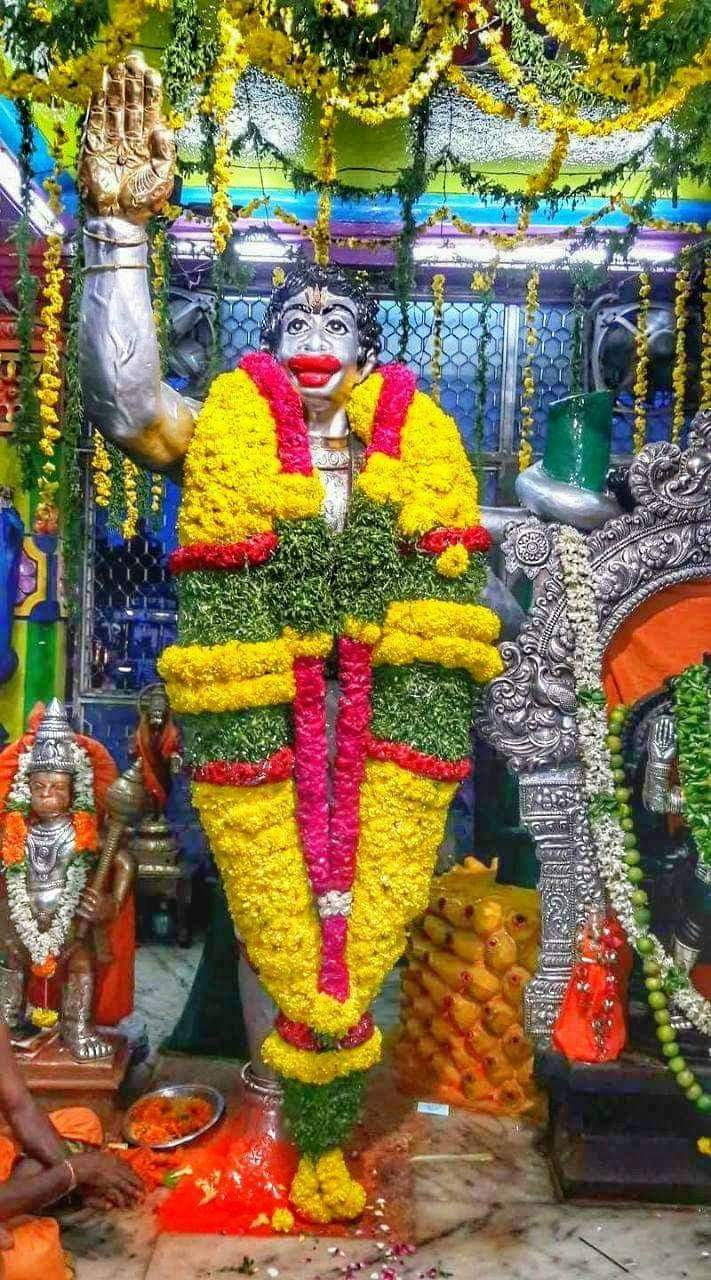
The Hanuman Idol

The statue of Swami was erected in 1938 on the border of Krishna district and West Godavari districts. The feet of the idol are on the border between the districts of West Godavari and Krishna. The Sanctuary is in the West Godavari district but the stairs are in the Krishna district. The face of the statue of Anjaneya Swamy has more human features than a monkey's. It draws crowds from the neighboring cities of Hyderabad, Vizag, Gudivada, Vijayawada, Tirupathi, Srisailam, Karimnagar, Nellore, Warangal, Basara, and Kadapa.

=== Sitha Rama Dasanjaneya Swami Temple ===
Late Sri Palnati Satyanarayana Garu established the Sita Rama Dasanjaneya swami temple in Epuru, Hanuman Junction. Adjacent to that temple there exists a Hanuman statue, 45 feet tall, which was erected in the year 2015. It is the tallest statue of Hanuman in Hanuman Junction. It is located in the village of Epuru, approximately 1.5&nbs km from Hanuman Junction. Epuru Dasanjaneeya Swamy Temple is a statue depicting Abhaya Anjaneeya Swamy. This statue was inaugurated on 23 February 2015 which stands 45 feet tall.

== Public transport ==
Hanuman Junction lies on the Eluru – Vijayawada section of AH-45. APSRTC runs bus services from Eluru, Vijayawada, and Rajahmundry. Regular bus facility from Eluru, Vijayawada, Gudivada, Machilipatnam and Nuzvid.

The Nuzvid railway station is just 2 kilometers away from the town.

Frequently running auto rickshaws, taxis and buses are available.

City bus route numbers between Hanuman Junction and Vijayawada are 252S, 252B, 252.

== Education ==
Primary and secondary school education is provided by the government, aided by private schools, under the School Education Department of the state. The languages used in instruction by different schools are English and Telugu.

== Healthcare ==
Seetha Maha Lakshmi Nursing Home - maintained by DR.Dutta Rama Chandra Rao Garu provide medicine and treatment. It has been recently developed and reconstruction work has been done during early months of 2019.

Dhana Lakshmi Nursing Home in Gudivada Road are also located in Hanuman Junction. Dr.kasi viswanath kedarasetty pediatrician newly started clinic near Bus stand in gogineni bhaskarao garu hospital.

However, the town is far from any well-equipped hospitals for major operations.

== Business ==
Hanuman Junction is a business center for the local villages, and has experienced rapid growth throughout the past years.

There are restaurants, street food and sweet shops. Clothing shops, grocery stores, beauty parlors, saloons and more are upcoming.

There are 2 movie theaters: Sri Krishna, which is located beside the bus stop, and KS Talkies, which is located near Seetha Maha Lakshmi Nursing Home hospital.

== See also ==
- List of tallest statues
