= Shivagiri =

Shivagiri Shivagiri
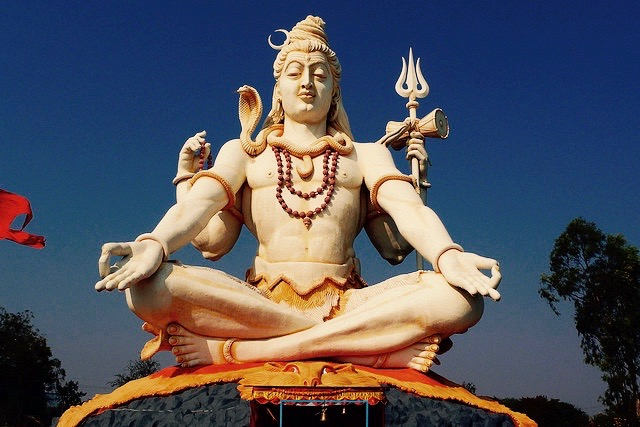
- World's fourth tallest statue of Shiva

- Location in Karnataka, India
- Coordinates: 16.80°N 75.72°E
- Country: India
- State: Karnataka
- District: Vijayapura

Languages
  - Official: Kannada
- Time zone: UTC+5:30 (IST)
- Telephone code: 08382
- Vehicle registration: KA-28

Shivagiri is a temple that houses an 85-foot-tall (26 m) statue of Shiva that has been built by the T.K. Patil Banakatti Charitable Trust in the city of Bijapur, Karnataka, India, on the Sindagi Road. It is slowly becoming a pilgrimage location and one of the highest visited tourist locations in Bijapur. On Maha Shivaratri, every year, it is estimated that the temple is visited by over 150,000 devotees. The temple was built by Mr Basantkumar Patil, in memory of his father, in his hometown of Bijapur.

The 1,500 tonnes statue of Shiva is considered as the second largest resting statue of Shiva in India and was prepared by sculptors from Shimoga for over 13 months. The civilian design was supplied by Bangalore-situated architects. The idol of Shiva is made of cement and steel. A small Shiva Linga has been placed beneath the statue. Also, the "Shiva Charite" will be engraved on the inside walls of the Temple in the Kannada language to help devotees learn the mythological stories related to Shiva. The Trust wants to make it a major pilgrimage centre.

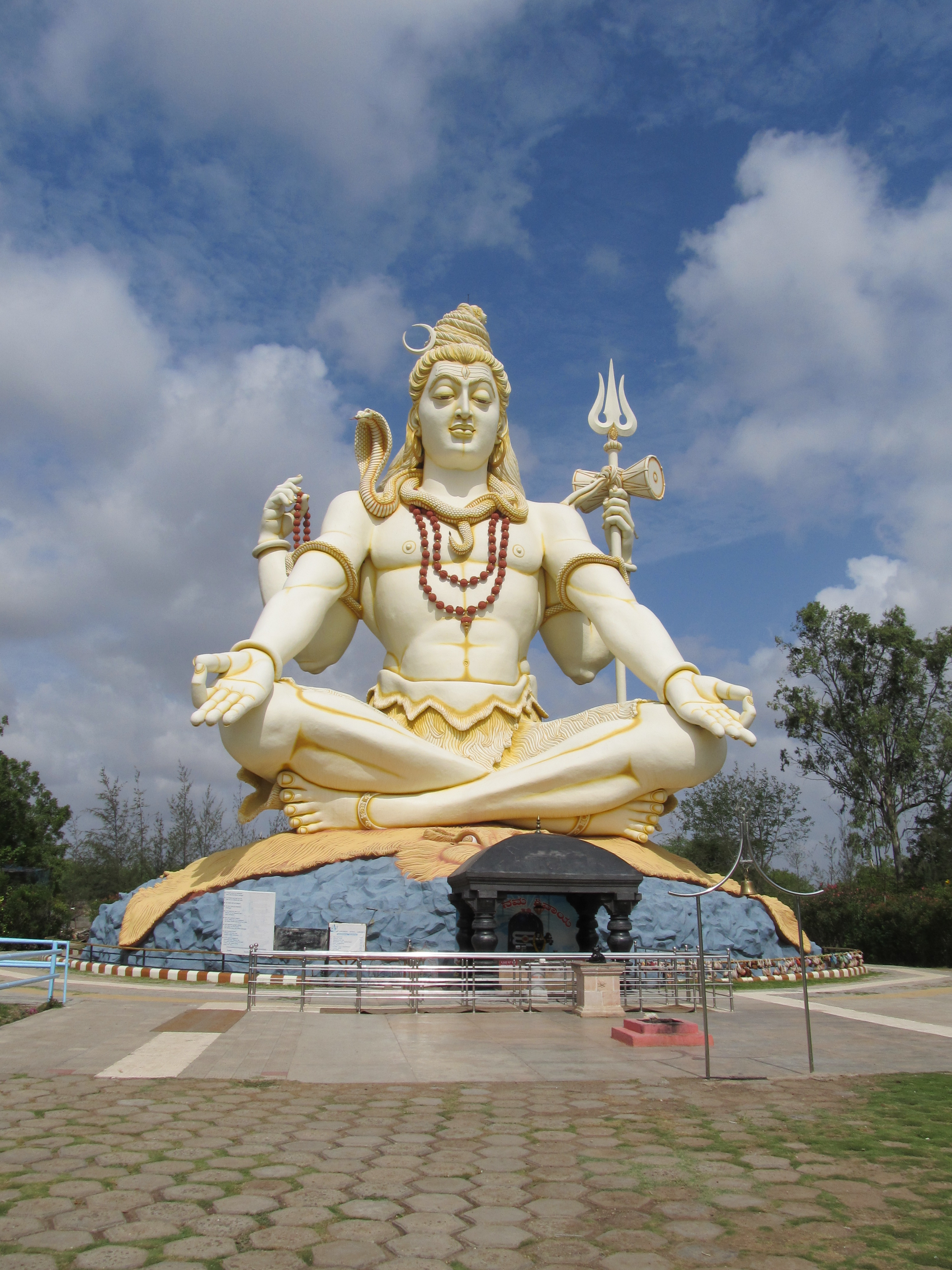
Shiva statue with temple below

Public interest has been anticipated by the Trust with the series of charity work relating to the statue. An old age home is proposed on the 18-acre (7.3 ha) sprawling premises named Basant Vana. One of the five brothers who make up the Trustees, told The Hindu newspaper that initially it will accommodate 52 members and the capacity will be enhanced gradually. Women would be given preference in admission. Once this is stabilised, the Trust will establish a free boarding school for meritorious students from economically and socially deprived classes.

Mr. BASANTKUMAR Patil plans to weigh their mother Tulasibayi with gold on 26 February. As she weighs 55 kilograms (121 lb), the gold is estimated to be Rs. 4.5 crores and this money will be deposited in a bank and interest from it will be used for the associated charity work.
