= Repuru =

- Village
- Interactive map of Repuru
- Location in Andhra Pradesh, India Repuru (India)
- Coordinates: 16.953633°N 82.191786°E
- Country: India
- State: Andhra Pradesh
- Region: Kakinada
- District: Kakinada district
- Mandal: kakinada rural

Languages
  - Official: Telugu
- Time zone: UTC+5:30 (IST)
- PIN: 533006

Repuru is a village in Pedapudi mandal in Kakinada district, Andhra Pradesh state, India.
