= List of statues =

This is a list of notable statues worldwide, past and present.

== Afghanistan ==
- Buddhas of Bamiyan (destroyed in 2001)

== Algeria ==
- Ain El Fouara Fountain, Setif
- Constantine statue, Constantine
- Dihya statue, Khenchela
- Oruç Reis statue, Aïn Témouchent
- Shoshenq statue, Tizi Ouzou

== Australia ==
- Dog on the Tuckerbox, five miles (8 km) from Gundagai
- Burke and Wills statue, Melbourne
- South African War Memorial, Adelaide
- Map the Miner, Kapunda, South Australia
- Big Merino

== Austria ==
- Statues in facades of the Kunsthistorisches Museum - the Art History Museum and Naturhistorisches Museum - Museum of Natural History of Vienna, Maria-Theresien-Platz, Vienna.
- Maria Theresa Memorial, Maria-Theresien-Platz, Vienna, between the Kunsthistorisches Museum and the Naturhistorisches Museum. Sculpted by Kaspar von Zumbusch and unveiled in 1888.
  - Gerard van Swieten statue on the memorial to Maria Theresa.
  - Field marshal von Laudon, Field marshal von Daun, Field marshal von Traun, and Field marshal von Khevenhüller on the memorial to Maria Theresa.
- Archduke Karl by Anton Dominik Fernkorn at the Heldenplatz, 1859. The equestrian sculpture is insofar a miracle which stands for Fernkorn's craftsmanship as a sculptor, as only the two back legs of the horse have a connection with the pedestal, it is only the second oldest in the world of this kind, after the Monument to Nicholas I in Saint Petersburg, outdoing the achievement of Tacca's equestrian sculpture of Philip IV in Madrid.
- Prince Eugen by Anton Dominik Fernkorn at the Heldenplatz, 1865.
- Archduke Albrecht by Kaspar von Zumbusch in front of the Albertina, 1899.
- General Radetzky by Kaspar von Zumbusch in the Ringstraße, 1891.
- Statue of Nicholas, Count of Salm, plaza of the Rathaus, Vienna.
- Statues of Schönbrunn Palace, Gloriette Garden, Vienna.

== Belgium ==
- Ambiorix, in Tongres
- Manneken Pis, in Brussels
- Butte du Lion ("Hillock of the Lion", "Lion's Mound"), in Waterloo
- Godfrey of Bouillon, Place Royale/Koningsplein, in Brussels
- Baldwin I of Constantinople, in Mons
- Leopold II, in Brussels
- Albert I, Mont des Arts/Kunstberg, in Brussels
- Charlemagne, in Liège

== Bolivia ==
- Cristo de la Concordia in Cochabamba

== Brazil ==
- Christ the Redeemer

== Cambodia ==
- Norodom Sihanouk Memorial
- Preah Thong Neang Neak Statue

== Canada ==
=== Manitoba ===
- Louis-Riel by Miguel Joyal

=== Newfoundland and Labrador ===
- The Dead Christ
- The Veiled Virgin

=== Ontario ===
- Timothy Eaton statue – Royal Ontario Museum
- Henry Moore sculptures in front of Toronto City Hall and Art Gallery of Ontario
- Statue of Winston Churchill near Nathan Phillips Square, Toronto
- Statue of Sir Adam Beck on University Avenue in Toronto
- Queen's Park, Toronto
  - George Brown, one of the Fathers of Confederation
  - King George V moved from Delhi, India in 1969
  - Sir John A. Macdonald, first Prime Minister of Canada
  - William Lyon Mackenzie, leader of the Upper Canada Rebellion
  - Sir Oliver Mowat, third Premier of Ontario
  - John Graves Simcoe, first Lieutenant-Governor of Ontario
  - Queen Victoria
  - Sir James Pliny Whitney, sixth Premier of Ontario
  - Ontario Veterans Memorial
  - Queen Elizabeth II Rose Gardens in honour of Her Majesty's Silver Jubilee in 1977 and Golden Jubilee in 2002
- Parliament Hill, Ottawa
  - Queen Victoria – located north of the West Block; sculpted by Louis-Philippe Hébert (1900)
  - Alexander Mackenzie – located west of the Centre Block; sculpted by Louis-Philippe Hébert (1901)
  - Henry Albert Harper / Galahad – located outside the Queen's Gates, facing Centre Block; sculpted by Ernest Wise Keyser (1905)
  - George Brown – located west of the Centre Block; sculpted by George William Hill (1913)
  - Robert Baldwin and Sir Louis-Hippolyte Lafontaine – located east of the Centre Block; sculpted by Walter Seymour Allward (1914)
  - Sir Wilfrid Laurier – located south of the East Block; sculpted by Joseph-Émile Brunet (1922)
  - Sir Robert Laird Borden – located west of the West Block; sculpted by Frances Loring (1957)
  - Queen Elizabeth II – located east of the Centre Block; sculpted by Jack Harman (1977)
  - John Diefenbaker – located north of the West Block; sculpted by Leo Mol (1985)
  - Lester Bowles Pearson – located north of the West Block; sculpted by Danek Mozdzenski (1989)
  - Sir George-Étienne Cartier – located west of the Centre Block; sculpted by Louis-Philippe Hébert
  - The Famous Five – depicts the women's suffrage movement (Nellie McClung, Irene Parlby, Emily Murphy, Louise McKinney and Henrietta Muir Edwards); sculpted by Barbara Paterson; the monument is featured on the reverse of the current $50 banknote by various sculptors
  - Sir John A. Macdonald – located east of the Centre Block; sculpted by Louis-Philippe Hébert
  - William Lyon Mackenzie King – located north of the East Block; sculpted by Raoul Hunter
  - Thomas D'Arcy McGee – located north of the Centre Block; sculpted by George William Hill

=== Saskatchewan ===
- Sir John A. Macdonald statue

== Croatia ==
=== Zagreb ===
- Well of Life in Lower Town
- Tomb of the People's Heroes in Upper Town
- Bacač diska in Maksimir
- Spomenik Moši Pijadi in Lower Town
- Ban Jelačić Statue in Ban Jelačić Square
- Dora Krupić statue in Stone Gate
- Spomenik don Frane Bulić in Lower Town
- Spomenik fra Andrija Kačić Miošić in Lower Town
- Spomenik Eugen Kumičić in Lower Town
- Skulptura Mali dječak in Lower Town
- Saint George Killing a Dragon by Anton Dominik Fernkorn in Lower Town
- Spomenik Kralju Tomislavu by Robert Frangeš-Mihanović in Lower Town
- Spomenik Petar Preradović in Lower Town
- Fontana sa skulpturom Borba in Upper Town
- Spomenik Josip Juraj Strossmayer in Lower Town
- Spomenik Nikola Tesla in Lower Town
- Spomenik Marija Jurić Zagorka in Upper Town
- Spomenik Antun Gustav Matoš in Upper Town

=== Split ===
- Gregory of Nin

== China ==
- Leshan Giant Buddha in Sichuan
- Grand Buddha at Ling Shan in Wuxi, Jiangsu China
- Spring Temple Buddha in Henan
- Terracotta Army in Xi'an
- Young Mao Zedong statue in Changsha, Hunan

== Chile ==
- Moai in Easter Island

== Colombia ==
- Cristo Rey
- India Catalina
- Monument to Effort
- Shakira statue
- Vargas Swamp Lancers

== Denmark ==
- Frederik V on Horseback by Jacques Saly
- The Little Mermaid by Edvard Eriksen
- Christus at Church of Our Lady, Copenhagen by Bertel Thorvaldsen

== Ecuador ==
- The Madonna of El Panecillo, Quito

== Egypt ==
- Great Sphinx of Giza
- Abu Simbel

== France ==
- Vimy Memorial, honouring Canada's role there in the First World War
- The Burghers of Calais by Auguste Rodin in Calais
- The Thinker by Auguste Rodin in Paris
- The Lion of Belfort by Frédéric Bartholdi in Belfort
- Venus de Milo, ancient Greek statue in the Louvre
- Winged Victory of Samothrace, ancient Greek statue also in the Louvre
- Statue of Liberty (Jardin du Luxembourg) by Frédéric Bartholdi on the Île aux Cygnes in Paris
- Jeanne d'Arc in the Rue de Rivoli by Emmanuel Frémiet.
- Jeanne d'Arc in front of the Basilique du Sacré-Cœur by Hippolyte Lefèbvre, 1927.
- King Louis IX in front of the Basilique du Sacré-Cœur by Hippolyte Lefèbvre, 1927.
- Ferdinand Foch near the Trocadéro.
- Joseph Joffre in front of École Militaire.
- Charlemagne (Charlemagne et ses Leudes) by Charles and Louis Rochet in front of the Cathédrale Notre-Dame de Paris, 1882.
- Albert I of Belgium near the Place de la Concorde.
- King Henri IV by François-Frédéric Lemot on the Pont Neuf.*Étienne Marcel by Antonin Idrac near the Hôtel de Ville.
- Marble equestrian statue of King Louis XIII at Place des Vosges. Begun in 1816 by Louis Dupaty, completed in 1821 by Jean-Pierre Cortot.
- General Lafayette at Cours la Reine by Paul Wayland Bartlett.
- King Louis XIV in front of Louvre Pyramid.
- King Louis XIV by François Joseph Bosio at the Place des Victoires, 1822.
- José de San Martín in the Parc Montsouris.
- King Edward VII by Paul Landowski at Place Edouard VII.
- Napoléon Bonaparte at Champs-Élysées.
- Simón Bolívar at Pont Alexandre-III.

== Georgia ==
- Kartlis Deda by Elguja Amashukeli

== Germany ==
- Bavaria, a statue as symbol of the South German kingdom of Bavaria in Munich
- Victory Column, a statue of Victoria, the goddess of victory, in Berlin
- Bismarck Monument, a statue of Otto von Bismarck, in Hamburg
- Hermannsdenkmal, a statue of Arminius, victor of the Battle of the Teutoburg Forest
- Niederwalddenkmal, a statue of Germania, as symbol of Germany, close to Rüdesheim
- King Friedrich II by Christian Daniel Rauch in the Unter den Linden.
- King Friedrich Wilhelm IV by Alexander Calandrelli in front of the Alte Nationalgalerie.
- National Monument (Emperor Wilhelm I Monument) by Reinhold Begas in front of the Berlin City Palace, 1897, destroyed.
- Emperor Wilhelm I by Albert Moritz Wolff at the Hohenzollernplatz in Rixdorf, 1902, destroyed in 1944.
- Emperor Wilhelm I by Franz Dorrenbach in the Neuendorfer Straße in Spandau.
- Emperor Friedrich III by Rudolf Maison, in front of Bode Museum, 1904, destroyed in 1950s.
- Saint George defeats the Dragon
- Statue of Sleeping Beauty in Wuppertal.

== Greece ==
- Statue of Zeus at Olympia, one of the Seven Wonders of the Ancient World sculpted by Pheidias. (Relocated to Constantinople in 393, later destroyed by fire in 462)
- Colossus of Rhodes, one of the Seven Wonders of the Ancient World. (destroyed by earthquake in 224 BC, and the remains sold for scrap in 656)
- Athena Promachos, was a colossal bronze statue of the Greek goddess Athena which stood between the Propylaea and the Parthenon on the Acropolis of Athens, sculpted by Pheidias.
- Athena Parthenos, was a massive chryselephantine sculpture of the Greek goddess Athena which stood inside the Parthenon on the Acropolis of Athens, sculpted by Pheidias.
- Poseidon of Cape Artemision
- Antikythera Ephebe
- Marathon Boy
- Charioteer of Delphi
- Hermes of Praxiteles
- Kroisos Kouros
- Kleobis and Biton
- Moscophoros
- Peplos Kore
- Statue of King Leonidas - Thermopylae
- Statue of Liberty (Mytilene)

== Hong Kong ==
- Statue of Queen Victoria at the entrance of Victoria Park
- Statue of Sir Thomas Jackson at Statue Square
- Statue of King George VI at Hong Kong Zoological and Botanical Gardens
- Statue of Bruce Lee the Hong Kong cities
- Tian Tan Buddha in Buddhist temple in Hong Kong

Lost statues in Hong Kong include:

- Statue of Edward VII – formerly at Statue Square
- Statue of Prince Albert – formerly at Statue Square

== Hungary ==
- Heroes' Square, Heroes' Square (Hősök tere in Hungarian) is one of the major squares of Budapest, Hungary.
- Anonymus, The statue of Anonymus, created by Miklós Ligeti in 1903, sits in front of Vajdahunyad Castle in Budapest's Városliget (City Park).
- Statue Park, Szoborpark or Statue Park is a park in Budapest's XXII. district, with a gathering of monumental Soviet-era statues.
- Liberty Statue, The Szabadság Szobor or Liberty Statue (sometimes Freedom Statue) in Budapest, Hungary, was first erected in 1947 in remembrance of the Soviet liberation of Hungary from Nazi forces during World War II.

== India ==
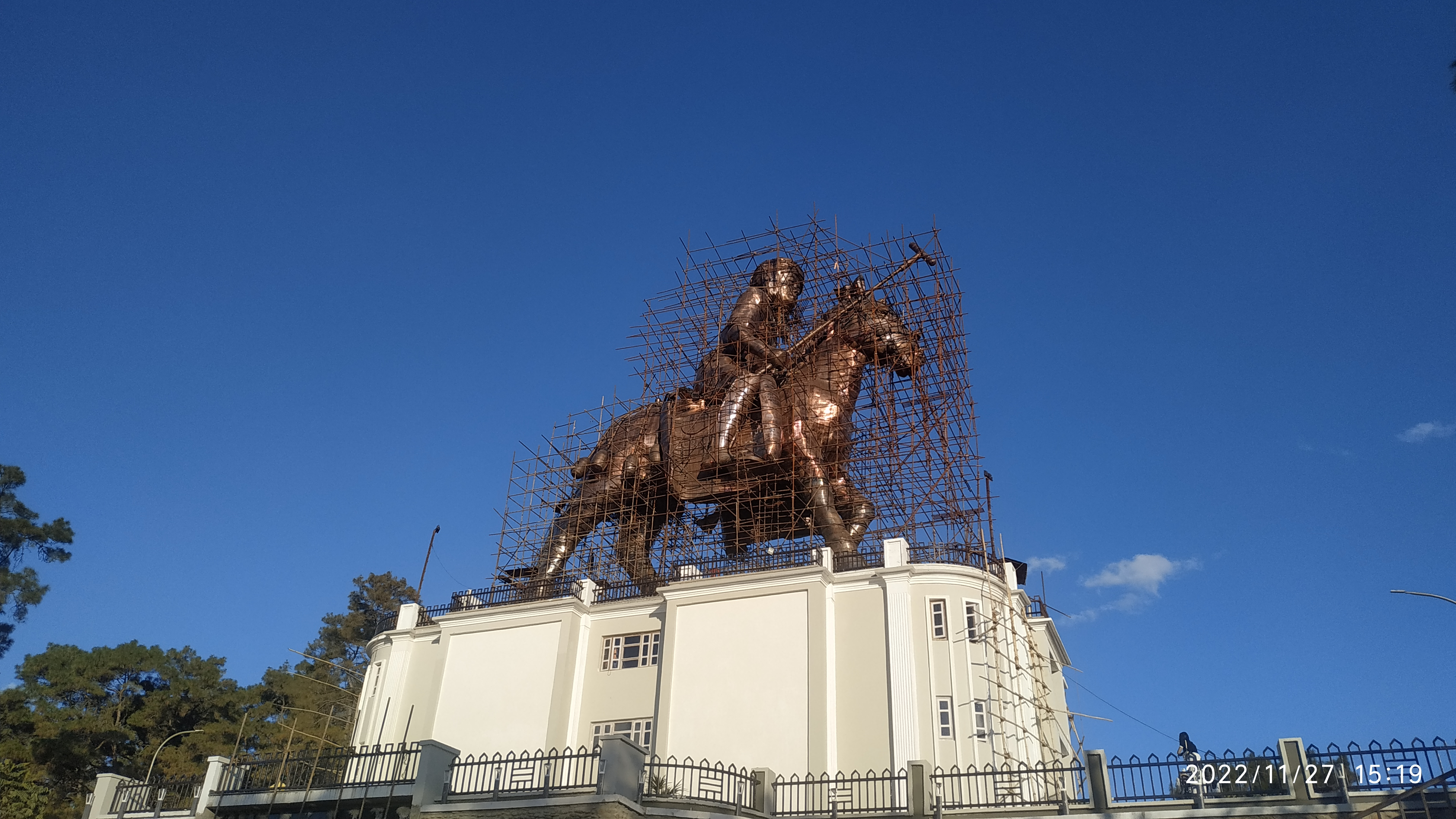
The Marjing Polo Statue in the Marjing Polo Complex of Heingang Ching in Imphal

- Marjing Polo Statue, Imphal East, Manipur (world's tallest equestrian statue of a polo player)
- Thiruvalluvar Statue, Kanyakumari, Tamil Nadu
- Shiva, Murudeshwara
- Gommateshwara statue, Shravanabelagola, Karnataka
- Statue of Lord Male Mahadeshwara.
- Statue of Ahimsa, Maharashtra
- Shri Bhaktha Anjaneyar, Vedasandur, Dindigul, Tamil Nadu
- Buddha Statue of Hyderabad, Husain Sagar, Hyderabad, Telangana
- Abhaya Buddha Statue in Eluru, Andhra Pradesh
- Dhyana Buddha Statue in Amaravathi
- Lord Hanuman statue, Namakkal, Tamil Nadu.
- Statue of Equality (Ramanuja), Hyderabad, Telangana
- Statue of Unity, (world's tallest)
- Adiyogi Shiva statue, Coimbatore, Tamil Nadu
- Statue of Belief, Nathdwara, Rajasthan.
- Jakhoo Temple Hanuman Murti, Shimla, Himachal Pradesh.
- Prabhu Sri Ramachandra bronze statue 77ft., Parthagali Jeevoththama Gokarna mutt, Canacona, South Goa.

== Indonesia ==
- Christ Blessing, Manado
- Garuda Wisnu Kencana statue, Bali
- Jalesveva Jayamahe Monument, Surabaya
- Jesus Buntu Burake, Makale
- Patung Pemuda Membangun, Jakarta
- Patung Yesus Kristus, Mansinam Island
- Selamat Datang Monument, Jakarta
- West Irian Liberation Monument, Jakarta

== Italy ==
- Colossus of Barletta, statue of a Byzantine emperor
- Colossus of Nero
- Apollo Belvedere
- Laocoön and His Sons
- David (Donatello)
- Bacchus (Michelangelo)
- David (Michelangelo)
- The Deposition (Michelangelo)
- Cristo della Minerva
- Moses (Michelangelo)
- Pietà (Michelangelo)
- Rondanini Pietà
- David (Bernini)
- Aeneas, Anchises, and Ascanius
- Ecstasy of St Theresa
- Leonardo's horse, statue of a Horse in Milan based upon a design by Leonardo da Vinci from 500 years before.
- Statue File:ColaDiRienzo.jpg of Cola di Rienzi by Girolamo Masini, erected in 1877 near the Campidoglio in Rome
- the Trevi Fountain statue in Rome

== Japan ==
- Ushiku Daibutsu as Buddhist temple Ushiku Japan
- Sendai Daikannon in Sendai
- Hokkaido Kannon in Hokkaido
- Awaji Kannon in Awaji

== Lebanon ==
- Our Lady of Lebanon, Harissa-Daraoun

== Mexico ==
- El Ángel de la Independencia, Mexico City
- Julio Cesar Chavez Gonzalez, Culiacan
- Guerrero Chimalli Mexican statue

== Malaysia ==
- Batu Caves in Murugan statue Thaipusam

== Myanmar ==
- Laykyun Sekkya near Monywa
- Statue of Gautama Buddha (Myanmar)
- Chaukhtatgyi Buddha Temple
- Ngahtatgyi Buddha Temple
- Shwethalyaung Buddha
- Mahamuni Buddha

== Mongolia ==
- Equestrian statue of Genghis Khan in Mongolia

== Nepal ==
- Kailashnath Mahadev Statue
- Pumdikot Shiva Statue
- Budhanilkantha Temple

== Nicaragua ==
- Alexis Arguello, Managua
- Jesús de la Misericordia, San Juan del Sur

== Norway ==
- Frogner Park including the Vigeland installation, Oslo

== Philippines ==
- Benavides Monument at the University of Santo Tomas in Manila
- Eagle of the North in Agoo, La Union
- Filipina Comfort Women in Manila (dismantled, lost)
- Mother of All Asia – Tower of Peace in Batangas City
- Queen Isabel II Statue in Manila
- Oblation statues of the University of the Philippines
- St. Vincent Ferrer Statue in Bayambang, Pangasinan
- The Victor in Bridgetowne, Pasig

== Puerto Rico ==
- Sixto Escobar in Barceloneta, thought to be the first made for a professional boxer.
- Birth of the New World

== Russia ==
- Mother Motherland Is Calling
- Bronze Horseman and other equestrian monuments to Russian tsars
- Monument to Minin and Pozharsky on Red Square in Moscow
- Worker and Kolkhoz Woman in Moscow
- Peter the Great Statue in Moscow
- List of statues of Lenin
- List of Mother Motherland statues

== Senegal ==
- African Renaissance Monument, 52 m high

== Serbia ==
- Pobednik in Kalemegdan
- St. Sava by the Church of St. Sava
- Emperor Dušan outside Palata pravde
- Prince Mihailo Monument on the Republic Square
- Karađorđe Statue by the Church of St. Sava

== Sri Lanka ==
- Statue of Bhuddha in Kurunegala is 88-foot (27 m) high
- Maligawila Buddha statue in Maligawila, Monaragala District
- Avukana Buddha statue in Kekirawa, Anuradhapura District
- Three Buddha statues at Buduruvagala in Wellawaya, Monaragala District
- Samadhi Statue in Anuradhapura
- Toluvila statue in National Museum of Colombo
- Badulla Preaching Buddha in National Museum of Colombo
- Gal Vihara in Polonnaruwa
- Statue of Parakramabahu I in Polonnaruwa
- Sangiliyan Statue in Jaffna

== Singapore ==
- The Merlion statues at the Singapore River mouth and on Sentosa
- The Sir Stamford Raffles statue, based on the original by Thomas Woolner, located at the Victoria Concert Hall and at the Raffles Landing Site along Singapore River

== South Africa ==
- Horse Memorial, Port Elizabeth

== Sweden ==
- The Branting Monument in Stockholm.
- Snowdrop (sculpture) at various locations in Sweden

== Timor-Leste ==
- Cristo Rei of Dili, Dili

== Turkey ==
- Aphrodite of Cnidus, famous Hellenistic statue
- Aviation Martyrs' Monument in Istanbul
- Monument of the Republic is located in Taksim Square, İstanbul
- Statue of Humanity unfinished as of 2010

== United Kingdom ==
- Angel of the North
- Dream
- Duke of York Column
- Grey's Monument
- Maiwand Lion
- Nelson's Column
- Statue of St Christopher, Norton Priory
- Statue of Horatio Nelson, Birmingham
- Wellington Statue
- The Lincoln Imp

== United States ==
- Madonna of the Trail
- National Monument to the U.S. Constitution
- History of fountains in the United States

=== Alabama ===
- Vulcan statue, Birmingham, Alabama World's tallest cast iron statue

=== Arkansas ===
- Christ of the Ozarks statue, Eureka Springs

=== California ===
- Partners Statue, Disneyland

=== Florida ===
- Partners Statue, Magic Kingdom, Walt Disney World Resort, Orlando, Florida

=== Illinois ===
- Black Hawk Statue, Oregon
- The Bowman and The Spearman, Chicago
- Chicago Picasso, Chicago
- Cloud Gate, Chicago
- Flamingo, Chicago
- Abraham Lincoln: The Head of State, Chicago
- Miró's Chicago, Chicago
- Nuclear Energy, Chicago
- Standing Lincoln, Chicago
- Forever Marilyn, Chicago
- ‘’Robert Wadlow Statue‘’, Alton

=== Indiana ===
- Soldiers' and Sailors' Monument, Indianapolis
- George Rogers Clark Memorial and statues of George Rogers Clark and Francis Vigo, Vincennes, Indiana

=== Kentucky ===
- Statue of Abraham Lincoln (Hodgenville, Kentucky)
- Statue of Alben W. Barkley, Frankfort
- Statue of Roberto Clemente, Louisville

=== Massachusetts ===
- The Hiker, Fall River
- National Monument to the Forefathers, Plymouth
- Prince Harry the Navigator, Fall River

=== Maryland ===
- Washington Monument, Baltimore
- Washington Monument, Boonsboro

=== Michigan ===
- Cross in the Woods, Indian River
- Fist of Joe Louis, Detroit
- General George Armstrong Custer, Monroe
- George Washington, Detroit
- Sparty, East Lansing
- The Spirit of Detroit, Detroit

=== Minnesota ===
- Iron Man is 81 ft (25 m) tall including the 36-foot-tall (11 m) figure, out of iron ore. Chisholm
- Peanuts statues (Charlie Brown and Snoopy, Linus and Sally, Lucy and Schroeder, Peppermint Patty, and Marcy), St. Paul
- Vision of Peace (Indian God of Peace), Saint Paul City Hall and Ramsey County Courthouse
- Christopher Columbus, Minnesota State Capitol Grounds

=== Missouri ===
- Liberty Memorial, Kansas City, several sculptors, including Robert Aitken and Edmond Amateis were involved.
- Missouri State Capitol, Jefferson City, includes sculpture by Robert Aitken, James Earle Fraser, Karl Bitter, A.A. Weinman, Hermon Atkins MacNeil, Alexander Stirling Calder and Sherry Fry.

=== Montana ===
- James J. Hill statue, Havre, Montana
- Our Lady of the Rockies statue, Butte, Montana

=== Nevada ===
- Burning Man effigy

=== New Jersey ===
- Tapomurti Shri Nilkanth Varni Murti at the Swaminarayan Akshardham (North America)

=== New York ===
- Statue of Liberty (Liberty Enlightening the World), New York City

=== North Dakota ===
- Enchanted Highway, a collection of the world's largest scrap metal sculptures
- Tommy Turtle in Bottineau, North Dakota, the world's largest depicted turtle

=== Ohio ===
- Statues at Great American Ball Park by Tom Tsuchiya, Cincinnati
- King of Kings (destroyed by lightning strike and fire in 2010), near Monroe, Ohio
- Tyler Davidson Fountain, Cincinnati
- Statues at Hope Memorial Bridge, Cleveland
- Fountain of Eternal Life (also known as Peace Arising from the Flames of War), Cleveland

=== Oklahoma ===
- Pioneer Woman, Ponca City

=== Oregon ===
- Oregon Pioneer, Salem
- Portlandia, Portland

=== Pennsylvania ===
- Joe Paterno statue, Beaver Stadium, State College (2001–2011)
- Rocky statue, Philadelphia
- Swann Memorial Fountain, Philadelphia, Alexander Stirling Calder

=== Puerto Rico ===
- Columbus statue, Mayagüez
- Monument to the Puerto Rican Countryman, Salinas

=== South Carolina ===
- Statue of Strom Thurmond on the City Square, of his hometown, Edgefield, South Carolina

=== South Dakota ===
- Crazy Horse Memorial – massive stone sculpture in the Black Hills, depicting the Lakota warrior
- Dignity – 50 foot statue of a Lakota woman in a star quilt, on a bluff above Chamberlain
- Mount Rushmore – faces of four US presidents carved into the granite face of the mountain

=== Texas ===
- Big Tex - 52 feet (16 m) tall temporary statue erected annually for the Texas State Fair.
- Dallas Zoo's giraffe statue
- Statue of Don Juan de Oñate called The Equestrian in El Paso, Texas – at 36 feet (11 m) tall, it is purported by the sculptor to be the largest bronze equestrian statue in the world.
- Statue of Sam Houston in Huntsville, Texas – at 66 feet (20 m) tall, it is the tallest statue of any American political figure.
- Tex Randall – 47-foot (14 m) tall cowboy figure constructed in 1959 next to U.S. Route 60 in Canyon, Texas.

=== Utah ===
- This is the Place Monument at Heritage Park in Salt Lake City
- Brigham Young Monument

=== Virginia ===
- Marine Corps War Memorial, Rosslyn, Virginia

=== Washington ===
- Fremont Troll, Seattle
- Hammering Man, Seattle
- The Lone Sailor, Bremerton
- Statue of Lenin (Seattle)
- Waiting for the Interurban, Seattle
- The Burghers of Calais and The Thinker by Rodin, at Maryhill Museum of Art near Goldendale, Washington

=== Washington, D.C. ===
- Statue of Abraham Lincoln, inside the Lincoln Memorial
- Statue of Thomas Jefferson, inside the Jefferson Memorial

== Vietnam ==
- Christ of Vung Tau, Bà Rịa–Vũng Tàu
- Notre-Dame de Tà Pao (Our Lady Tapao statue), Bình Thuận
- Buddha on Nirvana of Ta Cu, Bình Thuận

== Venezuela ==
- Monumento a la Virgen de la Paz in Venezuela

== By distinction ==
=== Oldest ===
- Löwenmensch figurine

=== Tallest ===
Category	Statue	Image	Location	Country	Completed	Height of statue	Height of statue + base	Coordinates
Tallest statue overall (of Vallabhbhai Patel)	Statue of Unity		Sardar Sarovar Dam, Gujarat	India	2018	182 m (597 ft)	240 m (790 ft)	21°50′16.8″N 73°43′08.7″E
Tallest Buddhist statue (of Vairocana)	Spring Temple Buddha		Lushan, Henan	China	2008	128 m (420 ft)	208 m (682 ft)	33°46′30″N 112°27′03″E
Tallest statue of Gautama Buddha	Laykyun Sekkya		Khatakan Taung, near Monywa, Sagaing Division	Myanmar	2008	115.8 m (380 ft)	129.2 m (424 ft)	22.0803°N 95.2893°E
Tallest Hindu statue excluding base (of Shiva)	Statue of Belief		Nathdwara, Rajasthan	India	2020	106 m (348 ft)	112 m (367 ft)	24.9190°N 73.8178°E
Tallest Christian statue (of Mary)	Mother of All Asia – Tower of Peace		Pagkilatan, Batangas City	Philippines	2021	98.15 m (322.0 ft)	98.15 m (322.0 ft)	13.6423°N 121.0433°E
Tallest Hindu statue including base (of Vishnu and Garuda)	Garuda Wisnu Kencana statue		Garuda Wisnu Kencana Cultural Park, Bali	Indonesia	2018	76 m (249 ft)	122 m (400 ft)	8.813951°S 115.166882°E
Tallest statue of Confucius	Confucius of Mount Ni		Mount Ni, Shandong	China	2016	72 m (236 ft)	72 m (236 ft)	35.4955°N 117.2053°E
Tallest statue of Yang'asha	Yang'asha of Guizhou		Guizhou	China	2017	66 m (217 ft)	88 m (289 ft)	26.7370°N 108.4574°E
Tallest statue of Jesus	Jesus Blessed Sibea-bea		Sibea-bea, North Sumatra	Indonesia	2024	61 m (200 ft)	69 m (226 ft)	2.550703°N 98.671968°E

=== Tallest and largest equestrian statue ===
- Equestrian statue of Genghis Khan near Ulaanbaatar, Mongolia, completed in 2006 has a height of 40 metres (130 feet) on a 10 metres (33 feet) high base.
- Marjing Polo Statue in Marjing Polo Complex, Imphal East, Manipur – 122 feet (37 m), (Note: Many news websites mislead the height as "110 feet", "120 feet", etc.) completed in 2022–2023, is the world's tallest equestrian statue of a polo player
- Monument To Gral. José Gervasio Artigas In Minas, Uruguay – 18 meters tall, 9 meters long, weight 150,000 kilos 1974

=== Largest stone sculptures ===
- Great Sphinx of Giza

=== Metal sculptures ===
- At 54 m wide, the Angel of the North has the largest single dimension.
- The Statue of Liberty is the tallest at 46 m, atop a 47 m pedestal.
- The Enchanted Highway is a collection of the world's largest scrap metal sculptures.
- Vulcan statue, (17m) in Birmingham, Alabama, US, is the largest cast iron statue.

== Other organizational lists ==
- List of equestrian statues
- List of tallest statues
- List of the tallest statues in the United States
- List of Roman domes
- New Seven Wonders of the World
- List of archaeological sites by country
- List of colossal sculpture in situ
- List of megalithic sites
- List of archaeoastronomical sites by country
- List of Egyptian pyramids
- List of Mesoamerican pyramids
- List of equestrian statues in Italy
