= Francis de Saint-Vidal =

French sculptor and medalist

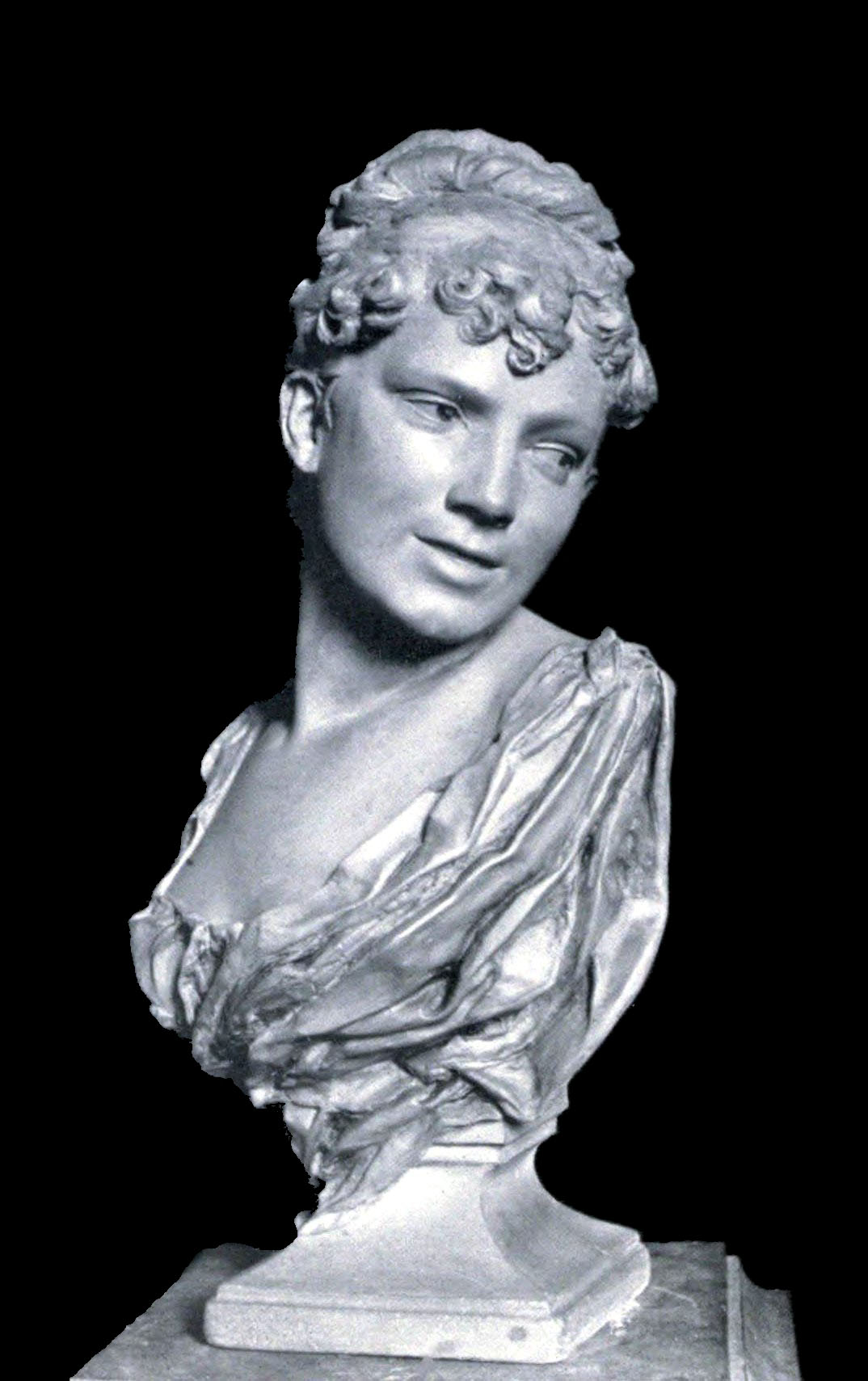
- Bust of Jeanne Granier
- Born: 16 January 1840; Milan, Kingdom of Lombardy–Venetia
- Died: 18 August 1900 (aged 60); Paris, French Third Republic
- Occupation: Sculptor

Francis de Saint-Vidal (16 January 1840 – 18 August 1900) was a 19th-century French sculptor and medalist. He was a pupil of Jean-Baptiste Carpeaux.

== Works ==
- Bust of Ludwig van Beethoven at Musée des beaux-arts de Bordeaux
- La nuit, marble statue, 1884
- Fountain representing the five parts of the world under the Eiffel Tower for the Exposition Universelle (1889), cast produced by the fonderie de Tusey (exact title: La Nuit essayant d'arrêter le génie de la lumière qui s'efforce d'éclairer la vérité - illustration) today on the esplanade des Invalides. It was at the time the subject of a book by Bouniceau-Gesmon and published in Le Monde illustré n° 1656 22 December 1888.
- Bronze statue of Alphonse de Neuville, Place Wagram in Paris, 1889, missing.
- Funerary monument to Alphonse de Neuville at Montmartre Cemetery, 23rd division, 1894.
- Statue of Jean-Baptiste Carpeaux at Musée de l'Histoire de France (Versailles).
- Ain El Fouara Fountain in Sétif (1898)
- Monument in honor of Claude Humbert Piarron de Chamousset (1717–1773), built at the intersection between rue Bonaparte and rue de l'Abbaye in Saint-Germain-des-Prés and inaugurated 3 September 1900 by President Émile Loubet.
- Monument to Hector Berlioz (and in Mainz a work after this monument by Francis de Saint-Vidal).
