= Preaching Buddha =

Preaching Buddha may refer to:

- Seated Buddha from Gandhara, a 2nd- or 3rd-century Gandharan sculpture from Jamal Garhi, in modern-day Pakistan
- Buddha Preaching his First Sermon (Sarnath), a 5th-century sculpture from Sarnath, India
- Badulla Preaching Buddha, a 6th-century sculpture from Badulla, Sri Lanka
- Preaching Buddha (Salt Lake City), a 20th-century replica of the Sarnath Buddha in the International Peace Gardens, Salt Lake City, Utah, United States
