= Chamousset =

Chamousset may refer to:

- Claude Humbert Piarron de Chamousset
- Chamousset, a commune of the Savoie département, in France
