= Nyoman Nuarta =

Indonesian sculptor (born 1951)

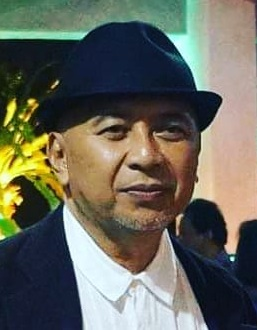
- Nuarta in 2016
- Born: 14 November 1951 (age 74); Tabanan, Bali Residency, Lesser Sunda (now in Bali), Indonesia
- Years active: 1979–present

I Nyoman Nuarta (born 14 November 1951) is an Indonesian sculptor and artist who created a number of monuments across Indonesia.

His "most ambitious and notable" work was the Garuda Wisnu Kencana Statue in Bali's GWK Park, completed in 2018. Officiated by president Joko Widodo, the statue stands 121 meters tall and weighs over 4,000 tonnes; at the time of its creation, it was the tallest statue of a Hindu deity and it is currently the tallest statue in Indonesia.

Other works include the Jalesveva Jayamahe Monument in Surabaya; and the Indonesian Proclamation Monument in Proclamation Park, his first major work.

The Linda Gallery claims Nuarta's work "[reflects] on important Balinese life philosophies." He is a member of the International Sculpture Center in the US the Royal Society of Sculptors in the UK.

== Early life ==
Nyoman Nuarta was born in Tabanan, Bali on November 14, 1951. Nyoman Nuarta is the sixth son of nine children from the couple Wirjamidjana and Samudra. He spent his childhood in the village of Tegallinggah, Bali.

Nuarta was raised by his uncle, Ketut Dharma Susila, an art teacher and Kelihan Adat (village chief).

== Education ==
In the early 1970s, Nuarta travelled to the city of Bandung, West Java to receive an arts education. In 1972, he enrolled in the Faculty of Art and Design (FSRD) of the Bandung Institute of Technology. He graduated circa 1979 with a degree in fine arts.

== Career ==
He joined the Indonesian New Art Movement while an ITB student in 1977. In 1979, shortly before his graduation, he won the Proclamation Monument Contest held in celebration of Indonesian Independence Day; his monument stands in Proclamation Park. Following this, "Nuarta was appointed to build the statue of Sukarno, the founding father and first president of Indonesia."

In 2000, Nuarta opened NuArt Sculpture Park, a 4-hectare sculpture park in Bandung, West Java privately owned and managed by Nuarta. It displays a variety of his works and houses a custom 4-story building used for exhibitions and meeting rooms.

In 2011, he designed the Indonesian Basketball League Championship Trophy, which was 22 by 22 centimeters wide with a height of 48 cm and a weight of 22 kg, made of copper and plated in 22 karat gold.

In 2018, the Indian government bestowed Nuarta with the Padma Award.

== Gallery ==
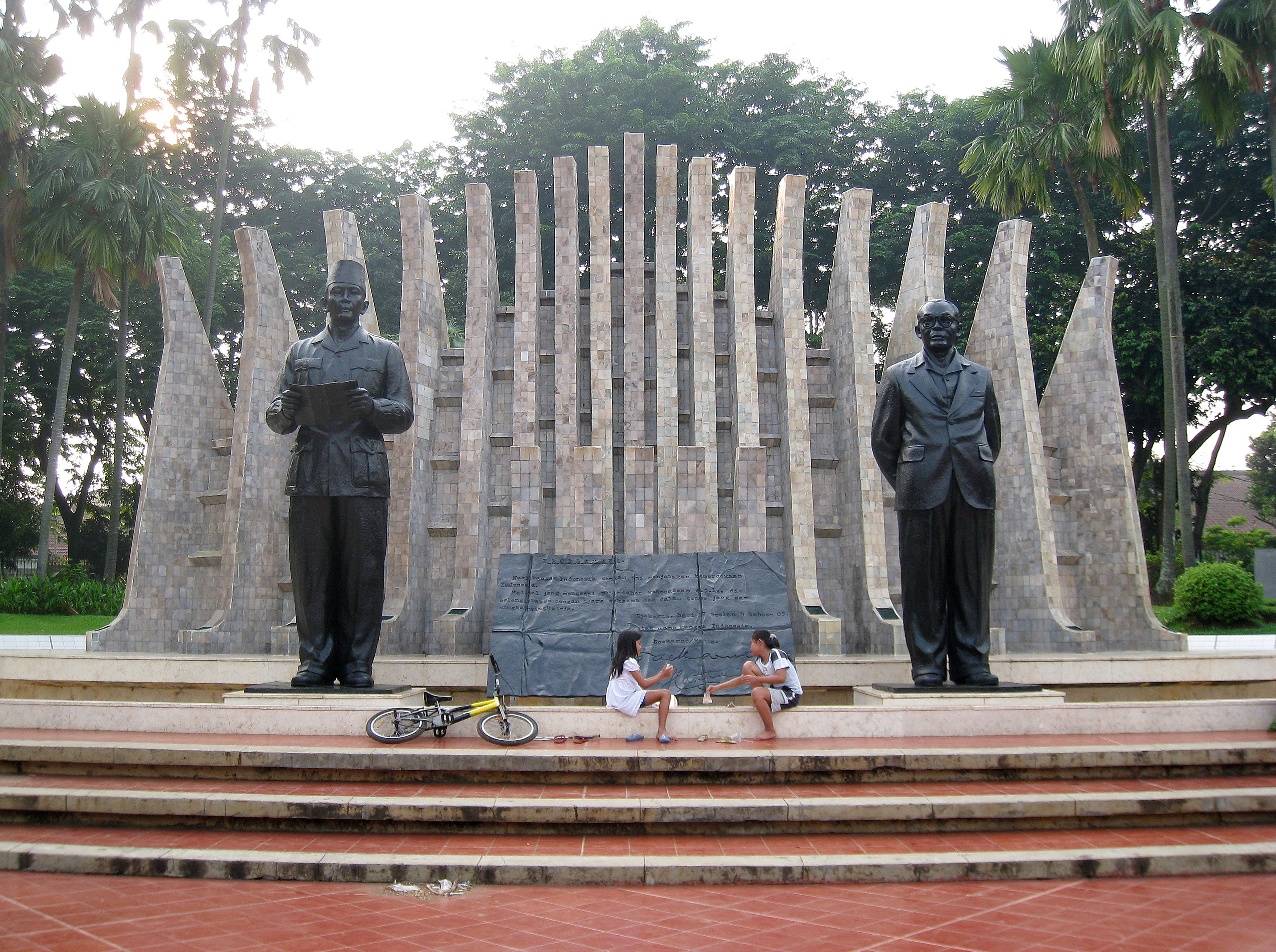
The Proclamation Monument in Taman Proklamasi, designed for a content while Nuarta was a student; inaugurated 1980
