= Claude Humbert Piarron de Chamousset =

French physician (1717–1773)

Claude Humbert Piarron de Chamousset (1717 – April 1773) was a French master at the Court of Auditors, physician and philanthropist. He did struggle against the overcrowded hospitals (several patients in a single bed) and used his own fortune to take care of poor people in his own hotel. That example was followed, and the 'Hotel-Dieu" was reformed according to his principles. He is quoted in the "Mémoires" of Madame de Genlis (chapter III). Born in Paris, he was the originator of mutual benefit societies. According to A. Piron (1838), in 1758 he established a new postal system at Paris charging two sols for a single letter under one ounce, replacing the earlier postal system established in 1653 by Jean-Jacques Renouard de Villayer.

He is buried at Saint-Nicolas-du-Chardonnet (5th arrondissement of Paris) 28 April 1773

A monument in his honor was realized by Francis de Saint-Vidal (1840–1900), built at the intersection between rue Bonaparte and rue de l'Abbaye in Saint-Germain-des-Prés and inaugurated 3 September 1900 by President Émile Loubet.
