= Buduruwagala Museum =

Archaeological museum in Buduruwagala, Sri Lanka

Buduruwagala Archaeological Museum
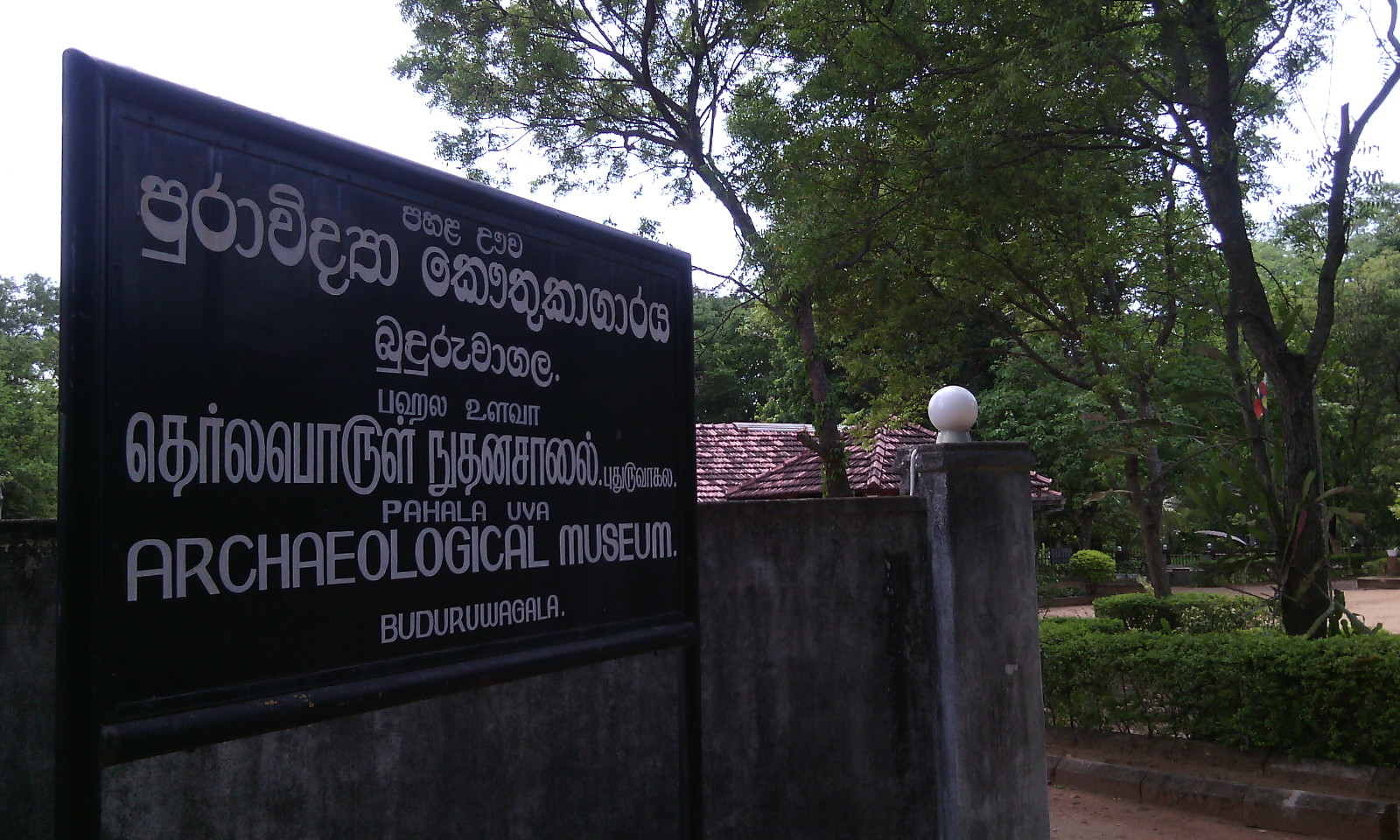
- Archaeological Museum, Buduruwagala
- Established: 1988
- Location: Buduruwagala, Sri Lanka
- Coordinates: 6°41′27″N 81°06′25″E
- Type: Archaeological
- Website: http://www.archaeology.gov.lk

Buduruwagala Archaeological Museum is a regional museum located in Buduruwagala, Sri Lanka. It was founded in 1988 and owned by Department of Archaeology of Sri Lanka.

The museum is used to show archaeological objects found in Buduruwagala area and also exhibits relics belonging to Anuradhapura, Polonnaruwa and Kandy periods.

== Opening hours ==
The museum is open from 8.30 AM to 5.00 PM and close on Tuesday.

== See also ==
- List of museums in Sri Lanka
