= Garuda Wisnu Kencana statue =

Statue in Bali, Indonesia

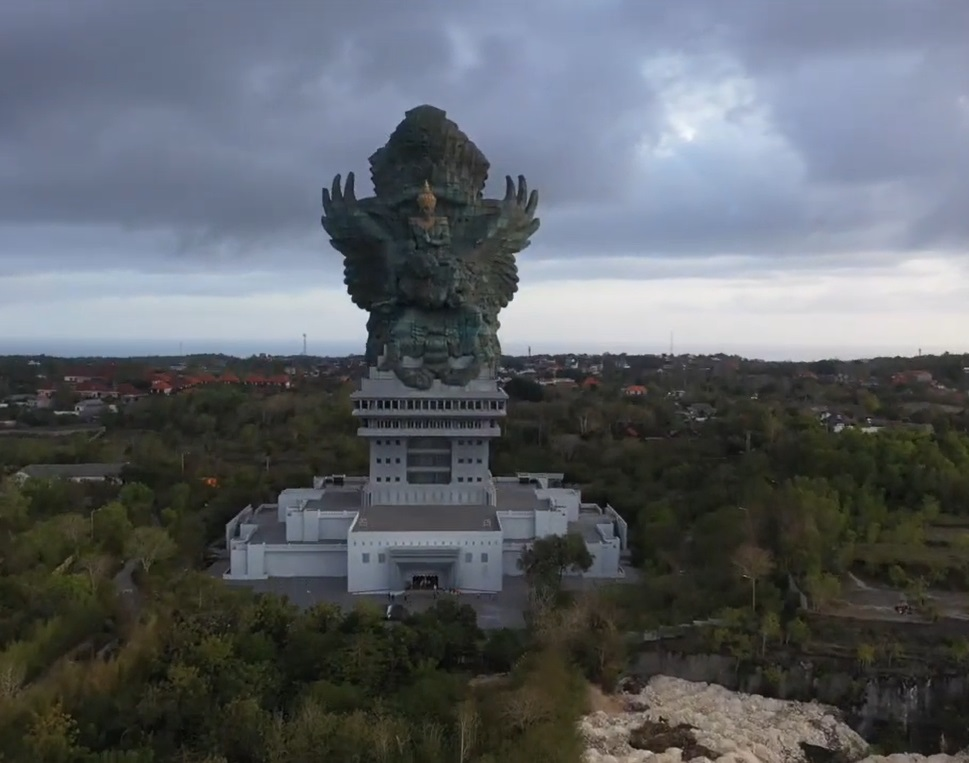
- Interactive map of Garuda Wisnu Kencana statue
- Location: Garuda Wisnu Kencana Cultural Park, Indonesia
- Coordinates: 8.813951°S 115.166882°E
- Designer: Nyoman Nuarta
- Type: statue
- Material: copper and brass sheet, steel frame, reinforced concrete core
- Width: 66 m (217 ft)
- Height: 122 m (400 ft)
- Beginning date: 1993
- Completion date: 31 July 2018
- Opening date: 22 September, 2018
- Dedicated to: Garuda and Vishnu

Garuda Wisnu Kencana statue (also known as GWK statue) is a 121-meter-tall statue located in Garuda Wisnu Kencana Cultural Park, Bali, Indonesia. It was designed by Nyoman Nuarta and inaugurated in September 2018. The total height of the monument, including the 46-meter base pedestal is 121 m (397 ft). The statue was designed to be Indonesia’s tallest statue, and is inspired by an event that finds its roots in Hinduism about Garuda's search for amrita, the elixir of life. According to this story, Garuda agreed to be ridden by Vishnu in return for the right to use the elixir to liberate his enslaved mother. The monument was completed on 31 July 2018 and inaugurated by Indonesian President Joko Widodo on 22 September 2018. It is the tallest statue of a Hindu deity and the tallest statue in Indonesia.

Construction took twenty-eight years and around $100 million.

== History ==
GWK was designed in 1990 by Nyoman Nuarta under the then-Tourism Minister Joop Ave, Energy Minister Ida Bagus Sudjana and Governor of Bali Ida Bagus Oka. The groundbreaking event of the statue’s construction took place 1997. In the late 1990s, the project was halted due to the 1997 Asian financial crisis.

Construction resumed in 2013 after a sixteen year hiatus, when property developer PT. Alam Sutera Realty Tbk (ASR) agreed to financing the construction of the statue and the project. The idea for the monument was not without controversy; religious authorities on the island complained that its massive size might disrupt the spiritual balance of the island, and that its commercial nature was inappropriate, but some groups agreed with the project as it would attract tourism.

=== Symbolism ===
Designed to be Indonesia’s tallest statue, Garuda Wisnu Kencana was inspired by a story from Hindu mythology about the search for Amrita (the elixir of life). According to that, Garuda agreed to be ridden by Vishnu in return for the right to use the elixir to liberate his enslaved mother.

== Fabrication and dimensions ==
The statue was assembled in Bali from 754 discrete modules that were constructed in Bandung, West Java and then transported to the work site. The modules were cut into 1,500 smaller pieces to accommodate the cranes maximum load. The last piece that was placed onto the gigantic artwork was at its tail, which is located at the highest point of the statue. Garuda's shape is so complex that engineers have designed special joints in the supporting structure, with up to 11 enormous steel girders coming together at the same point, whereas normal construction joints have four or six girders. The Garuda Wisnu Kencana statue is designed to withstand storms and earthquakes, and expected to last for the next 100 years.

The 75 m (246 ft) tall, 65 m (213 ft) wide statue was designed by Nyoman Nuarta. It sits atop a pedestal to bring the total height of the monument to 121 m (397 ft), which is nearly 30 m (98 ft) taller than the Statue of Liberty in the United States. The completed monument is about as tall as a 21-story building. It weighs 4000 tonnes, making it the heaviest statue in the country. The statue is made of copper and brass sheeting, with a stainless steel frame and skeleton, as well as a steel and concrete core column. The outer covering measures 22,000 m^{2} (240,000 sq ft) in area. The crown of Visnu is covered with golden mosaics and the statue has a dedicated lighting arrangement. The monument was completed on 31 July 2018 and inaugurated by Indonesian President Joko Widodo on 22 September 2018.

== Gallery ==
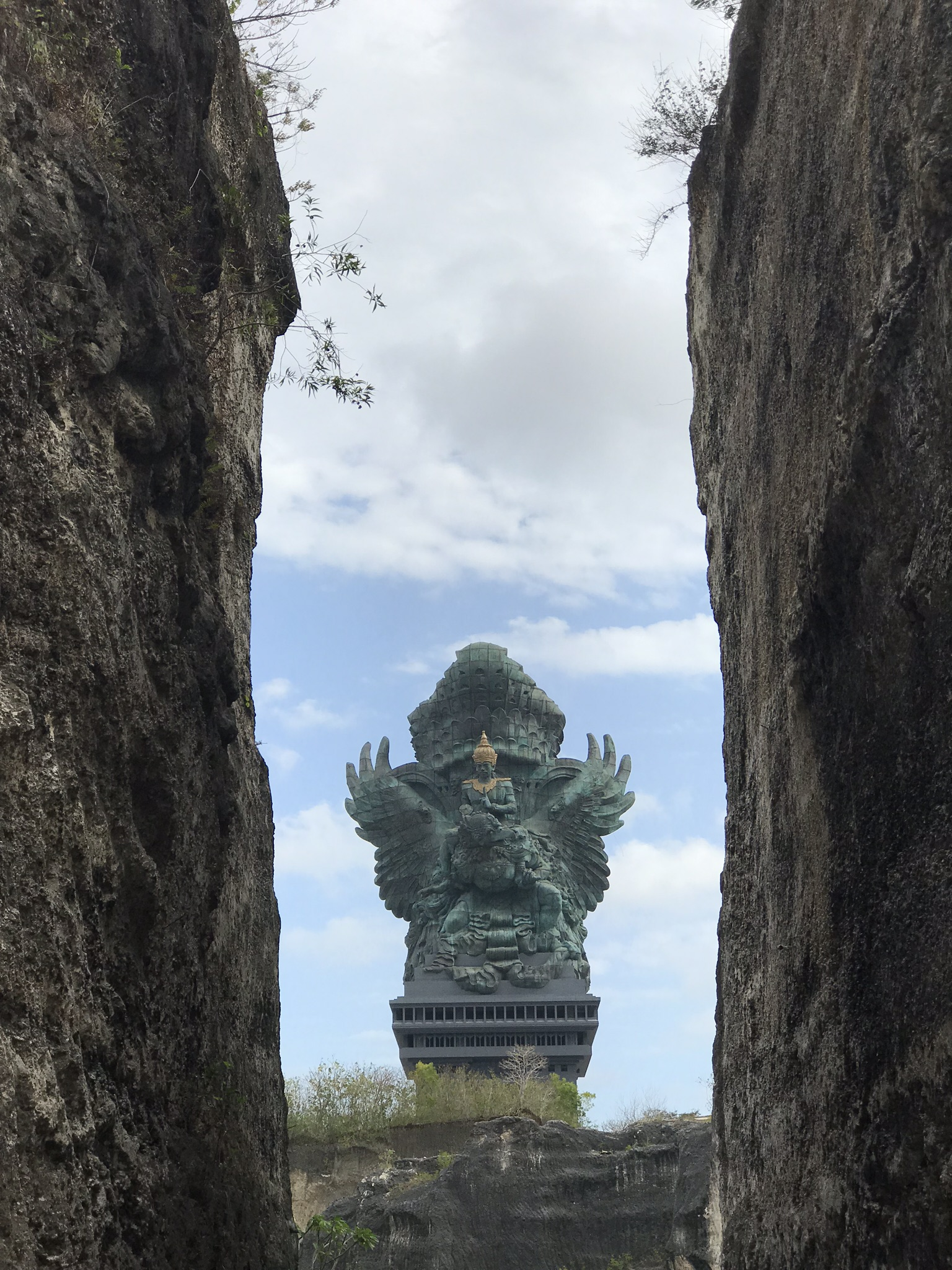
Statue viewed from Garuda Wisnu Kencana Cultural Park, 2019

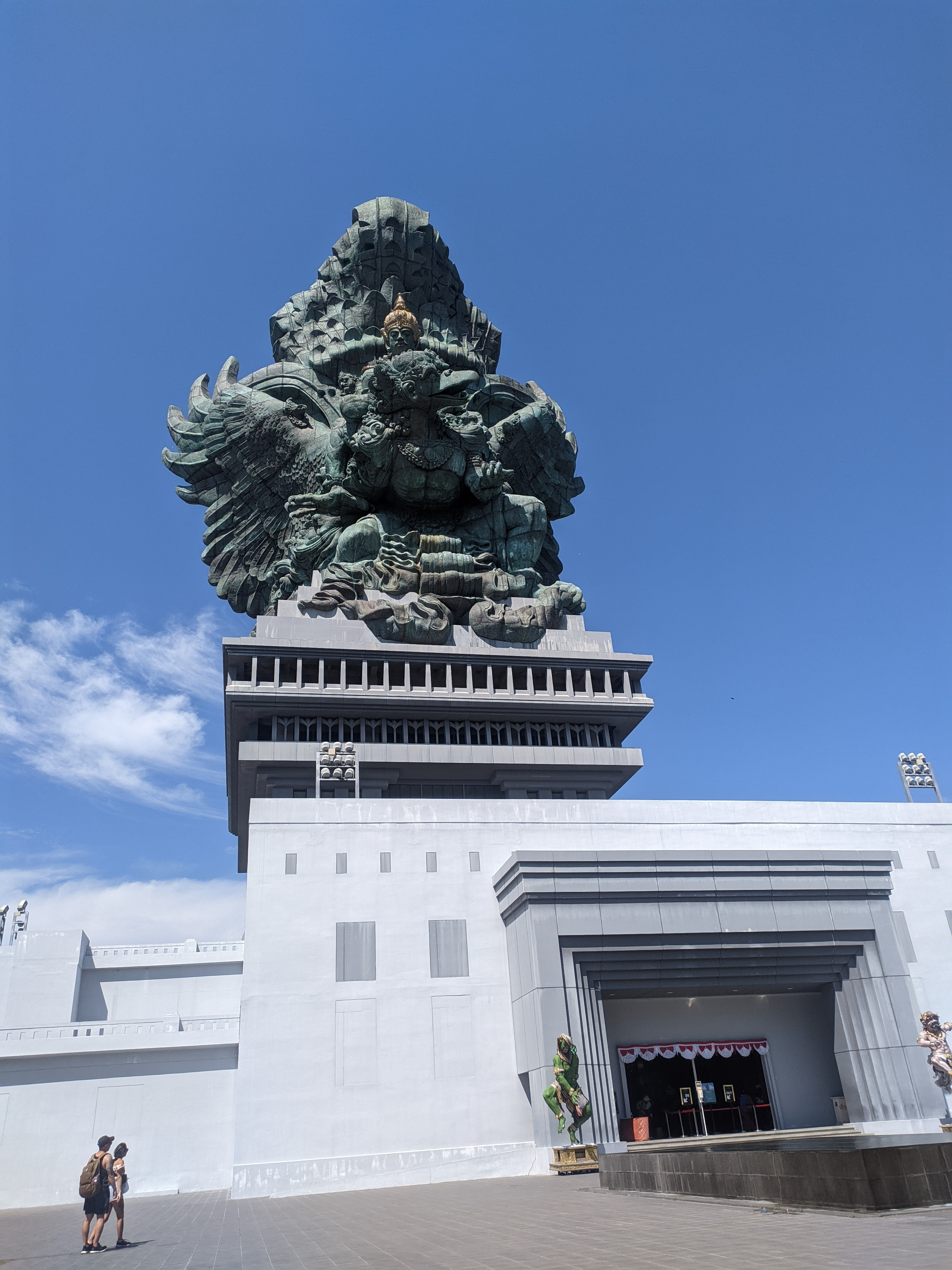
Statue viewed from below and nearby

== See also ==
- List of tallest statues
