= Johanna Masdani =

Woman involved in Indonesian independence

- Born: 29 November 1910; Amurang, Minahasa, North Sulawesi, Dutch East Indies
- Died: 13 May 2006 (aged 95); Jakarta, Indonesia
- Education: University of Indonesia

Johanna Tumbuan Masdani (29 November 1910 - 13 May 2006), also known as Jo Masdani, was a pioneering figure in Indonesian independence. She was born Johanna Tumbuan in Amurang, in the region of Minahasa in North Sulawesi. She was present during two important events in Indonesian history, namely the Youth Pledge during the Second Youth Congress (or Kongres Pemuda Kedua) in 1928 and the Proclamation of Indonesian Independence in 1945. She graduated and taught in the Faculty of Psychology at the University of Indonesia.

== Biography ==
Johanna was among those who attended the Second Youth Congress in October 1928 and took part in pledging the Youth Pledge. In addition, Johanna also witnessed the Proclamation of Indonesian Independence that was announced by Sukarno and Mohammad Hatta on 17 August 1945. A year later, Masdani organized the building of a monument to commemorate the proclamation event. The monument was built in front of Sukarno's house where the proclamation took place on 56 Pegangsaan Timur Street (now Proklamasi Street) in Jakarta, which is now Proclamation Park (or Taman Proklamasi). This is a different monument from the monument featuring Sukarno and Hatta in the same park.

In 1961, Masdani completed her studies in the Faculty of Psychology at the University of Indonesia. She became a psychiatrist and also taught at her almamater. She continued her studies in the United States and Britain after her husband, Masdani, died in October 1967.

Johanna Tumbuan Masdani died on 13 May 2006 and was buried in Kalibata Heroes' Cemetery on 15 May 2006.

== Honors ==
Johanna Masdani was acknowledged by the Indonesian government several times through the conferring of several honors:

- Sewindu Angkatan Perang Republik Indonesia (1954), conferred by Ali Sastroamidjojo.
- Guerrilla Star (or Bintang Gerilya) (1958), conferred by President Sukarno.
- Commemoration Medal of Independence Campaign I and II (or Satya Lencana Peristiwa Kemerdekaan I dan II) (1958), conferred by Defense Minister Djuanda Kartawidjaja.
- Commemoration Medal of Military Operation I and II (or Satya Lencana Gerakan Operasi Militer I and II) (1958), conferred by Defense Minister Djuanda Kartawidjaja.
- Satya Lencana Penegak (1967), conferred by President Suharto.
- Star of Mahaputera (or Bintang Mahaputera Utama) (1998), conferred by President Habibie.
