= Taman Proklamasi =

Park in Jakarta

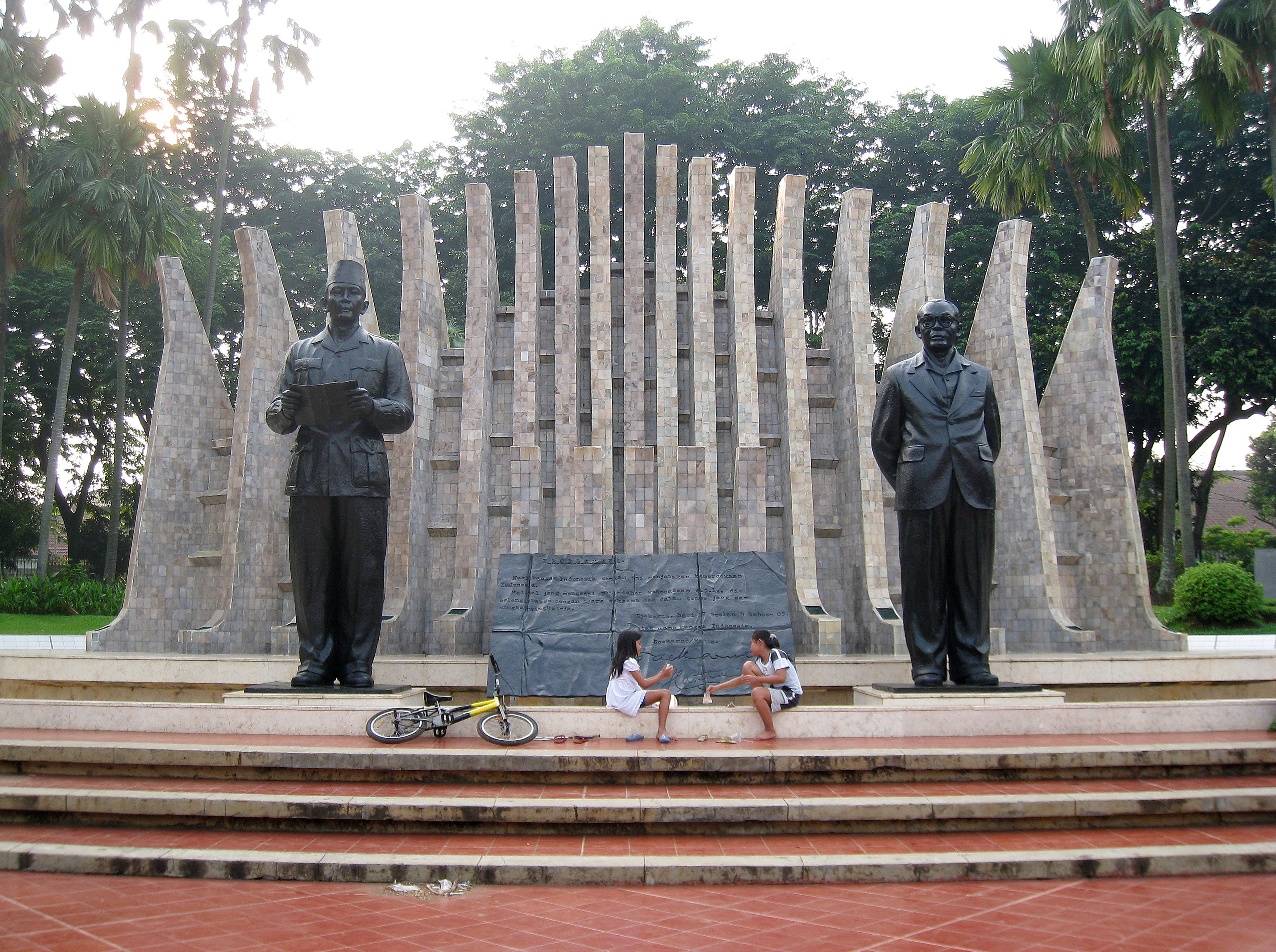
Monument of the Proclamator Heroes Sukarno-Hatta in the Taman Proklamasi, Jakarta by sculptor Nyoman Nuarta

Taman Proklamasi (Proclamation Park) is a park complex located in Central Jakarta, Indonesia. The park is located at the former property of Sukarno at what was known as the house at Jalan Pegangsaan Timur 56. The house, now demolished, is where the Proclamation of Indonesian Independence was first read by Sukarno.

== History ==
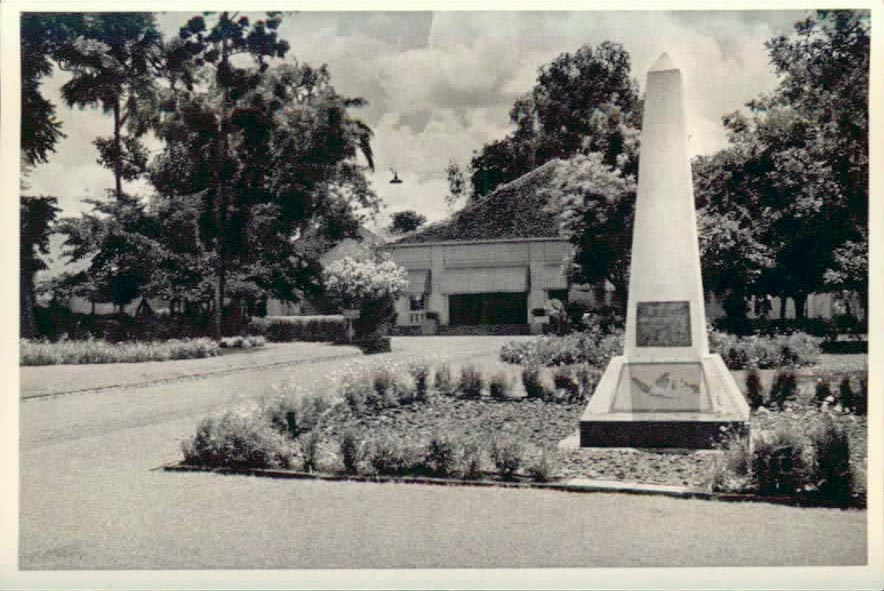
The house complete with commemorative monument around 1950s. Both have since been demolished and are part of the current Tugu Proklamasi complex.

Taman Proklamasi complex was located at a plot of land where the former residence of Sukarno at Jalan Pegangsaan Timur 56. President Sukarno declared the independence of Indonesia on August 17, 1945 from the front porch of this house. The house then became known as Gedung Proklamasi (Proclamation Building).

To mark the first anniversary of the declaration of Indonesian independence, a memorial – in the shape of a small obelisk – was built in 1946 by a group of women in Djakarta. This memorial, known as the Memorial Satu Tahun Republik Indonesia (One Year Anniversary of Indonesian Republic Memorial), was built at the front lawn of the Proclamation Building. Later the memorial was renamed Tugu Proklamasi (Proclamation Monument).

Since then, the youths and students of Indonesia held an annual ceremony to celebrate the Declaration of Indonesian Independence on August 17. Following the full transfer of Indonesian sovereignty in 1950, the Proclamation Park was annually visited by both the President and the Vice President of Indonesia to laid flowers and honor the lost soldiers of the country. The ceremony was also attended by guests from other countries.

Since 1956, the popularity of Taman Proklamasi as ceremonial gathering place began to decline. Despite the advice of the city elders to have the house renovated, in the evening of August 15, 1960, Sukarno ordered the demolition of both the house and the Tugu Proklamasi memorial. According to Sukarno, Tugu Proklamasi was actually Tugu Linggarjati. His statement was not clear, but apparently Sukarno thought that both the house and the monument were not grand enough to be national monuments despite their historical significance. The three fragments of marble from the Tugu Proklamasi was then kept in the house of Jo Masdani as a memorial. The memorial was rebuilt in 1972 under the proposal of governor Ali Sadikin.

On January 1, 1961, President Sukarno inaugurated the construction of Tugu Petir, later also known as the Proclamation Monument.

In 1972, the construction of the modernist Gedung Proklamasi (Proclamation Building) – now the Gedung Perintis Kemerdekaan (Independence Pioneers' Building) – was started. In the same year, the Tugu Proklamasi which was demolished earlier was rebuilt in similar design.

On August 17, 1980, the last monument of the Taman Proklamasi, the grand-sized Monument of the Proclamator Heroes Sukarno-Hatta, was inaugurated by President Suharto.

== Monuments ==
There are three memorials in the Taman Proklamasi: Memorial Satu Tahun Republik Indonesia, Tugu Petir, and Monumen Pahlawan Proklamator Sukarno-Hatta.

=== Memorial Satu Tahun Republik Indonesia ===
The Memorial Satu Tahun Republik Indonesia (Memorial to the First Anniversary of the Republic of Indonesia) was the first monument to be built in Taman Proklamasi. It was inaugurated on August 17, 1946 by Prime Minister Sutan Sjahrir during the Allied occupation. The memorial is in the shape of a small obelisk, with an inscription "Atas Usaha Wanita Jakarta" ("with the effort of the women of Jakarta"), a depiction of the manuscript of the Indonesian independence, and a map of Indonesia. Shortly after, the memorial was renamed Tugu Proklamasi.

Tugu Proklamasi was initiated by several women figures of Indonesia, such as Jo Masdani, Mien Wiranatakusumah, Zus Ratulangi (daughter of Sam Ratulangi), Zubaedah, and Ms. Gerung. The sketch of the memorial was done by Kores Siregar, a student from the Bandung Institute of Technology. The construction started in July 1946. On the eve of the inauguration of the memorial in mid-August, the mayor of Jakarta Suwiryo refused to inaugurate the memorial due to a perceived safety issue. During the proposed time of the inauguration, the Allies had occupied Jakarta and there was a concern that they would start a massacre similar with the Amritsar massacre in India.

Despite the perceived concern, the women-initiators of the construction of Tugu Proklamasi decided to contact the prime minister Sutan Sjahrir in the afternoon of August 16, 1946 to lead the inauguration of the memorial. Sutan Sjahrir was willing to lead the inauguration and so he took a flight to Jakarta from Yogyakarta to inaugurate the memorial, which pushed through without incident.

On August 14, 1960, the Keng Po newspaper reported that the Angkatan '45 (45 Generation) wanted the Tugu Proklamasi, mentioned as "Tugu Linggarjati", to be destroyed. Following the reports, Sukarno ordered the demolition of Tugu Proklamasi and the Proclamation Building in the evening of August 15, 1960. The circumstances were strange because the Linggadjati Agreement took place on November 10, 1946, whereas the Tugu Proklamasi was inaugurated on August 17, 1946. According to Jo Masdani, at that time the Communist Party of Indonesia had significant power to change the history. After the demolition of the memorial, three slabs of marble from the original monument was given to Jo Masdani as a memorial.

In 1968, the governor of Jakarta Ali Sadikin submitted a proposal to rebuild the original memorial that was demolished by Sukarno in 1960. This proposal was approved and on August 17, 1972, the Proclamation Monument was re-inaugurated at its original location. The inauguration was attended by many public and political figures, among them were the former Vice President Hatta.

=== Tugu Petir ===
Tugu Petir or Tugu Kilat (Lightning Monument) is in the form of a 17-metre (56 ft) tall pole topped with a lightning symbol. The memorial marks the spot where Sukarno stood while reading the proclamation text. On the base of the monument is a metal inscription "Disinilah Dibatjakan Proklamasi Kemerdekaan Indonesia pada Tanggal 17 Agustus 1945 djam 10.00 pagi oleh Bung Karno dan Bung Hatta" ("This is where the Proclamation of Indonesian Independence was narrated on 17 August 1945 at 10 in the morning by Bung Karno and Bung Hatta") The lightning symbolizes the thundering of the Indonesian declaration of independence.

=== Monumen Pahlawan Proklamator Sukarno-Hatta ===
Monumen Pahlawan Proklamator Sukarno-Hatta (Monument of the Proclamator Heroes Sukarno-Hatta) depicts two bronze statues of Sukarno and Hatta standing side by side. Each statue weighed 1,200 kilograms (2,600 pounds), and was about 4.6 m (15 ft) and 4.3 m (14 ft) in height. The posture of the figures was taken from the photographic documentation when the proclamation was first read. The figures flank a bronze stone tablet measuring 196 cm × 290 cm (6.43 ft × 9.51 ft), and weighed 600 kg (1,300 lb); the slab depicts the manuscript of the proclamation of Indonesian independence. On the background of the statues were monolithic sculptures numbered 17, with the highest being 8 m (26 ft), with 45 protrusions on the cascade waterfalls, symbolizing the date of August 17, 1945. The monument was inaugurated on August 17, 1980.

== Cited works ==
- Farrel M. Rizqy, ed. (2009). Bung Karno – Di Antara Saksi dan Peristiwa [Bung Karno – Between Witnesses and Events] (in Indonesian). Jakarta: Kompas. ISBN 9789797094096.
- Merrillees, Scott (2015). Jakarta: Portraits of a Capital 1950-1980. Jakarta: Equinox Publishing. ISBN 9786028397308.
- Woro Miswati (2011). INDONESIA MERDEKA. Jakarta: Be Champion. ISBN 9786028884334.
