= Ain El Fouara Fountain =

Monument in Sétif, Algeria

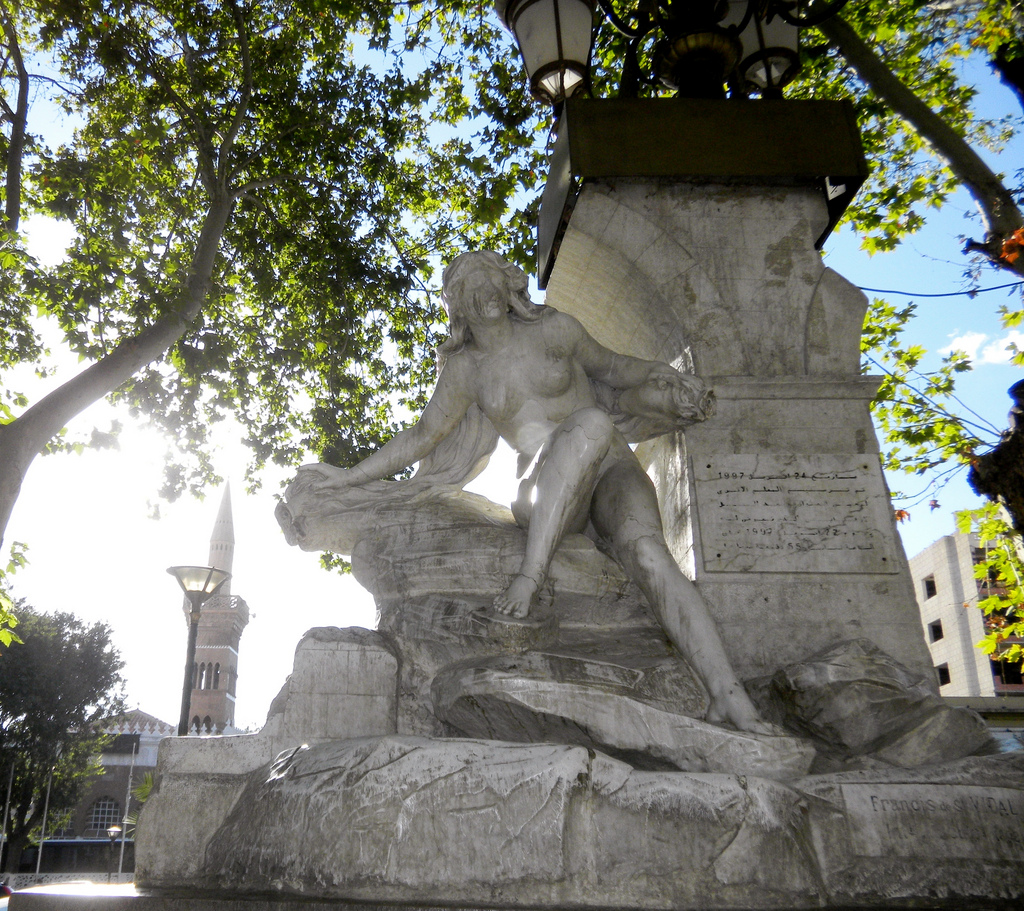
- Monument on the fountain in 2015
- Interactive map of Ain El Fouara Fountain
- Location: Algeria, Sétif
- Coordinates: 36°11′22″N 5°24′18″E
- Builder: Francis de Saint-Vidal
- Type: Monument
- Opening date: 1898

Ain El Fouara Fountain (Arabic: نافورة عين الفوارة, lit. 'fountain spring gushing') is an emblematic and famous monument of Sétif in Algeria. This fountain consists of a statue made in 1898 by the French sculptor Francis de Saint-Vidal. The statue, representing a totally naked woman, is the subject of several acts of vandalism.

The sculpture made of white stone and marble, located in the city of Setif, Algeria. It was constructed in 1898 and is associated with a spring from which it draws its water. The fountain is situated at the center of Independence Square in Setif and is considered one of the city's landmarks. It has been the subject of poetry and literary works by Algerian and Arab writers.

== History ==
Ain El Fouara Fountain was sculpted by the French-Italian artist Francis de Saint-Vidal in July 1898, during the World Sculpture Exhibition at the Louvre Museum in France. The sculpture was initially displayed at the Louvre to commemorate the 100th anniversary of the construction of the Eiffel Tower. Upon seeing it, the French military governor of Setif admired the piece and decided to have it transferred to Setif. This is one of the many stories surrounding the history of the marble statue.

A different version of the story traces the sculpture's origin back to the reign of King Louis II of France. The king allegedly had a secret love affair with Queen Valentine of Britain, a relationship that remained hidden due to royal customs and the cultural differences between their peoples. Following her suicide, driven by his refusal to marry her, Louis II ordered the French sculptor San Vidal to carve a statue of the queen in her memory. He initially planned to send the statue to Britain, but the British authorities rejected it. The sculpture remained in storage for years, until it was rediscovered during the French occupation and the Second World War. One of the sculptors, finding the statue in a poor condition, cleaned and restored it.

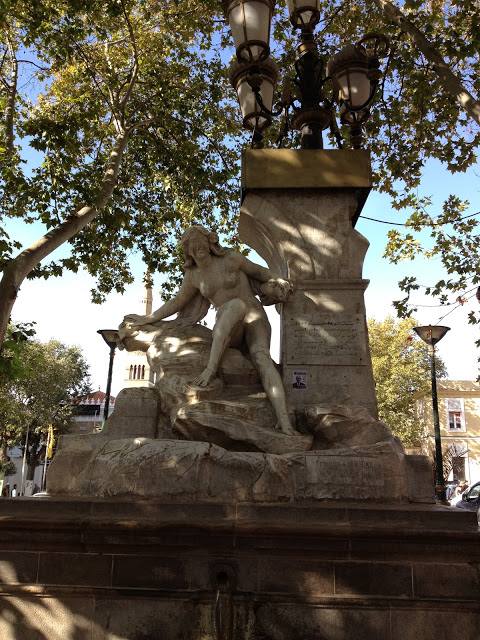
Ain El Fouara

During celebrations in France marking the victory over the Nazis, the statue was gifted to the military governor of Setif, who had conscripted local youth to fight against the Germans. The statue was placed in Independence Square in Setif, with the fountain built around it, symbolizing a Roman bath, due to the area's connection to water and its proximity to the cathedral.

Before its use as a fountain, the area known as Ain El Fouara Square was a large, architecturally stunning site, adorned with marble and intricate zellige tiles. These tiles, produced by Algerian artisans of high skill, were used in many buildings in France and across the world, even reaching America in the 18th century. However, during the French colonial period, much of the Islamic and Algerian heritage was erased, with these artistic contributions wrongly attributed to the French.

== Cultural Significance and Controversy ==
Ain El Fouara Fountain has become an integral part of Setif's cultural identity, to the extent that the city is often referred to as the "City of Ain El Fouara." Its central location serves as a popular meeting point for locals and symbolizes continuity and resilience. Some even view the fountain with reverence, believing it brings blessings.

The sculpture has been celebrated in poetry and music by notable figures such as Iraqi poet Mahmoud Razzaq Al-Hakim, Algerian poet Sadeq Gharbi, and artists Samir Staifi and Abdelkarim Belkheir.

However, the statue has also faced opposition from some Algerians with conservative views. Critics argue that the depiction of a partially nude woman is indecent and violates religious principles against representational art. They have called for the removal of the statue, claiming it contradicts moral and religious values.

In contrast, many residents, including writer and journalist Saadi Nacer Eddine, who spent his childhood in Setif, oppose such demands. They view these criticisms as a recent phenomenon driven by growing conservative ideologies. Interestingly, the head of the team that reassembled the fountain after its first vandalism incident was a veteran of the anti-colonial struggle, sentenced to death by the French authorities for his resistance activities.

== Attempts to vandalize the sculpture ==
Ain El Fouara Fountain has sparked debate, particularly among conservative and religious circles in Algeria. Abdel Fattah Hamadache, leader of the Salafist Awakening Front, called on the authorities to remove the statue, labeling it an "idol" and an act of polytheism.

In August 2015, the imam of the Abu Dhar Al-Ghafari Mosque in Constantine issued what could be described as a religious ruling, prohibiting drinking water from the fountain. He argued that bending to drink from it constitutes an act of worship to what he termed an "idol," thereby considering it an act of disbelief in God.

Previously, Islamic scholar Cheikh Chamseddine Bouroubi proposed a compromise, suggesting that the statue be covered with a Staifi robe. His proposal aimed to reconcile religious sensitivities with the city's cultural heritage, preserving the statue while addressing concerns over its depiction of the human form.

=== First sabotage ===
On Tuesday, April 22, 1997, during Algeria's Black Decade, a group detonated a bomb beneath the Ain El Fouara Fountain, shattering the statue into numerous pieces. This act of vandalism provoked widespread outrage among the residents of Setif. In response, local authorities swiftly restored the statue, completing the repairs in less than 24 hours. The rapid reconstruction was seen as a defiant gesture to preserve the city's cultural heritage despite the turbulent times.

=== Second sabotage ===
On December 18, 2017, a man vandalized the Ain El Fouara Fountain in a widely publicized incident. Official reports described the perpetrator as mentally unstable, while other sources suggested he was ideologically driven. Despite attempts by bystanders to intervene, the man caused significant damage to the statue.

The incident sparked public condemnation, with many residents viewing the act as an attack on their cultural identity and historical legacy. In response, the Algerian Ministry of Culture reaffirmed its commitment to restoring the statue using scientific conservation methods.

== See also ==
- Aniconism in Islam
- List of cultural assets of Algeria
