= Jalesveva Jayamahe Monument =

Public statue

- Monjaya
- Interactive map of Jalesveva Jayamahe Monument
- Location: Port of Tanjung Perak, Surabaya, Indonesia
- Coordinates: 7°11′43.6″S 112°44′22.4″E
- Designer: I Nyoman Nuarta
- Type: Statue
- Height: Statue: 30.6 metres (100 ft); Including base: 60.6 metres (199 ft)
- Beginning date: 5 December 1990
- Opening date: 5 December 1996; 29 years ago
- Dedicated to: Indonesian Navy
- Website: Jalesveva Jayamahe

The Jalesveva Jayamahe Monument (Indonesian: Monumen Jalesveva Jayamahe, abbreviated Monjaya) is a monument located in Semampir, Surabaya, East Java, Indonesia near the Port of Tanjung Perak. It is a statue of an Indonesian Navy officer wearing a Ceremonial Service Dress, complete with his sword of honor. The officer is depicted staring into the ocean, looking as if he is challenging the tides. It is meant to represent the preparedness of the Indonesian Navy for any scenario. The statue stands at a height of 60.6 meters (199ft), about the same as the adjacent building. The Jalesveva Jayamahe Monument represents the nation's future generation's optimism toward the accomplishment of the Indonesian dream.

== Etymology ==
The monument's name is taken from the Indonesian Navy's motto in Sanskrit Jalesveva Jayamahe which means Our Glory is at the Seas, It is also related to Indonesian Navy's Motto Jalesveva Jayamahe – "On The waters, We are victorious" (Jalesu eva – in the waters Jayamahe – we win).

== History ==
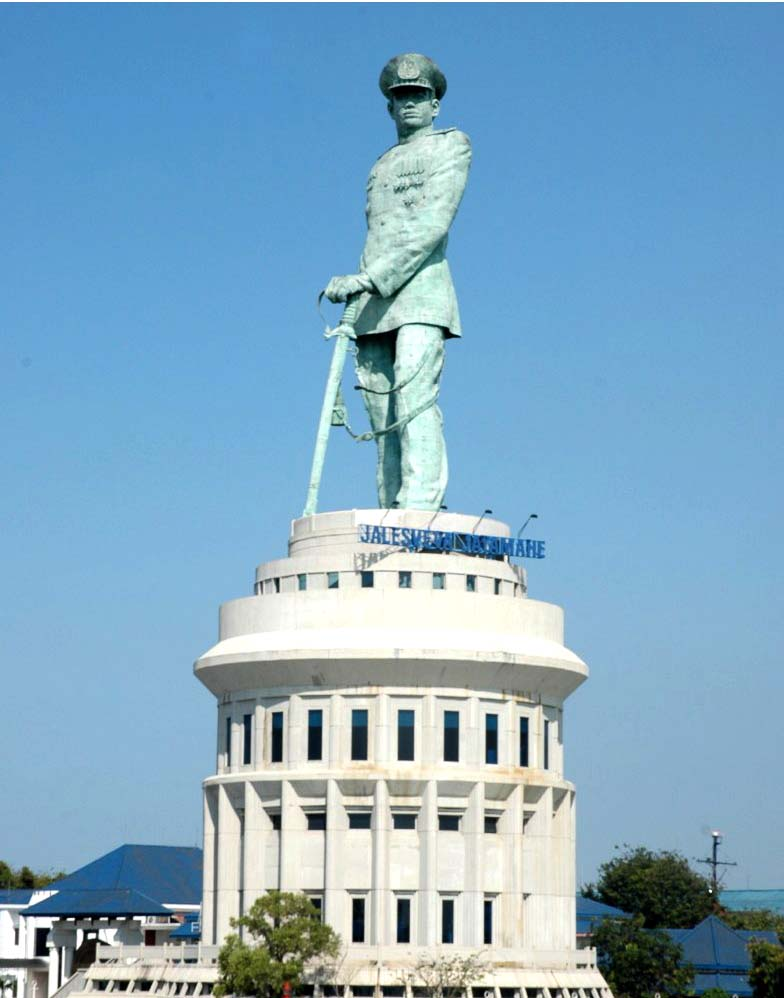
Jalesveva Jayamahe Monument, located at Surabaya, East Java in Indonesia.

The construction was started in 1993 by the Indonesian Chief of Navy, later continued by Indonesian National Force Admiral Muhammad Arifin, and designed by I Nyoman Nuarta. Other than a monument, this building also functions as a lighthouse for ships on the surrounding sea.

== Gallery ==
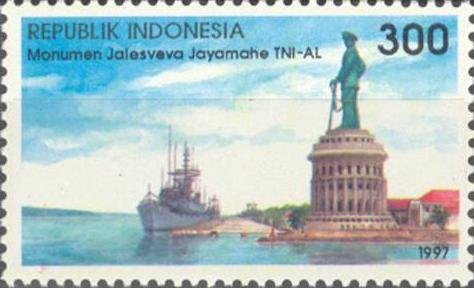
Jalesveva Jayamahe Monument on 1997 Indonesia Postage Stamp collection, in celebrating Indonesia National Armed Forces Day.
