= Buduruvagala =

Ancient Buddhist temple in Monaragala, Sri Lanka

Coordinates: 6°41′13″N 81°04′42″E

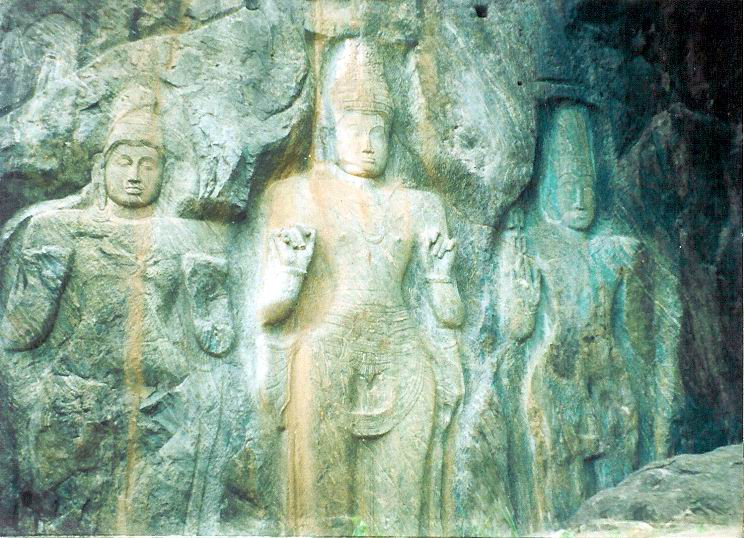
Three Buddha statues at Buduruvagala temple

Buduruwagala is an ancient Buddhist temple in Sri Lanka. The complex consists of seven statues and belongs to the Mahayana school of thought. The statues date back to the 10th century. The gigantic Buddha statue still bears traces of its original stuccoed robe and a long streak of orange suggests it was once brightly painted. The central of the three figures to the Buddha's right is thought to be the Bodhisattva Avalokiteśvara. To the left of this white painted figure is a female figure in the thrice-bent posture, which is thought to be his consort-Tara.

== Name ==
Buduruvagala means "the rock of Buddhist Sculptures". The name Buduruwagala is derived from the words for Buddha (Budu), images (ruva) and stone (gala). Most visitors, especially Buddhists, who attend the temple will make sure to visit Buduruvagala.

== Location ==
Buduruvagala is located about 4 miles (6.4 km) southeast of Wellawaya in Monaragala district, Sri Lanka.

== Size of the statues ==
The largest of the standing Buddha statues is 51 feet (16 m) from head to toe; is the largest standing Buddha statue of the island.

== History ==
Authorities generally date them to the 9th or 10th century. Buduruvagala does not have much historical records. Even its original name is unknown. It is thought to be a hermitage for monks. The sculptures of Buduruvagala also include many sculptures of Bodhisattva images including Mahayana tradition.

== The mustard oil lamp ==
On the same rock where the sculptures are carved, there is a carved shape of about 3 feet (0.91 m) wide and 4 feet (1.2 m) height. It is of the shape of a flame. The inside wall of this carved shape is always wet of an oil that smells very much like Mustard oil. This oil comes to the carved shape with no explainable source or reason.

== Gallery ==
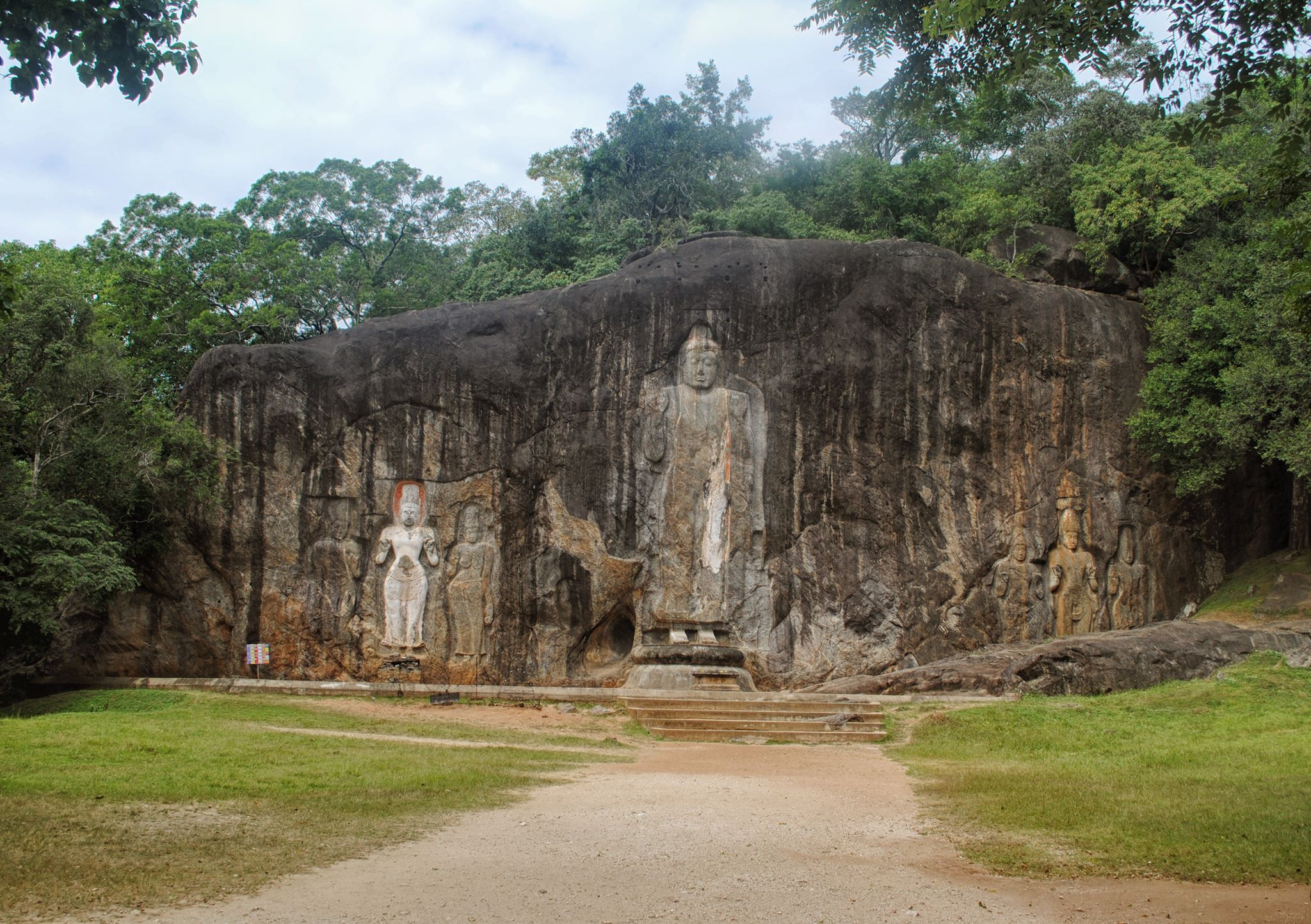
The figures are thought to date from around the 10th century and belong to the Mahayana Buddhist school, which enjoyed a brief heyday in Sri Lanka during this time.

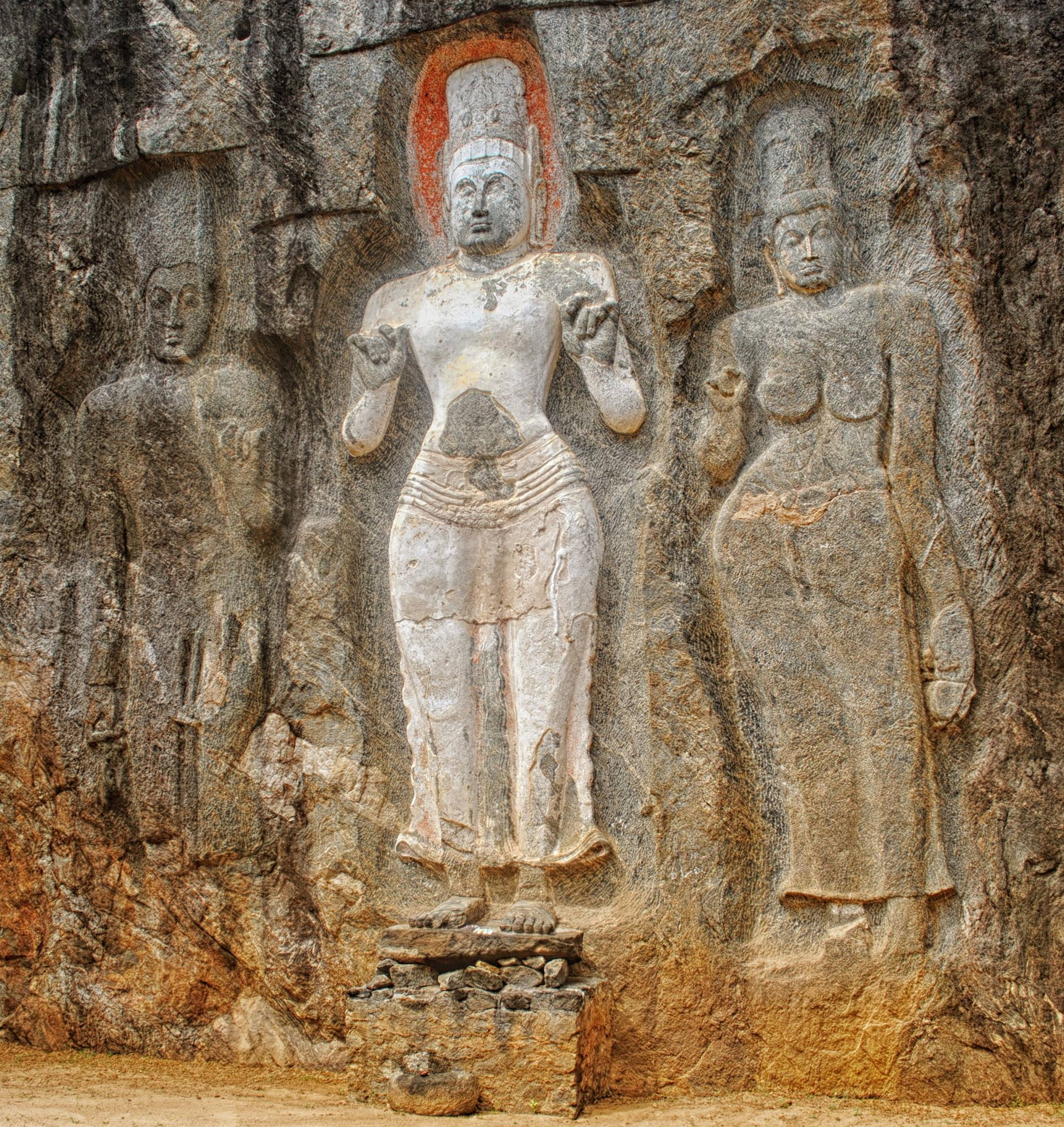
Avalokitesvara (the bodhisattva of compassion). To the left of this white-painted figure is a female figure thought to be his consort, Bodhisattva Tara. Local legend says the third figure represents Prince Sudhana.

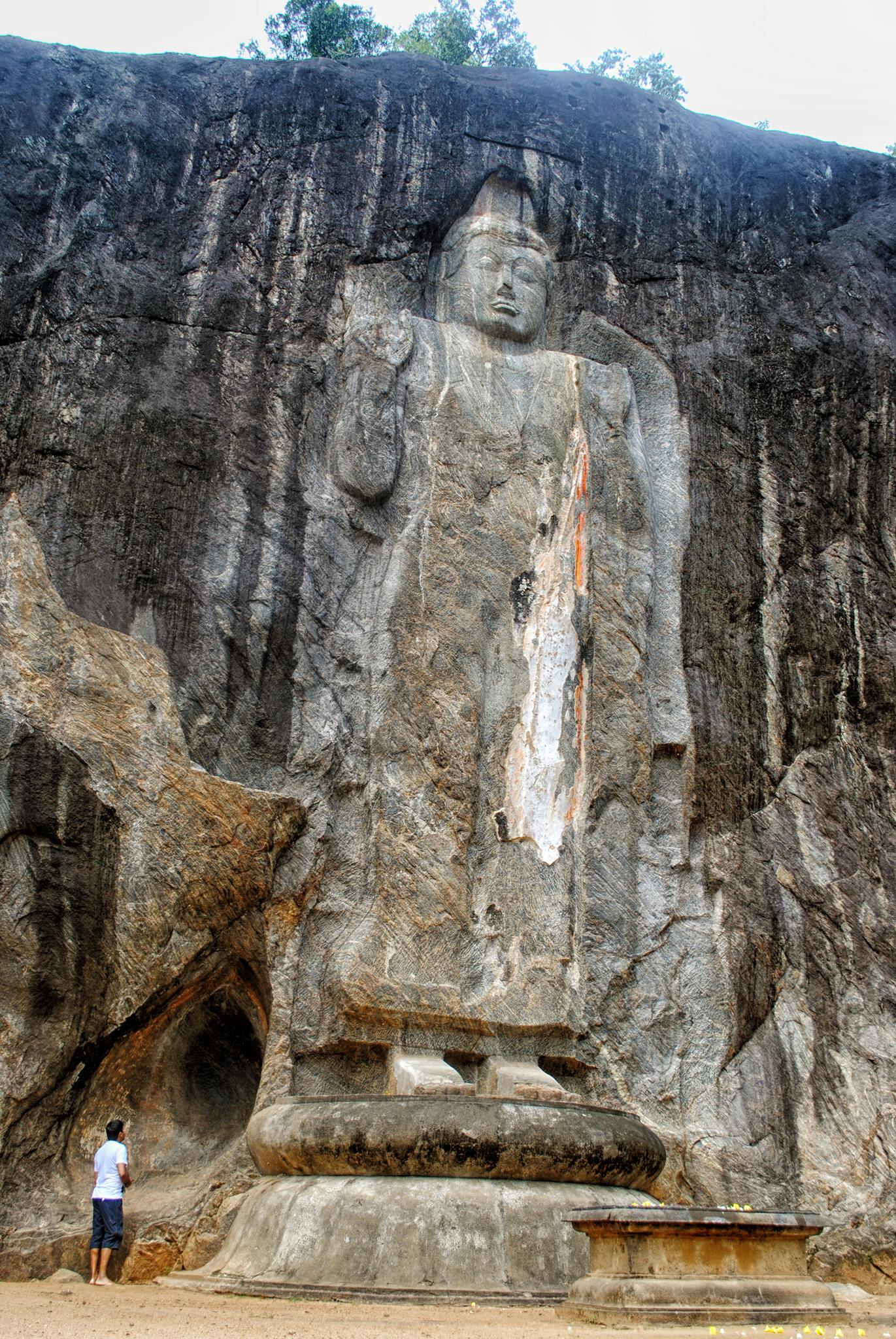
The gigantic standing Buddha – at 16m, it is the tallest on the island – in the centre still bears traces of its original stuccoed robe, and a long streak of orange suggests it was once brightly painted

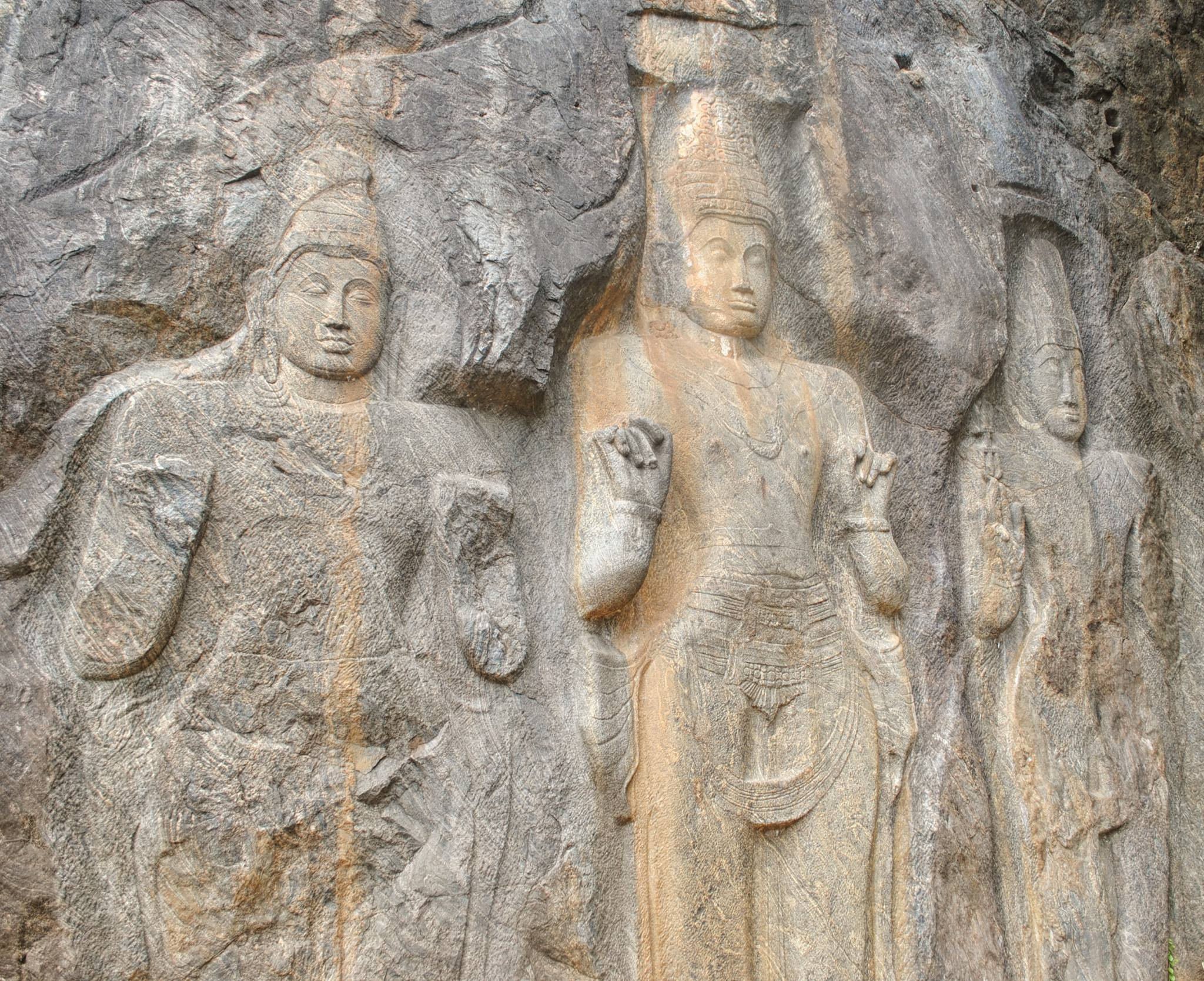
The crowned figure at the centre of the group is thought to be Maitreya, the future Buddha. To his left stands Vajrapani, who holds a vajra (an hourglass-shaped thunderbolt symbol) – an unusual example of the Tantric side of Buddhism in Sri Lanka. The figure to the left may be either Vishnu or Sahampath Brahma. Several of the figures hold up their right hands with two fingers bent down to the palm – a beckoning gesture.

== See also ==
- Buduruwagala Museum
- Maligawila Buddha statue
- Dematamal viharaya
- Yudaganawa
- Vajrayana
