= Garuda Wisnu Kencana Cultural Park =

Cultural site in Bali, Indonesia

- Taman Budaya Garuda Wisnu Kencana ᬢᬫᬦ᭄ᬩᬸᬤᬬᬕᬭᬸᬤᬯᬶᬱ᭄ᬡᬸᬓᭂᬜ᭄ᬘᬦ
- Garuda Plaza at GWK

- Location within Indonesia
- Location: Near Ngurah Rai International Airport
- Nearest town: Ungasan, Badung, Indonesia
- Coordinates: 8.81°S 115.168°E
- Area: 60 hectares (150 acres)
- Elevation: 263 metres (863 ft)
- Opened: 1989
- Administrator: Alam Sutera Group
- Open: 8:00am - 10:00 pm
- Website: https://www.gwkbali.com/

Garuda Wisnu Kencana Cultural Park (Indonesian: Taman Budaya Garuda Wisnu Kencana; Balinese script: ᬢᬫᬦ᭄ᬩᬸᬤᬬᬕᬭᬸᬤᬯᬶᬱ᭄ᬡᬸᬓᭂᬜ᭄ᬘᬦ), or GWK, is a tourist destination and attraction located at Ungasan, Badung on the island of Bali, Indonesia, about 10–15 minutes drive from Ngurah Rai International Airport. It is devoted to the Hindu god Vishnu, and his mount, Garuda, the mythical bird who became his companion.

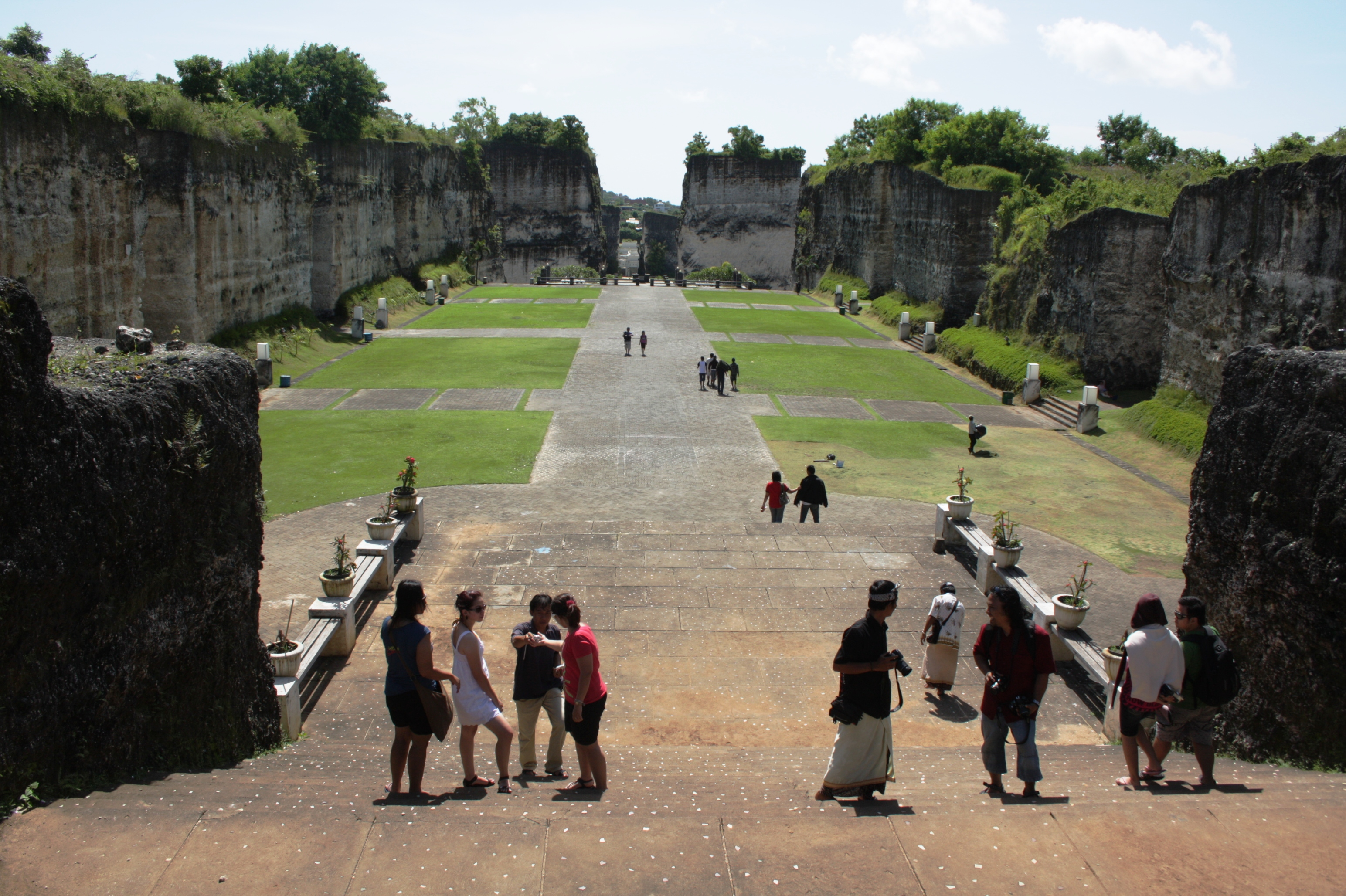
Lotus Pond, the core area of the Garuda Wisnu Kencana Cultural Park

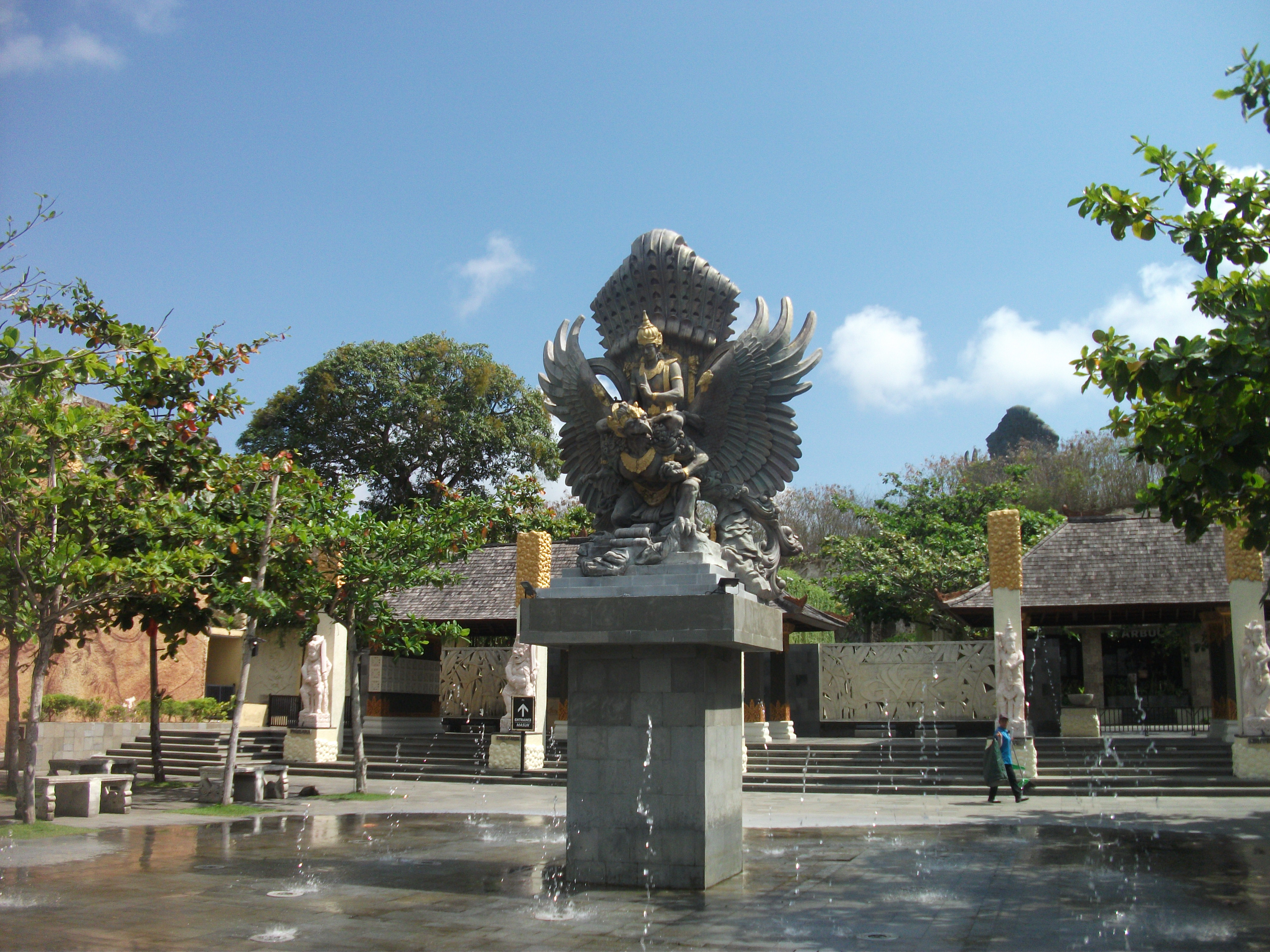
GWK statue miniature in the park

Owned and managed by Alam Sutera Realty, Tbk, the construction of the 120.9 m (397 ft) statue of Vishnu riding his mount Garuda was completed in August 2018. The park has a land area of about 60 hectares and is 263 m (863 ft) above sea level.

In the area, there is also the Garuda Statue. Directly behind Plaza Wisnu, the Garuda Plaza houses an 18-meter-tall statue of the Garuda head. Currently, Plaza Garuda serves as the focal point of a large corridor of carved limestone pillars spanning over 4,000 square meters of open space, known as Lotus Pond. The colossal and monumental limestone pillars of Lotus Pond create a truly exotic landscape. With a capacity of up to 7,000 people, Lotus Pond has earned a reputation as the perfect venue for large events, both national and international. The Garuda Wisnu Kencana statue was inaugurated on September 22, 2018, by President Joko Widodo.

== Garuda Wisnu Kencana statue ==
Designed to be Indonesia’s tallest statue, Garuda Wisnu Kencana was inspired by a story from Hindu mythology about the search for Amrita (the elixir of life). According to that, Garuda agreed to be ridden by Lord Visnu in return for the right to use the elixir to liberate his enslaved mother.

The idea for the monument was not without controversy, and religious authorities on the island complained that its massive size might disrupt the spiritual balance of the island, and that its commercial nature was inappropriate, but some groups approve of the project, because it will be a new tourist attraction on barren land.

The 75 m (246 ft) tall, 65 m (213 ft) wide statue was designed by Nyoman Nuarta. It sits atop a pedestal to bring the total height of the monument to 121 m (397 ft), which is nearly 30 m (98 ft) taller than the Statue of Liberty in the United States. The completed monument is about as tall as a 21-storey building. It weighs 4000 tonnes, making it the heaviest statue in the country. The statue is made of copper and brass sheeting, with a stainless steel frame and skeleton, as well as a steel and concrete core column. The outer covering measures 22,000 m^{2} (240,000 sq ft) in area. The crown of Visnu is covered with golden mosaics and the statue has a dedicated lighting arrangement. The monument was completed on 31 July 2018 and inaugurated by Indonesian President Joko Widodo on 22 September 2018.

== Multi role site ==
The site has hosted some large-scale and international events.

- On 20 February 2011, British heavy metal band Iron Maiden played the first rock concert at the venue in the Final Frontier Tour with tickets sold out to over 7,000 fans.
- On 17 August 2011, American rock band Paramore played the second date of their Pacific Rim Tour at the venue. This was also their last tour in 2011.
- On 25 July 2012, the Opening Banquet of the 60th World Convention of the Full Gospel Business Men's Fellowship International.
- On 7, 8 and 9 December 2018, Djakarta Warehouse Project (DWP), the largest annual music festival of Electronic Dance Music in Asia, was held here, including a set by Canadian singer-songwriter the Weeknd. To celebrate its 10-year anniversary, DWP ventured away—for the first time—from their usual city, Jakarta, and took the event to Bali.
- On 14 November 2022, during the G20 Bali summit, President Joko Widodo hosted the leaders of the G20 at the park's Lotus Pond area for the welcoming cultural dinner.

== Gallery ==
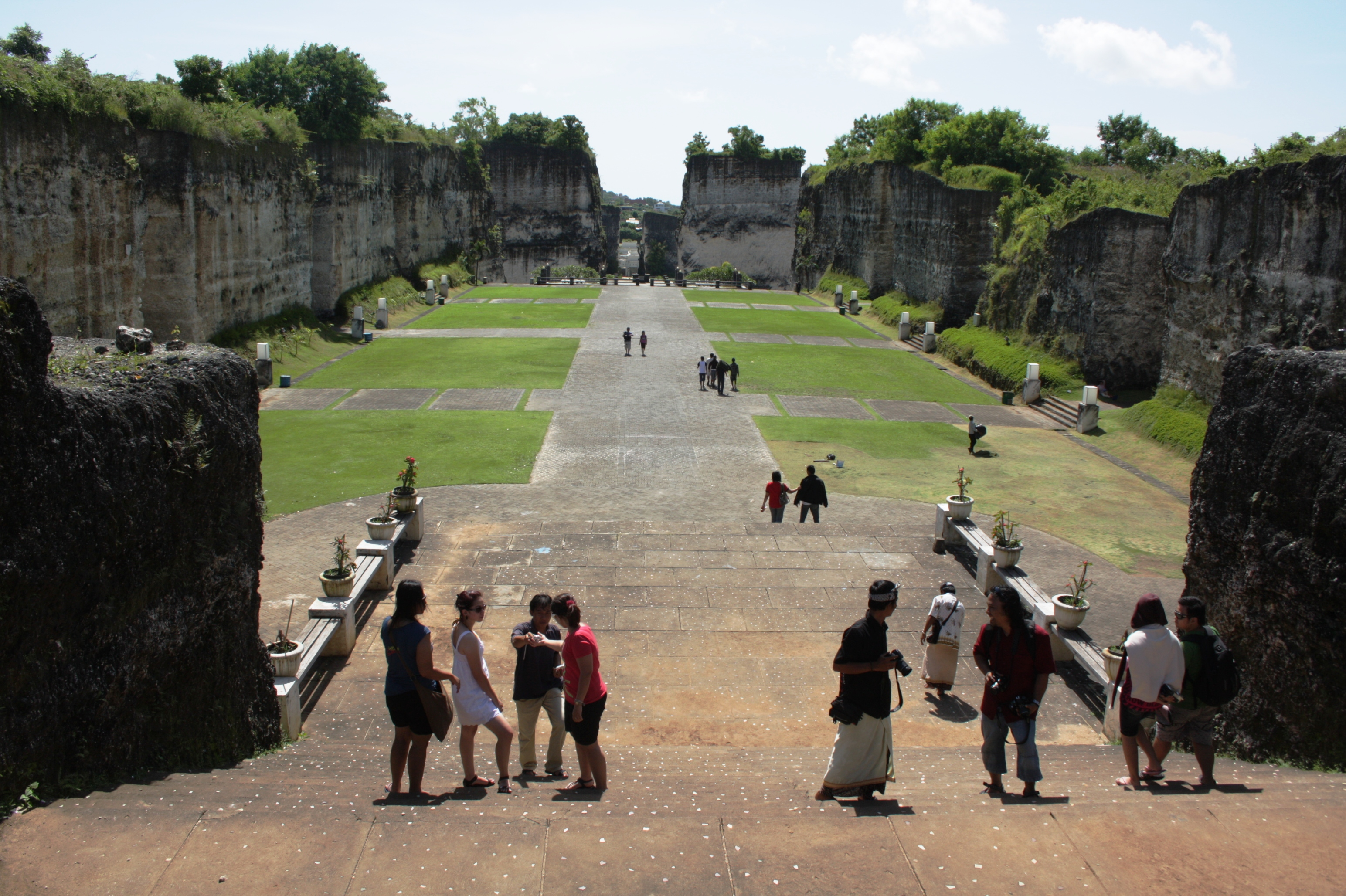
Lotus Pond, the core area of the Garuda Wisnu Kencana Cultural Park

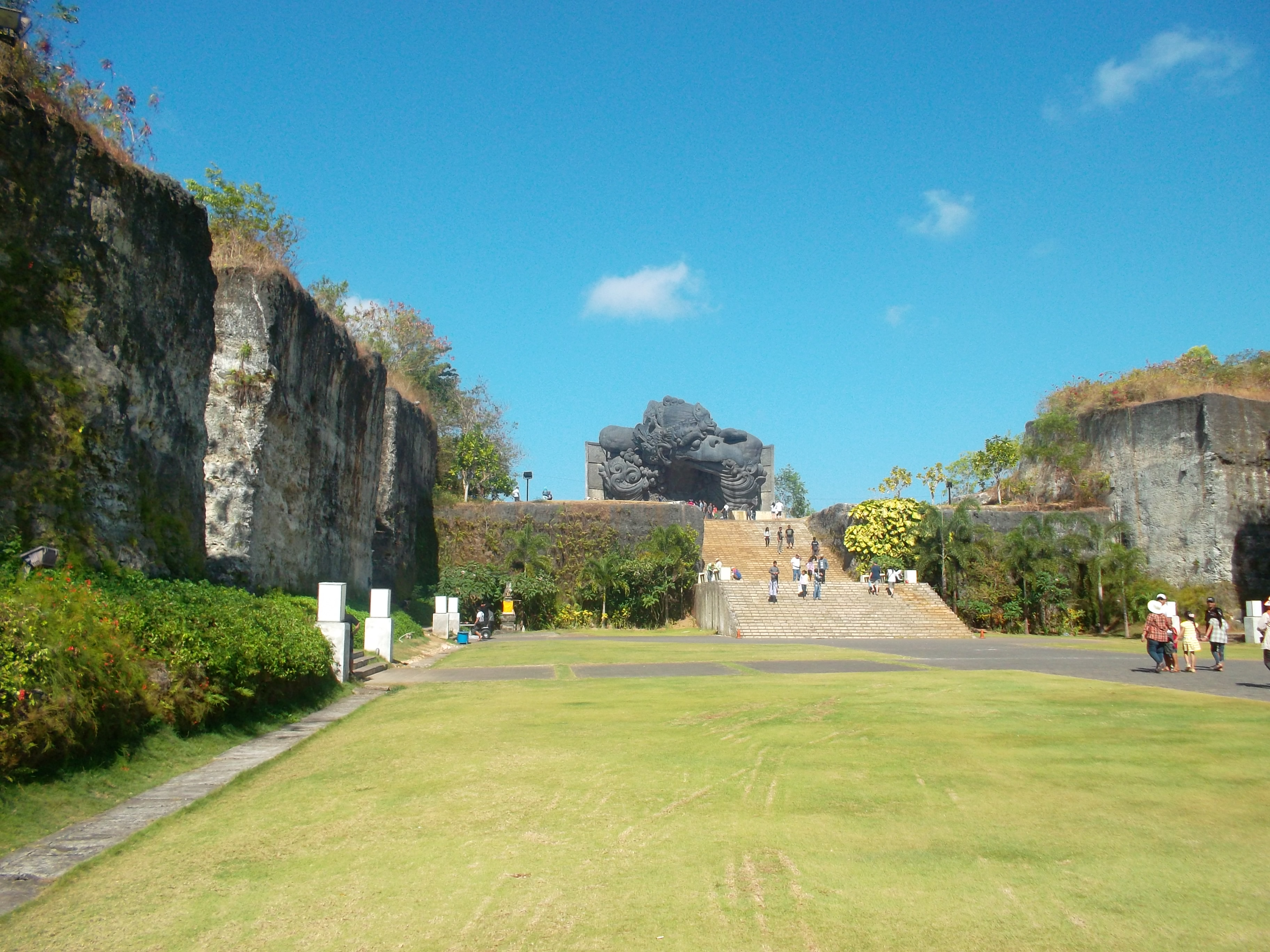
The Garuda statue seen from the Lotus Pond area

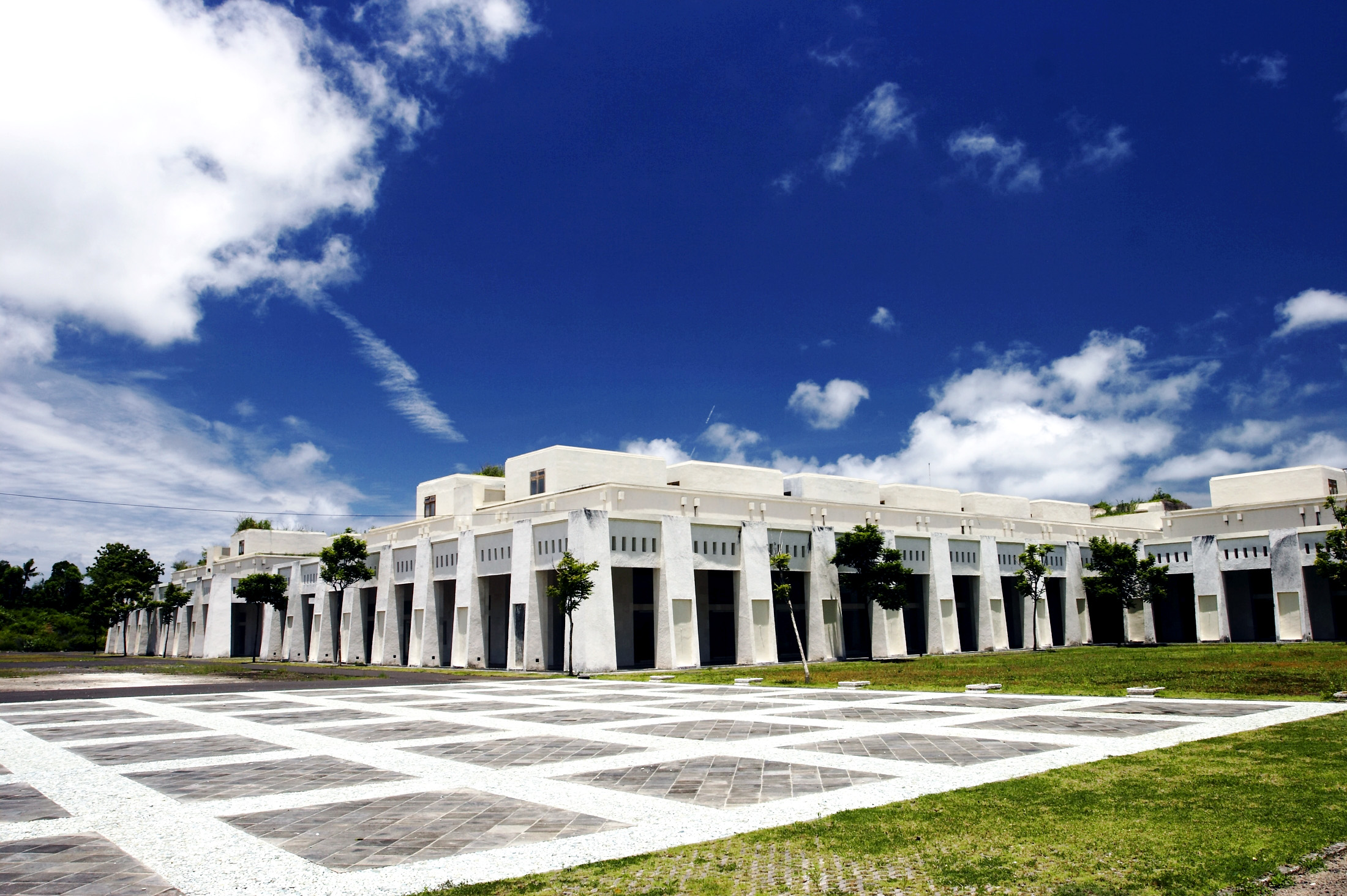
Shopping complex outside the statue complex

== See also ==
- List of national parks
- List of tallest statues
