= Badulla Preaching Buddha =

- Year: c. 6th century AD (Anuradhapura period)
- Type: sculpture
- Medium: hollow cast bronze
- Dimensions: 54.5 cm (21.5 in)
- Location: Colombo National Museum, Colombo

Badulla Bronze Buddha is a Buddha statue belonging to Sri Lanka’s Anuradhapura period. The sculpture, found in the Badulla, Sri Lanka was created around 6th century AD. This statue is made of hollow cast bronze. Currently displayed at Colombo National Museum, this statue is 54.5 cm high.

== Statue ==
Buddha, in Virasana posture depicts vitarka mudra in right hand. The statue represents Buddha in a preaching moment. The left hand of Buddha is depicted with kataka hasta mudra while holding the robe.

The usnisha, a common feature of Anuradhapura period Buddha statues, is fairly seen. When found, the Buddha was in a damaged condition.
