= Rue de l'Abbaye =

Street in Paris, France

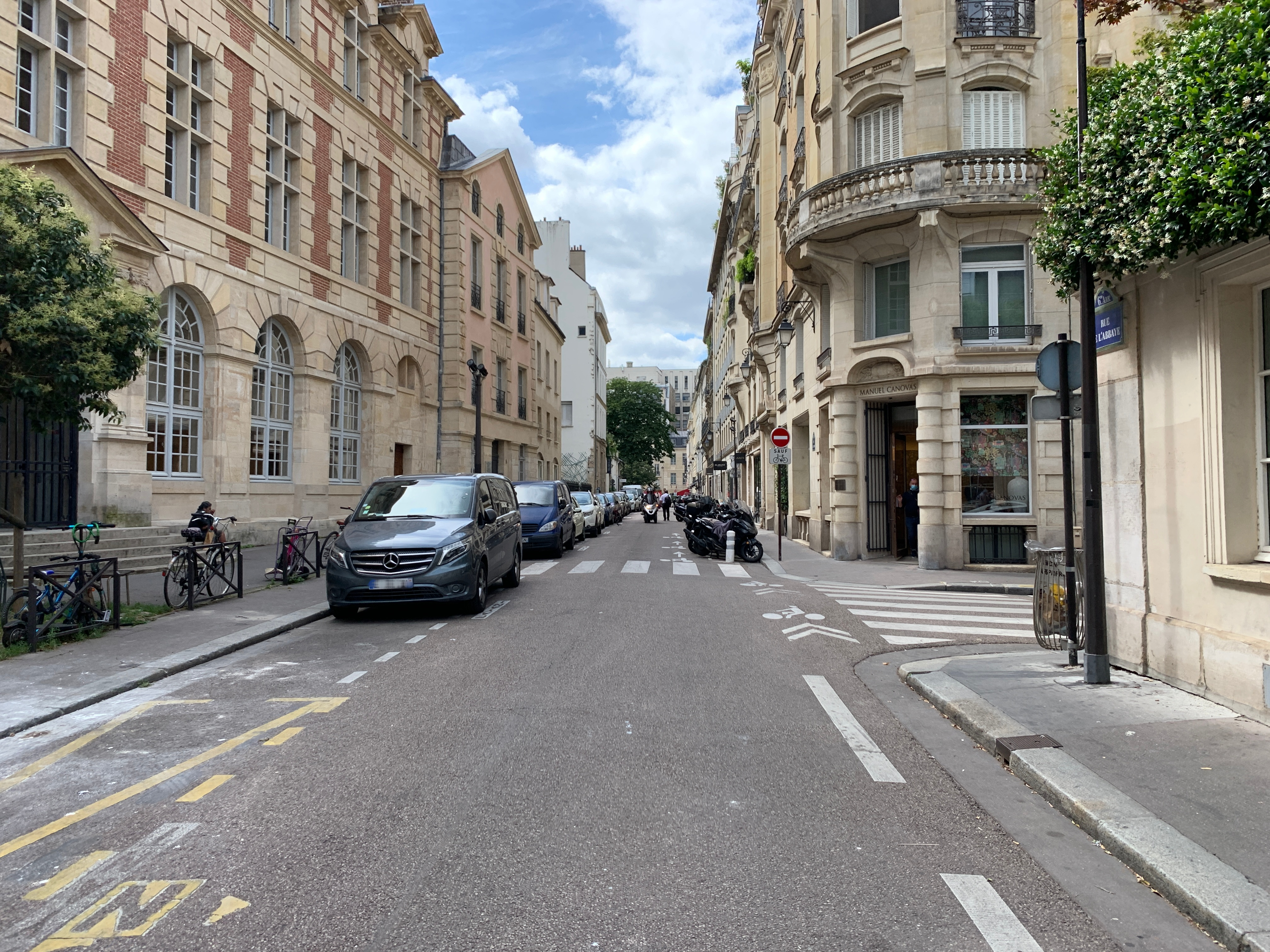

- Location within Paris
- Length: 180 m (590 ft)
- Width: 7.80 m (25.6 ft) between rue de l'Echaudé and rue Cardinale; 9.74 m for the remaining
- Arrondissement: 6th
- Quarter: Saint-Germain-des-Prés
- Coordinates: 48°51′15.2″N 2°20′5″E
- From: 18 rue de l'Echaudé
- To: 1 place Saint-Germain des Prés and 37 rue Bonaparte

Construction
- Completion: c. 18th century

The Rue de l'Abbaye is a residential street in the 6th arrondissement of Paris, named after the Abbey of Saint-Germain-des-Prés. It has a length of some 170 m and runs from the Rue Guillaume Apollinaire to the Rue de l'Echaudé. The street itself dates from 1800, although the land it runs over has a much longer history. The oldest and most prominent buildings on the street are the abbey's side entrance and former abbot's residence, built in 1586. It now is the home of the Catholic Institute of France.

== Transportation ==
The area is served by the following stations of the Paris Métro:

- Saint-Germain-des-Prés (approx. 90 m from the westernmost end of the street)
- Mabillon (approx. 100 m from the easternmost end of the street).

== History ==
The Benedictine abbey was founded by Childebert, son of Clovis, in 543 to house relics brought from the Siege of Zaragoza the previous year. These included the tunic of Saint-Vincent and a cross of gold from Toledo; in consequence, the church and abbey were originally known as Saint-Vincent and Sainte-Croix. The church was founded somewhat later in 557 by Germain, Bishop of Paris, who was buried there in 576. A small market town grew up around the religious centre which became a place of pilgrimage and whose name changed to Saint-Germain-des-Prés ("of the meadows") in the 9th century. The Merovingian kings of France were also buried here — the tombs all disappearing during the French Revolution.

Around 1000, a new Romanesque church with three bell towers was built. Two of these were knocked down in 1821 due to their state of decomposition from the saltpetre in the gunpowder stored there during the French Revolution. The third bell tower still remains.

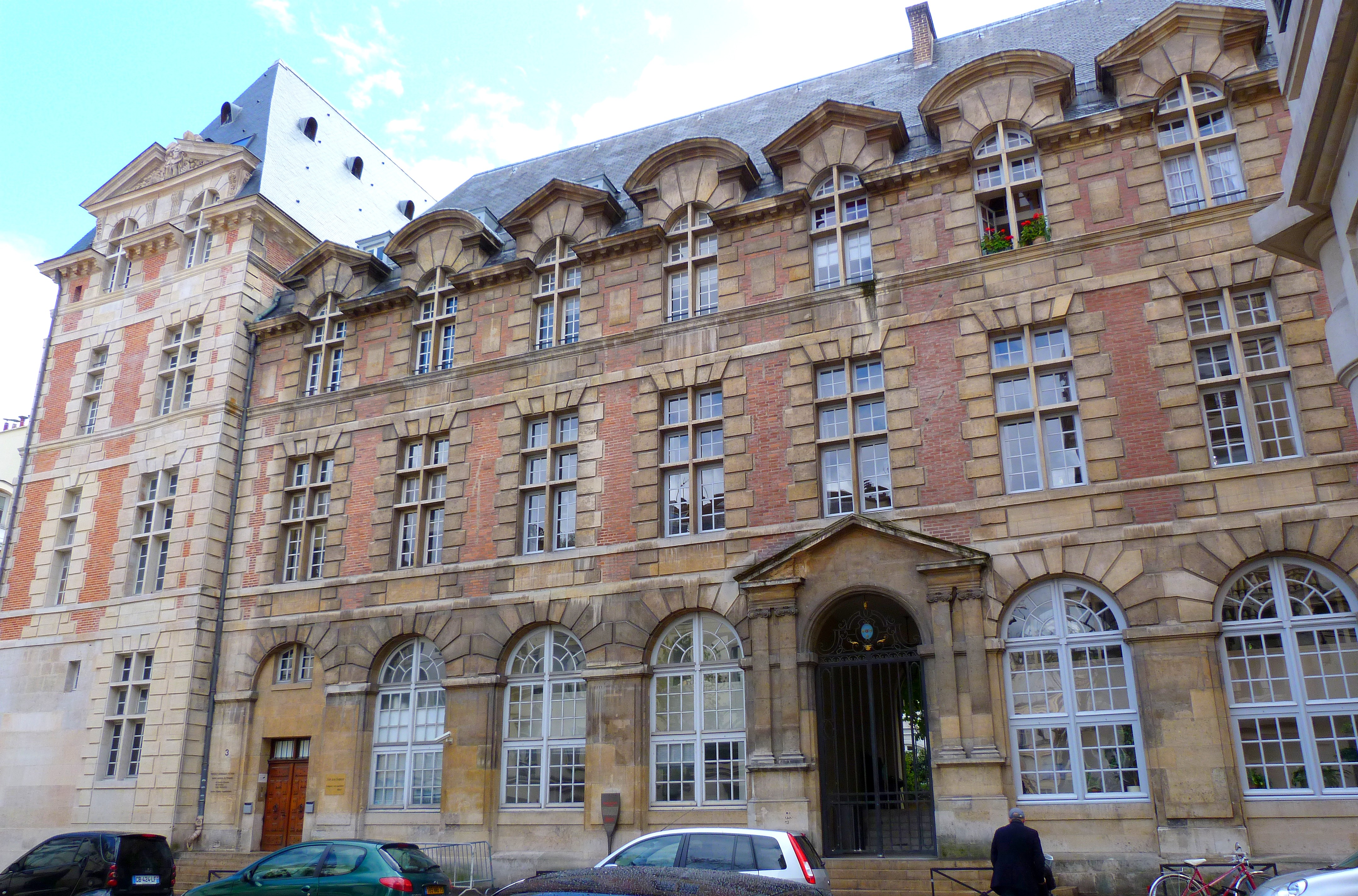
Abbot's Palace (1586), now Catholic Institute of France

The Abbot's Palace (Palais abbatial), commissioned by Charles de Bourbon in 1586, is still occupied (nos. 1–5). The abbot's garden also exists to this day and was the scene of one of the most sombre episodes of the French Revolution, the September Massacres of the 2 to 5 September 1792.

The street was built in 1800 by driving a way through the abbey grounds which had been taken over by the new Republic. The old refectory and part of the chapel were destroyed in the creation of the street, which was initially known as the Rue de la Paix, became the Rue Neuve de l'Abbaye in 1809 and settled on its current name in 1815. As recently as 1951, that portion of the original street between the Rue Bonaparte and the Rue Saint-Benoît was renamed the Rue Guillaume Apollinaire after the poet Guillaume Apollinaire.

== Composition ==
- The Abbot's Palace was built by Charles de Bourbon in 1586. It is the second building in Paris built of brick and stone. It now belongs to the Catholic Institut of Paris. This building has also, over the years, housed a number of well-known artists, such as Jean Francois Gigoux, and Jean-Jacques Pradier.
- The tomb of René Descartes is currently in the church of Saint Germain-des-Prés.
- The building at 4-6 rue de l'Abbaye, in the Art Nouveau style by architect Charles Labro, was selected as one of the six best new facades in Paris in 1901, in the Competition of facades of the City of Paris, an honor also received that year by Jules Lavirotte and in 1898 by Hector Guimard.
- Le Petit Zinc café is on the corner of the Rue Saint-Benoit and what was the Rue de l'Abbaye (now the Rue Guillaume Apollinaire). Its facade is a notable example of the Art Nouveau Guimard style, named from the architect Hector Guimard, which can also be seen in the sixty or so Métro entrances he designed.
- The Square Laurent-Prache was opened to the public in 1901. It was created on that part of the ruins of the abbey where the house of Alphonse Daudet had stood.
- A head of Dora Maar by Pablo Picasso, (started in 1918 and completed in 1941), as a memorial to his recently deceased friend Guillaume Apollinaire was installed in the Square Laurent-Prache on June 5, 1959, and has now been returned after a short sojourn in front of the Mairie d'Osny in the Val-de-Oise department. This statue was stolen during the night of 30–31 March 1999, resurfacing a month later as an 'objet d'art' at the Hôtel de Ville in Osny.
