= Sona =

Sona may refer to:

== Places ==
- Sona, Veneto, a comune in the province of Verona in Italy
- Soná District, Veraguas, a district within the province of Veraguas, situated in Panama
  - Soná, Panama, a town in Soná District, Veraguas, Panama.
- Șona, a commune located in Alba County, Romania.
- Sona Glacier, a Himalayan glacier situated in the Pithoragarh district in the eastern part of Uttarakhand, India
- Sona, Norway, a village in the municipality of Stjørdal in Trøndelag county, Norway
  - Sona Station, a railway station on the Meråker Line in the village of Sona
- Sona Mosque, a mosque in Chapai Nawabganj district of Bangladesh
- Sone River or Sona, second-largest tributary of Ganga river in India

== Organizations ==
- Society of Nepali Architects

== Persons ==
- Sona (given name), a list of people with this name
- Sona (singer) (born 1973), Armenian singer

== Film and television ==
- Sona Chandi, a comedy-drama television serial produced by Pakistan Television Corporation
- Sona Spa, a 2013 Indian Hindi-language drama film
- Kaala Sona (lit. 'Black Gold'), a 1975 Indian Hindi-language action thriller film
- Chandi Sona (lit. 'Silver and Gold'), a 1977 Indian Hindi-language film
- "Sona", episode 22 of season 2 of Prison Break

== Music ==
- SonaBLAST! Records, a Louisville, Kentucky-based record label
- SONA (band), Neo-Pagan folk rock American music band
- Sona Family, London-based musical quartet

== Others ==
- Lusona (plural sona), African ideographic tradition
- Sona language (artificial), worldlang created by Kenneth Searight and described in a book he published in 1935
- Sona language (Papua New Guinea), Kanasi language of Papua New Guinea
- Sona Masuri, medium-grain rice grown largely in the Indian states of Andhra Pradesh and Karnataka
- Sona (restaurant), defunct Michelin-starred French restaurant in West Hollywood, California
- State of the Nation (disambiguation)
- A custom digital avatar, shortening of persona
  - Fursona
  - Ponysona

== See also ==
- Son (disambiguation)
- Shona (disambiguation)
