= Sone (disambiguation) =

The sone is a unit of loudness.

Sone may also refer to:

- Sone (surname) (曽根), a Japanese surname
- Sone Station (disambiguation)
- Sone River, also Son or Sonbhadra, a tributary of the Ganges in India
- a Fandom name for Girls' Generation
- Supporters Of Nuclear Energy, a nuclear energy advocacy group

== See also ==
- Sones (disambiguation)
- Son (disambiguation)
