= Westlake Square =

Park in Seattle, Washington, United States

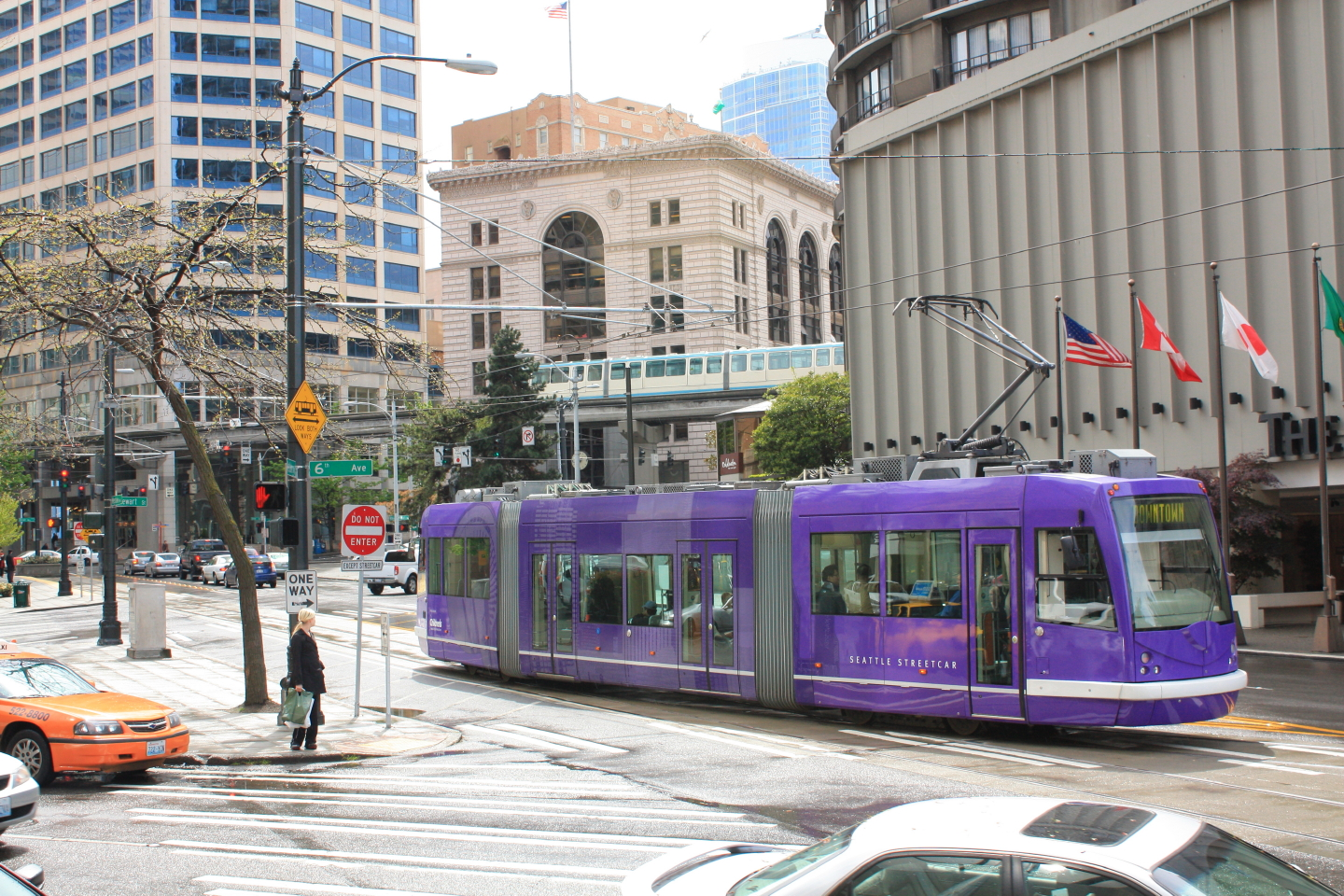
- Pedestrian in Westlake Square watching South Lake Union Streetcar in 2010
- Interactive map of Westlake Square
- Location: Seattle, Washington; Bounded by Westlake, 6th and Stewart
- Coordinates: 47.6136°N 122.3373°W
- Area: 0.01-acre (40 m^{2})
- Created: 1917 (as streetcar stop)
- Operator: Seattle Parks and Recreation

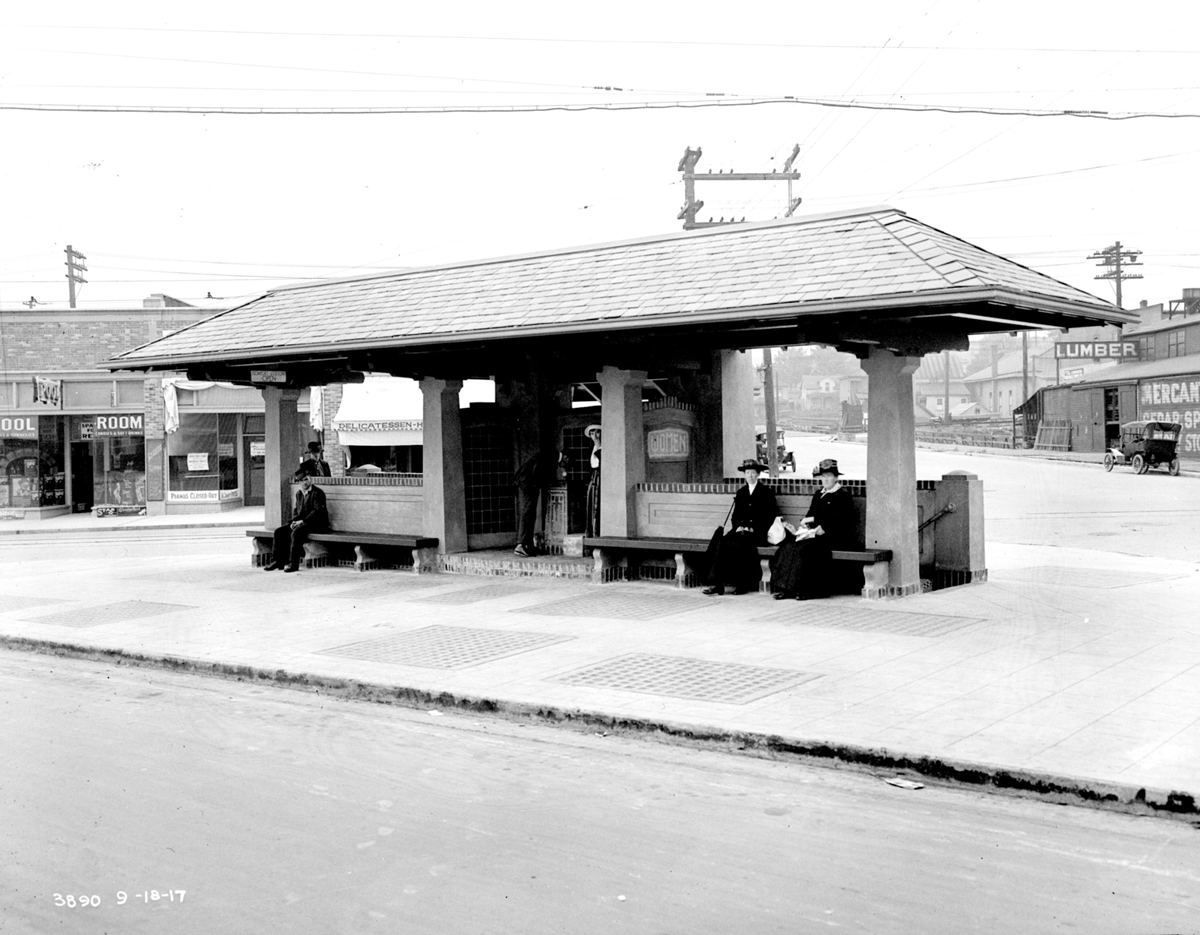
Ground-level view of Westlake Square streetcar stop as it appeared when built in 1917

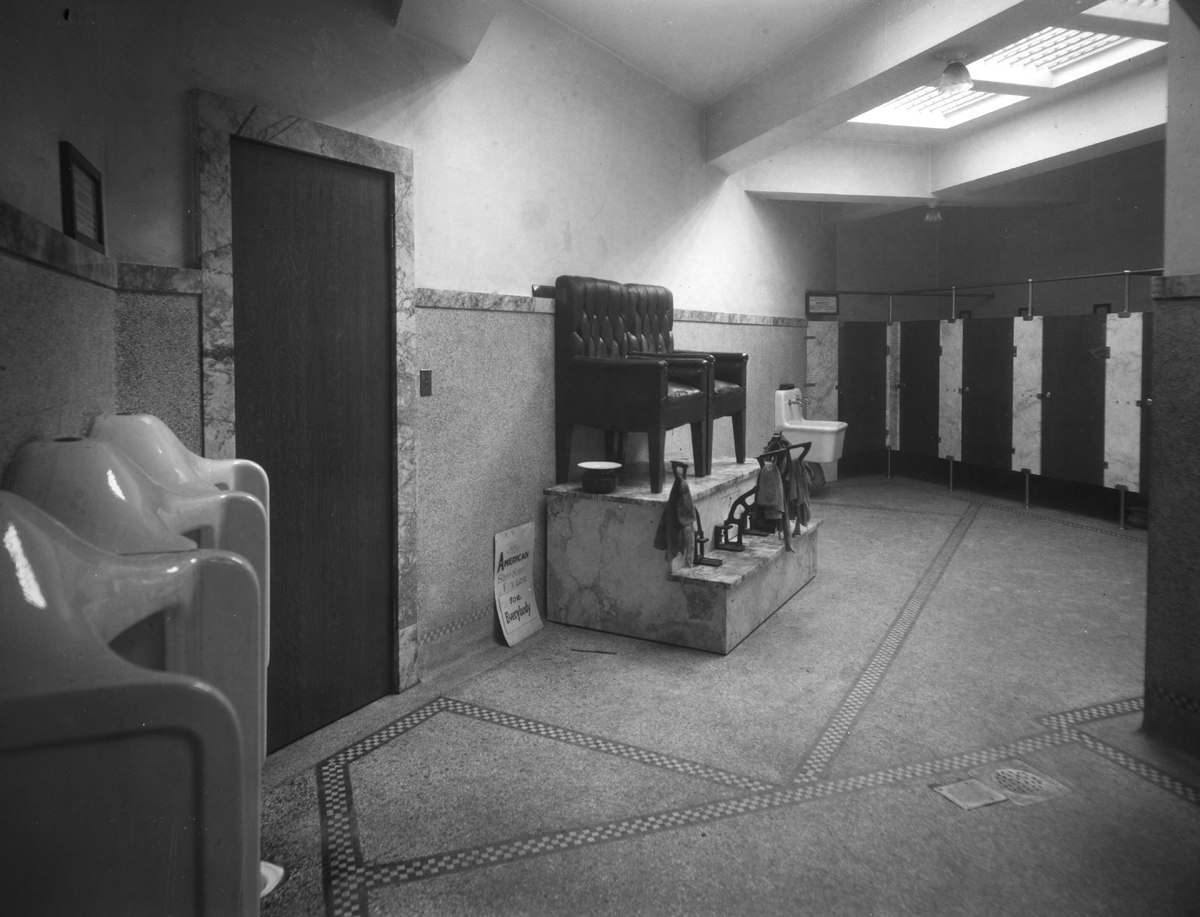
Underground comfort station interior in 1917

Westlake Square is a 0.01-acre (0.0040 ha) park in Seattle, Washington, adjacent to Westin Seattle. It was formerly a combination streetcar stop and underground comfort station. The former comfort station was demolished and filled in 1964.

In 2010, Seattle Department of Transportation redeveloped Westlake Square and adjacent McGraw Square into a new plaza for the South Lake Union Streetcar. A bronze statue of Swami Vivekananda by Indian artist Naresh Kumar Kumawat was installed at Westlake Square in April 2026. Mayor Katie Wilson and representatives of the Indian Consulate attended the dedication ceremony. It is the first life-size statue of Vivekananda in the U.S.

== See also ==
- Westlake Park, a larger park nearby
- Westlake Station, in the nearby underground transit tunnel
- McGraw Square, a plaza located one block south on Westlake Avenue
