= Architecture of Nepal =

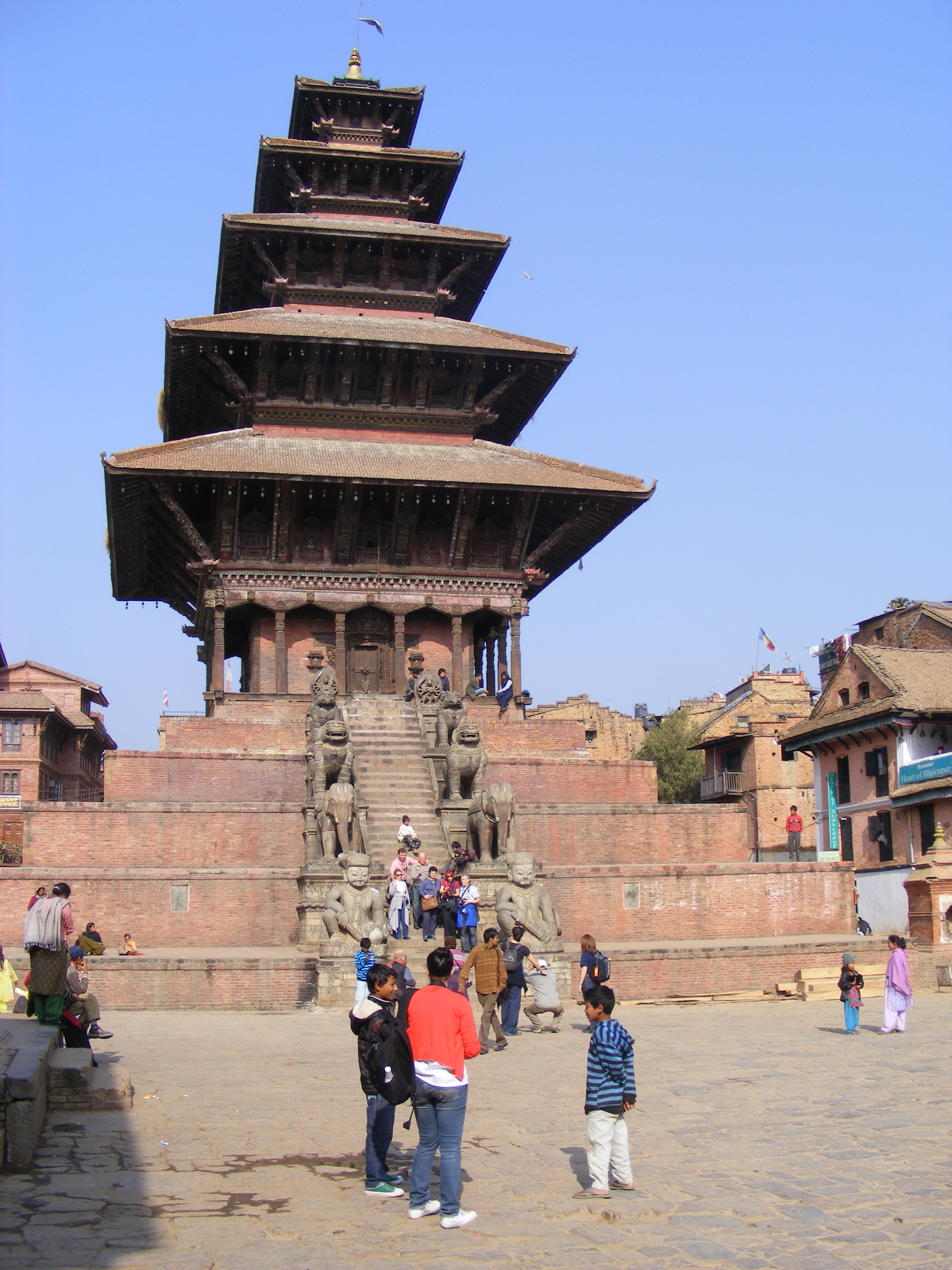
Nyatapola Temple located in Bhaktapur, Nepal, built in 1701–1702 CE

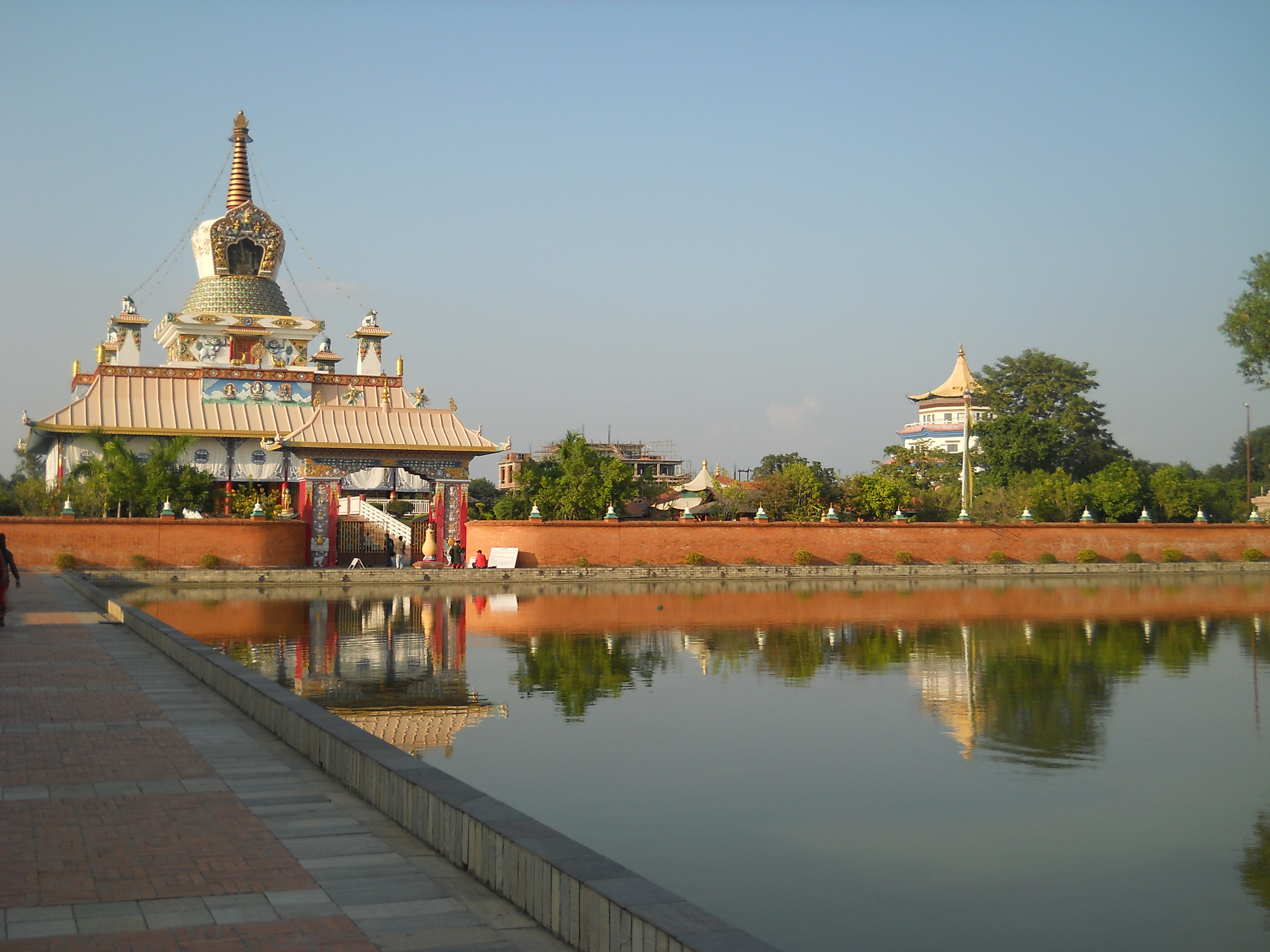
The Great Drigung Kagyud Lotus Stupa in Lumbini, Nepal

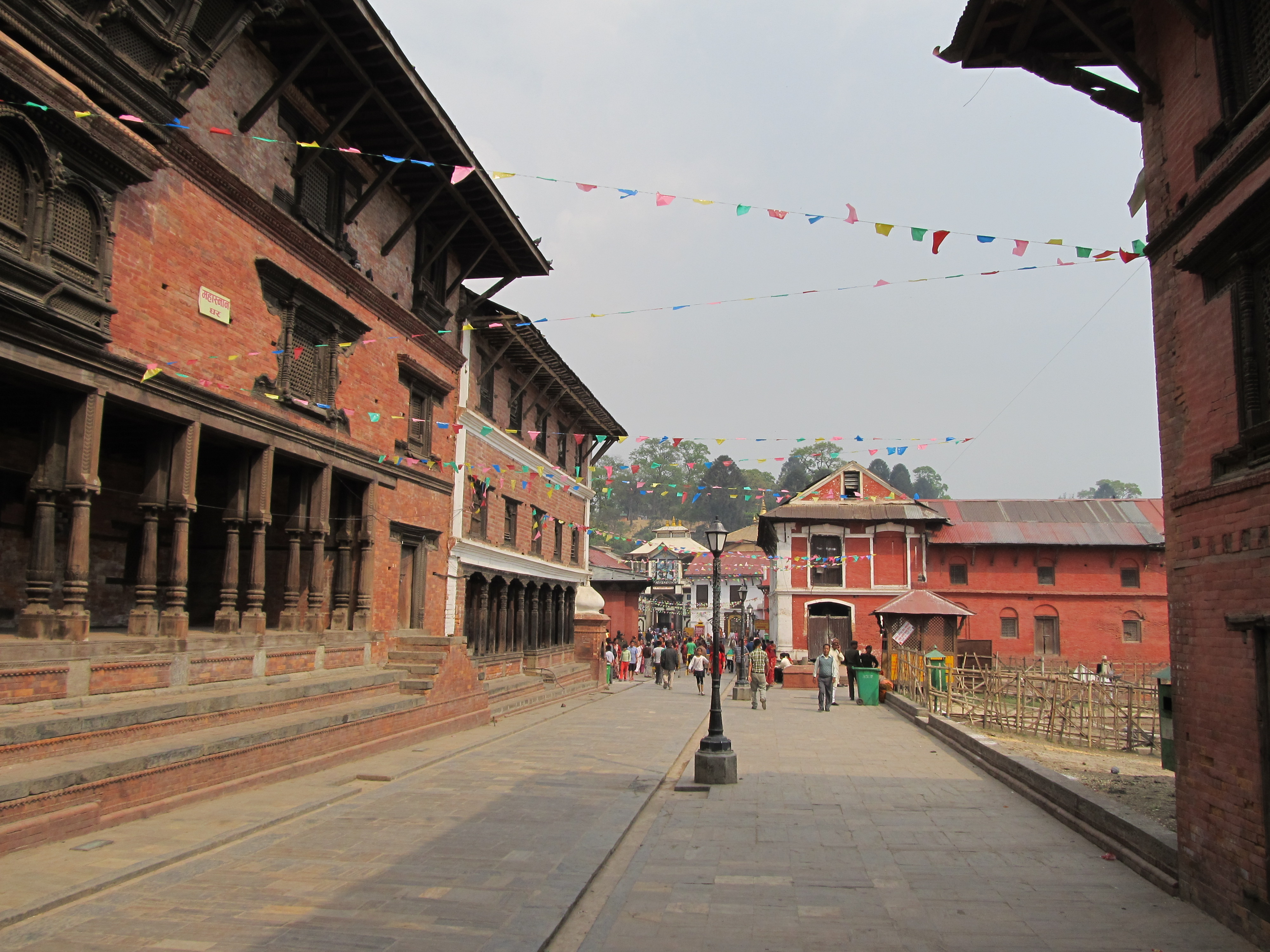
Traditional architecture of Kathmandu

Nepali architecture or Nepalese architecture is influenced by the architecture of India, Tibet and China. The pagoda architectural tradition figures prominently among Hindu temples in the country. In contrast, Buddhist temples reflect the Tibetan tradition of Buddhist architecture and the stupa features prominently. Mugal, summit and dome styles also have great scope in Nepal. Whilst significant influence for Nepal's architecture comes from India, there is also a distinct influence from the Newar people.

== Nepal's architectural history ==
Nepal has a variety of distinctive architectural features which are represented in residential, religious and public buildings. Much of Nepal’s architectural history is aligned with the dynasties that ruled at a particular time. Global industrialisation, which occurred between the 18th and 19th centuries, transformed most of the world’s construction. However, Nepal followed a different architectural trajectory.

Some accounts of Nepalese history are told through myth, the earliest of which can be dated back to 1558. One myth describes the architectural development of Kathmandu: There was a lake in Kathmandu and originally, people lived on the higher areas surrounding it. One day a ‘lotus-borne’ fire began on the lake’s surface and Bodhisattva Manjushri (an individual on the path to enlightenment) used his sword to disperse the water from the lake. From this point onwards, people descended into the valley and built their residences there. It is believed that these structures still remain and that this mythical site is now modern-day Kathmandu.

=== Licchavi Dynasty ===
One of the earliest recorded dynasties to hold power in Nepal was the Licchavi kingdom which ruled between the 5th and 7th centuries. During this time, temples such as the Shaiva of Pashupati at Deopatan, the Vaishnav temple of Changu Narayan and the Buddhist stupa of Swayambhu were erected. From the period of Licchavi rule, no buildings remain but there are many surviving sculptures.

=== Shah Dynasty ===
From 1786 onwards, Nepal entered its ‘modern era’. In the 18th century, important buildings that remain today were erected such as the Kasthamandap. In 1816, the Shah kingdom ruled and the country's architecture was heavily influenced by the Newar style. During the Shah reign, various temples, fountains and other important buildings were constructed.

=== Rana Dynasty ===
From 1846 to 1951 the Rana dynasty ruled, which saw both art and architecture of Nepal become heavily influenced by popular architectural trends in Europe. Significant tax revenue from this period went towards building stucco palaces. Prominent mansions in Kathmandu were adorned with marble tables, bronze figurines and chandeliers. Some of the buildings commissioned during this period have now been converted into hotels and government buildings. Also during the Rana dynasty (in 1848) luxurious palaces were commissioned, some of which remain to this day. Another notable architectural development during this time was the construction of the three Newar pagoda temples.

=== 20th century and contemporary period ===
Between the end of the Rana dynasty and the restoration of democracy in 1990, Nepal’s architecture became significantly more modern. In 1955, the Tribhuvan International Airport was opened and in 1969 there was an official city plan prepared for Kathmandu. In addition, large scale roads were built to create a connection between Nepal and the outside world, and massive concrete structures were built throughout the country.

== Architectural ensemble ==
The architectural ensemble of Nepal is a motley assembly of the following general structures. Each type is unique and distinctive in character and utility. However, most structures share some common techniques and styles:

- Dhunge dhara
- Pagoda
- Stupa
- Chaitya
- Jahru
- Palaces
- Monasteries
- Temples
- Residential houses
- Rest houses

== Residential architecture ==
Throughout different points in history, there were different types of residences in Nepal. The residential or ‘vernacular’ architecture of Nepal is vivid and contains varied styles, materials and patterns. Most of Nepal’s architecture is vernacular housing and materials used for these residences are sourced locally, including wood, brick, stone and sometimes earth. In the past, it was common for residences in Nepal to have lavish woodcarvings on windows and balconies. In recent decades, governments have pushed for the introduction of more ‘contemporary’ residential structures in Nepal - made primarily of concrete and metal. However, Nepal’s climate and terrain makes the viability of these modern materials poor and they are very costly for Nepali people.

The different types of Nepalese residences typical for each time period can be seen below.

| Type of Residential Structure | Period and Dynasty | Materials and Common Features |
| Early Newari homes | 300 CE - 879 CE (Licchavi dynasty) | Stone residences featured ‘decorative motifs’ which were influenced by Indian architecture. |
| Malla-period Newari homes | 1200 CE - 1769 CE (Malla dynasty) | Brick, tile and wood and residences featured pitched roofs and balconies. There was influence from Tibetan and Burmese architecture. |
| Shah-period homes | 1769 CE - 1846 CE (Shah dynasty) | Malla style architecture continued. There was influence from Mughal architecture from India. |
| Rana homes and buildings | 1846 CE - 1951 CE (Rana dynasty) | Introduction of the neo-classical and industrial style of architecture. Residences featured French windows and more modern materials such as plaster. |
| Modern Nepali homes | 1951 CE to present | Concrete and bricks residences - often townhouses and apartments. A Western influence can be seen. |

=== Newar houses ===
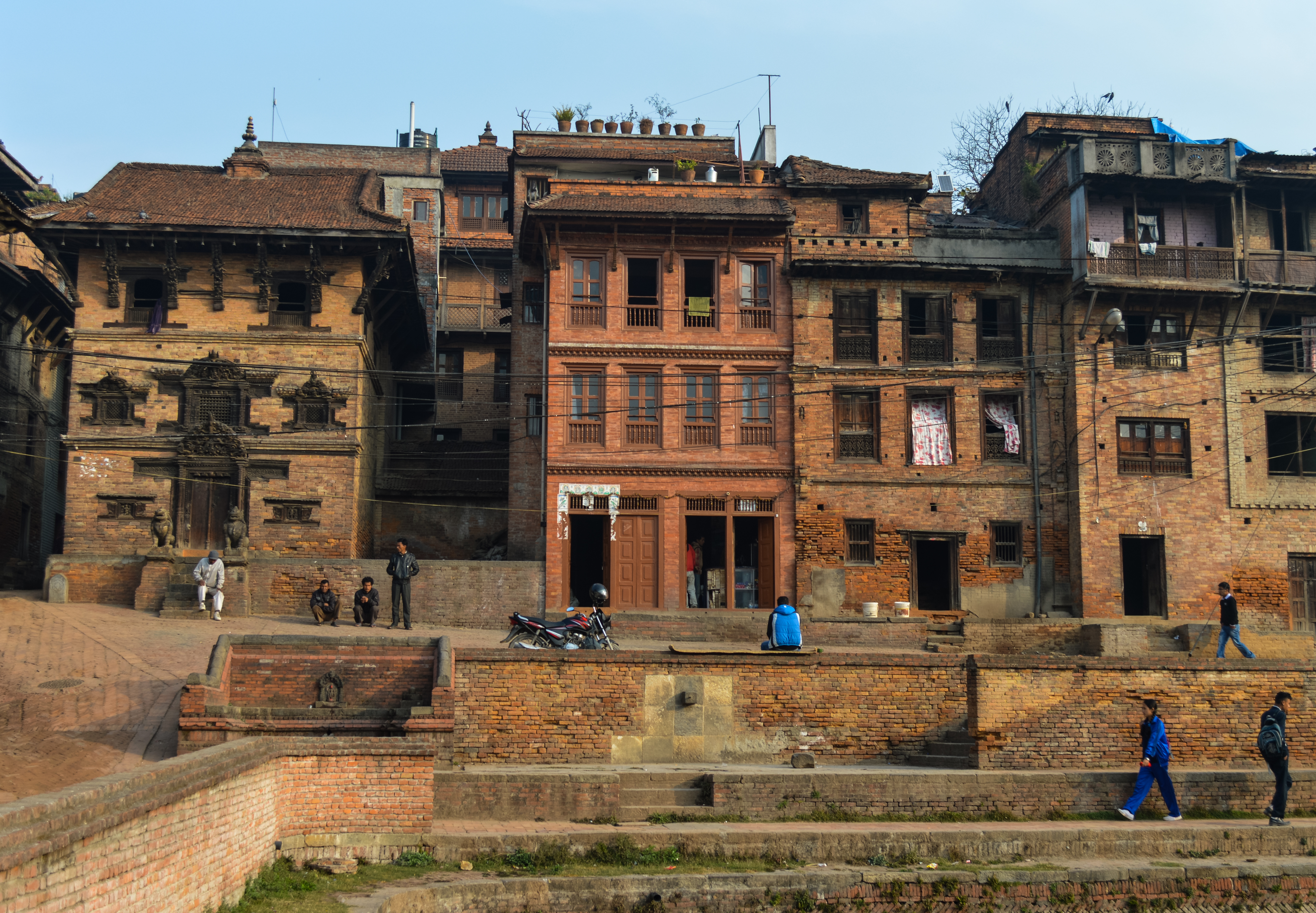
Traditional Newari houses.

Traditional Newar houses commonly consist of three or four stories and faced outwards to either the street or a courtyard. These houses sometimes have a shop-front on the street-facing side and the inner-facing sides are used as living spaces. Some of the houses are connected at the attic level and this space is used for communal feasts. The Newar house is primarily made of red brick, mud mortar and timber.

=== Madhesi houses ===
Madhesi style houses are most often found in the Terai region. All Madhesi houses are traditionally built using locally available materials such as mud, bamboo, thatch and wood. Walls are often made of wattle and daub, providing natural insulation against extreme heat of summer and the cool winters. The roofs are typically thatched or made of tiles (Khapada), sloping to allow rainwater to drain efficiently during the monsoon season. Sometimes pot made of mud is decorated and crafted artistically and placed at the centre of the roof. Most Madhesi houses are single- story structures, with rectangular or square layouts. The home often include open courtyards, which serves as multifunctional spaces for cooking, gatherings and drying crops. The emphasis on ventilation is evident, with small small windows and verandas designed to keep the interior cool. While minimalism defines the core structure, Madhesi architecture often incorporates intricate wood carvings on doors, windows and pillars. These carvings display cultural motifs, including floral patterns and depiction of religious symbols, adding a touch of artistry to the otherwise utilitarian design. And in the traditional mud houses, the wall is often decorated with paintings. The painting includes flowers, human beings, animals, regulus symbols and Mithila’s paintings. The main door are mostly faced to east.

=== Sherpa houses ===
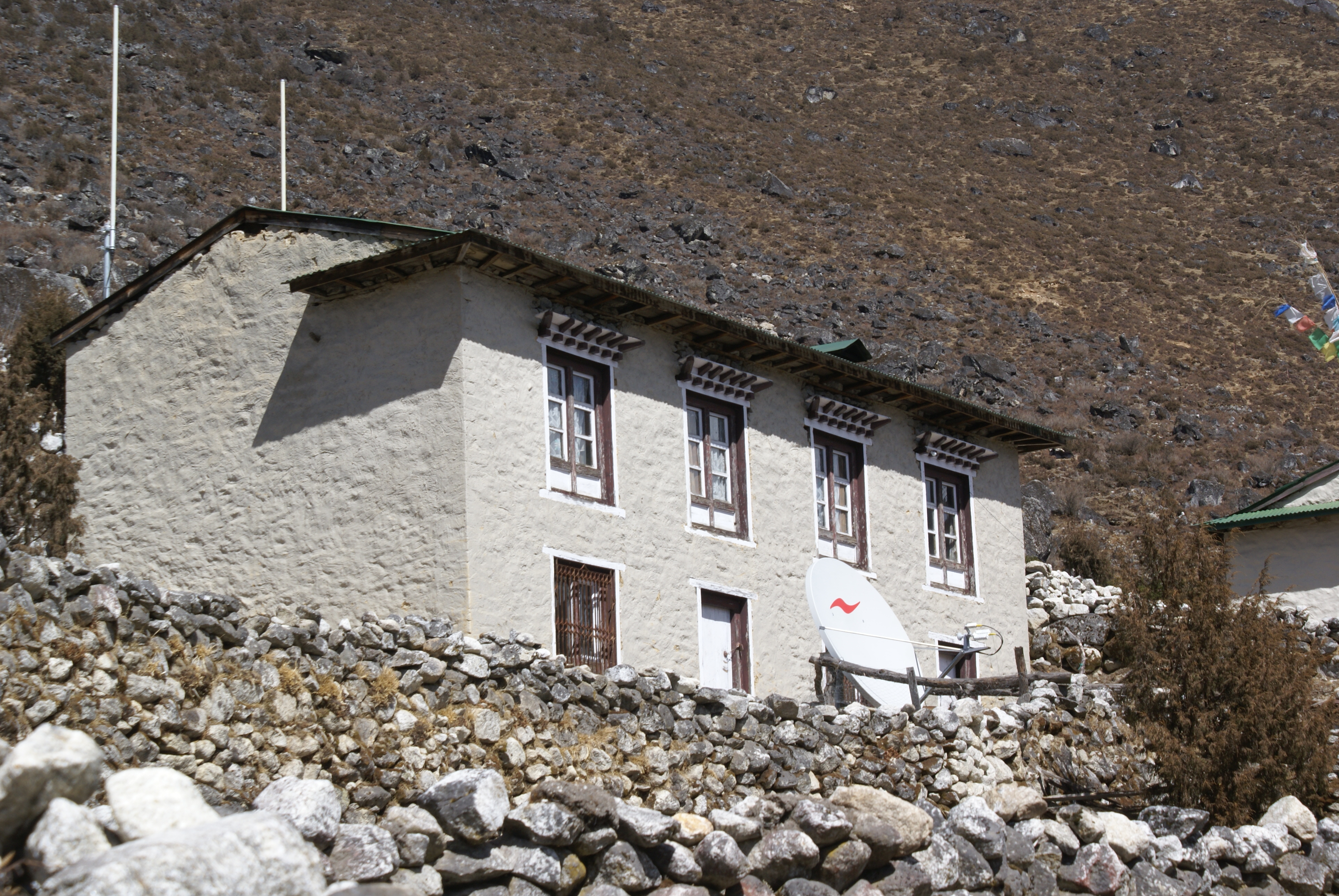
Sherpa house with modern features.

Sherpa style houses are most often found in the Khumbu region. All Sherpa houses feature an elongated shape, have two stories, a rigid roof and most have the ground floor built into the hill or slope behind it. Sherpa houses do not have doors, windows or any other openings that face the back of the house - primarily because they are built into the slope, but also because the sun does not reach here. The houses are well built with an outer protective wall covering an internal wooden frame.

=== Traditional houses (temperature and climate) ===
Due to Nepal’s hot, dry summers and cold winters, its traditional housing is architecturally designed to cope with this climate. Nepali houses contain features that enable them to remain a pleasant temperature indoors, including:

- Use of materials such as stone
- Eaves or overhangs to prevent excessive sun exposure
- Doors and windows without glass.

These passive cooling features have been found to effectively keep Nepali residences temperate.

== Temple architecture ==
Temples in Nepal are predominantly Hindu places of worship. It is common for temples to feature a pagoda roof. Other common features of Nepalese temples include pillars with animals, humans and important deities depicted on them as well as carved wooden struts to support the structure.

=== Shikhara temple style ===
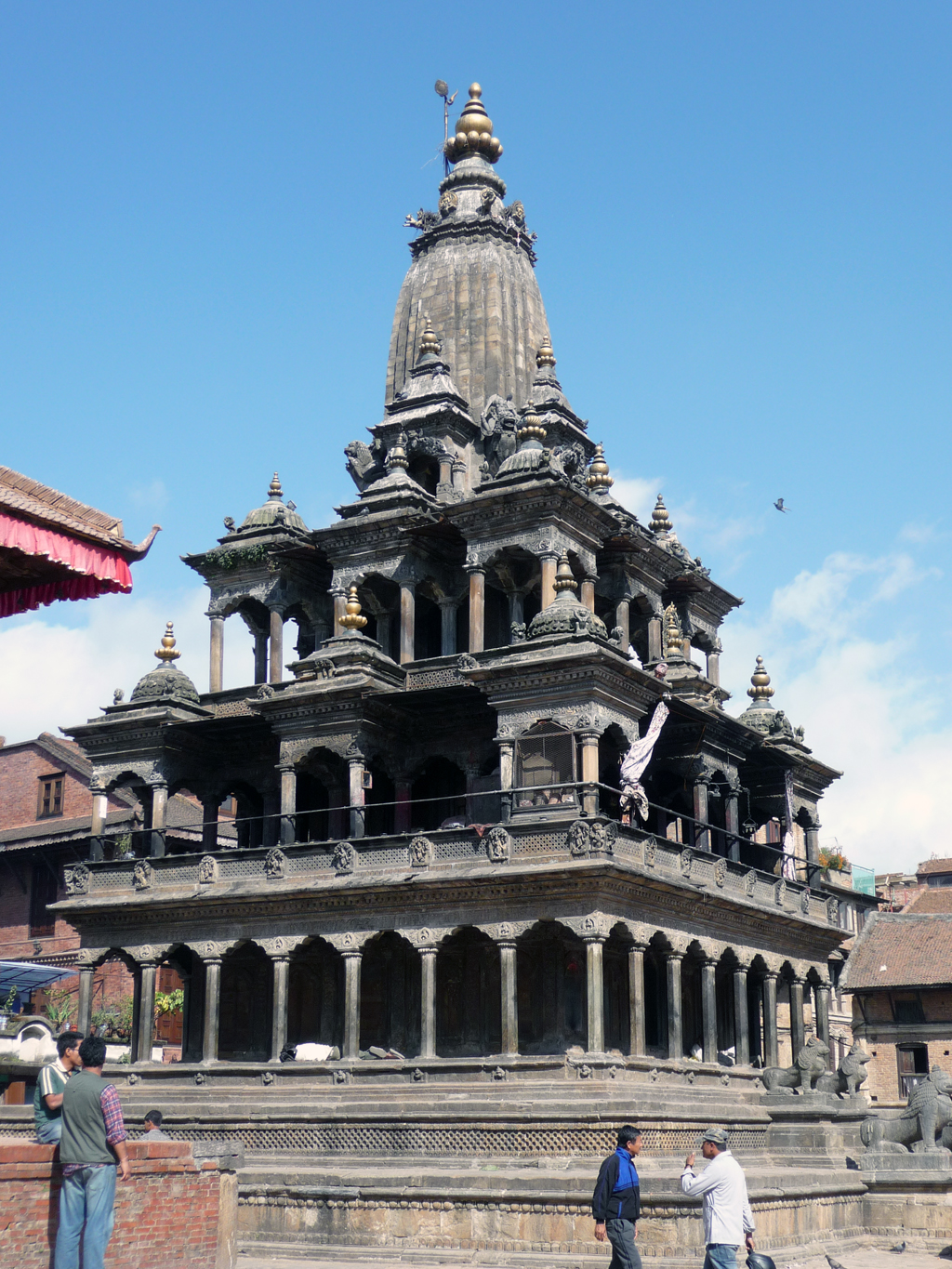
Krishna Mandir, Patan Durbar Square, Lalitpur, Nepal.

One popular style of temple is the Shikhara architectural pattern. This style can be seen in the Krishna Mandir Temple. This construction involves between five and nine layers that meet at the peak of the building to represent “the crown of Himalayas”. Each layer is held up by a row of vertical columns. At the peak, there are intricate decorations and ‘ornate’ details. It is most common for these structures to be made of stone although there are some that are made of brick. This style was first popularized by Gupta Rajvanxa in fourteenth century.Then this style was first seen in eighteenth century when mallas ruled Nepal.Other fine examples of this style of temple are mahaboudha temple, sayambhu's pratappur and aanantapur etc.

=== The Newar tiered temple ===
Another popular style of temple is the Newar pagoda style. These temples have between one and five layers of roofs and are dedicated either to Buddhism or Hinduism. These temples are often free-standing or attached to another building such as a palace and sometimes with an enclosed courtyard. One of the most notable styles seen in these temples is the tiered roofs. The floor plan is most often a square, representing a mandala. It is also common for the roofs to follow the pattern of the floor.

This style is the oldest in the Asian continent and derives its shape from Himalayan fir trees. The ground floor is the place to worship the deity and upper floors can be used as storage of religious items. There is gajura at the top which is the combination of a lotus base, an upside-down vase, a triangle and a kalasha. The pagoda style was introduced in Nepal from the beginning of the 13th century. Some tiered style buildings that are no longer standing include the Magriha of Madhav, Kailashkut Bhawan of Amshuvarma, and Bhadradiwas Bhawan of Narendradev. Similarly, the temples of Pashupatinath, Changunarayan, Chandeshwori and Banepa are examples of ancient architecture in the pagoda style. The Malla period produced various pagoda-style temples and palaces such as Nayatapola, Dattatraya of Bhaktapur, Kasthamandap of Kathmandu, Taleju Temple, Vajrabarahi, Vajrayogini.

=== Stupas ===
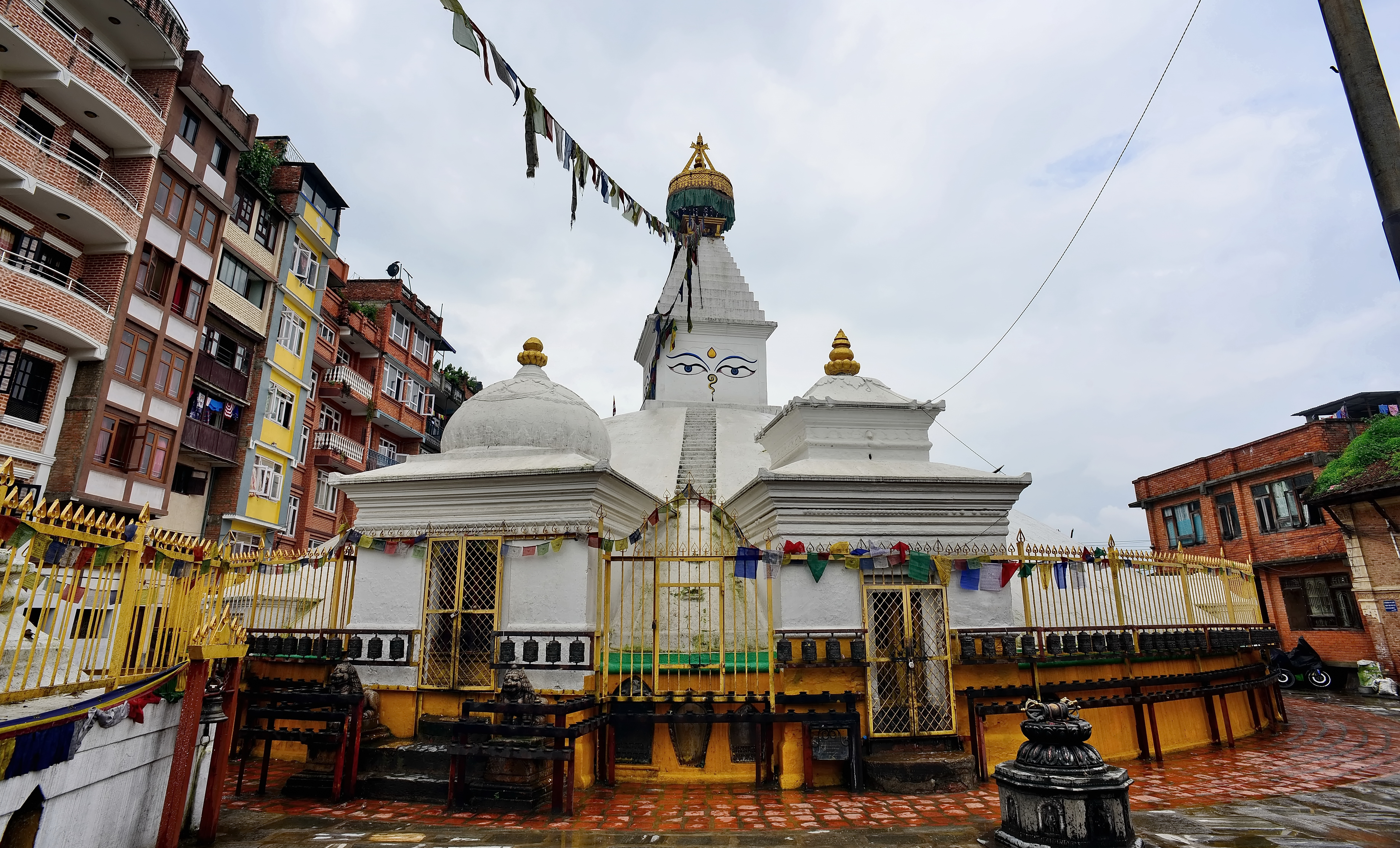
Ashoka Stupa Chaitya, Lalitpur district.

Stupas are similar to temples with characteristic dome-like structures that contain significant, often religious relics. They can be small stand-alone structures or part of a larger temple complex. The origin of stupas can be traced to first Aryan contact with India around 1500 BCE. Stupas are primarily associated with Buddhism and have been associated with it from its beginnings. The original style of stupa (a low flat dome), has been replicated in the four stupas that mark the corners of Lalitpur. The stupas at Lalitpur are on the four points of the compass and are displayed with accompanying Buddhas. The most common elements of stupas in Nepal are the pedestal that the stupa stands on, the mound of the actual structure and the spire on top.

=== Materials and layout ===
Commonly, the temples of Nepal are made of brick, stone or wood and despite some stylistic differences, most temples follow a similar architectural layout or pattern. Usually, the temples consist of either a single roof structure or one with multiple tiers. On these roofs, statues of the gods and goddesses reside - this feature is known as Mandir. It is also common to see these temples on a square or rectangular based floor-plan with one of the most common plans based on the Vastu Purusha Mandala. The mandala floorplan creates a foundation for the tiered pagoda layers on top of it. Temples with a square floor plan are often 9x9 with each grid square reserved for a particular god or goddess.

== Seismic issues ==
Due to Nepal’s geographical location on a major fault line, the country has experienced severe earthquakes throughout its history. The Bureau of Crises Prevention and Recovery of the United Nations Development Program ranked Nepal as the 11th most prone to earthquake risk. Many of Nepal's traditional structures have been destroyed due to devastating earthquakes and most of the building collapses were due to poor structural integrity, foundational issues and poor material quality. With different structural designs such as thickly packed earth walls, lower-lying structures and traditional wood connectors, the devastation of many buildings could be prevented. There have been experiments to test the durability, bonding and overall ability of materials to withstand earthquakes. Such experimentation has investigated the use of mesh made of hemp and recycled plastics, and loadbearing walls made of rammed earth. In the last 30 years, reinforced concrete building construction has increased in Nepal with concrete frames and infill masonry panels commonly used. It is important that both preexisting and new reinforced concrete buildings remain stable and soundly structured to ensure that in the event of an earthquake, these structures are less likely to collapse or be destroyed.

Some of the most at-risk buildings are Nepal's remaining pagoda temples. These unreinforced structures put them at significant risk of destruction in earthquakes. Most pagoda temples are ‘non-engineered’ constructions, with simple architectural layouts and construction. Due to the age of the pagoda temples, there was little to no thought given to seismic reinforcement or destruction at the time of construction.

=== Seismic restoration projects ===
Restoration and rehabilitation projects are considered vital for Nepalese architecture as their architectural structures are considered to be of great global heritage value.

One project that is focused on the restoration and rebuilding of Nepali architecture is the House Nepal project. The project falls under the ADSIDEO programme (Project for the Centre for Development Cooperation of Universitat Politècnica de València 2018-2020) and works alongside the Nepalese-based Abari: Bamboo and Earth Initiative. The main aim of the House Nepal project is to create houses with significantly less timber and to ensure that material used is locally sourced, cheap and environmentally sustainable. This means building houses out of solid and structurally sound earthen walls based on traditional Nepali construction techniques. These modernised compressed earthen walls contain compacted earth and bonding agents. Construction of the first houses began in Dhulikhel in 2020.

The Abari: Bamboo and Earth Initiative is another program that builds architecture that promotes and commemorates vernacular architecture. Traditional materials such as earth and bamboo are used throughout the initiative. After the earthquake that struck Nepal in April, 2015 which destroyed hundreds of thousands of traditional residences, Abari developed a proposal called Owner Driven Reconstruction. This program sought to encourage the owners of residences to implement seismic solutions for their homes so that they would withstand future earthquakes. To promote the Owner Driven Reconstruction, Abari distributed several manuals for the construction of houses and schools and the Nepalese government also considered these strategies as part of the countrywide reconstruction.

== See also ==
- Nepal
- Architecture of Kathmandu
- Hindu architecture
- Newa architecture
- Pagoda
- Society of Nepali Architects
