= Suresh David =

Indian physician

- Born: Suresh Samuel David; 22 March 1959 (age 67)
- Occupation: Emergency physician
- Years active: Since 1985
- Known for: Academic leadership in developing EM in India; Medical writing
- Notable work: Handbook of Emergency Medicine; Clinical pathways in Emergency Medicine; Textbook of Emergency Medicine

Suresh Samuel David (born March 22, 1959) is an Indian physician specializing in emergency medicine. The first Indian physician to be formally trained in emergency medicine, David pioneered the practice of emergency medicine in India and is credited with founding the department of emergency medicine at Christian Medical College, Vellore. He is the first person to hold the position of a professor in the discipline of Emergency Medicine in India.

David has published three medical books viz. Handbook of Emergency Medicine, Textbook of Emergency Medicine and Clinical pathways in Emergency Medicine, the former two publications reported to be the first handbook and textbook on emergency medicine by an Indian author. He is a Fellow of the Royal College of Physicians of London and the Australasian College for Emergency Medicine and a recipient of Best Doctor Award of Tamil Nadu Dr. M.G.R. Medical University. He has also received a citation, Leadership in Emergency Medicine, from A. P. J. Abdul Kalam, the former president of India.

== Education and career ==
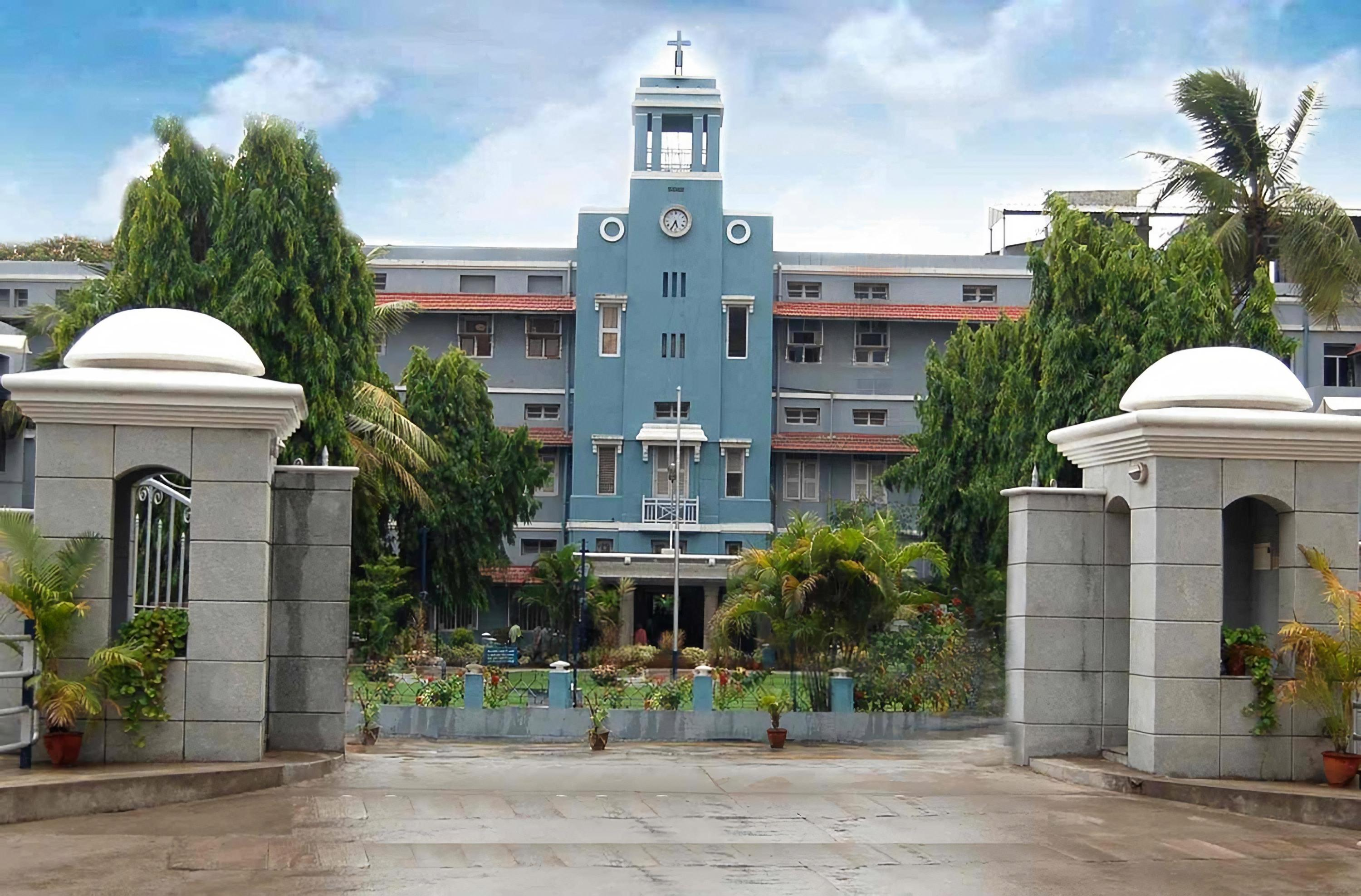
Christian Medical College, Vellore

David, born on 22 March 1959, graduated in medicine (MBBS) from Christian Medical College, Vellore in 1982 and started his career by joining Christian Mission Hospital, Dharapuram, Tamil Nadu. In 1985 he undertook training in general surgery at Madras Medical College, after which he moved to Dr. Somervell Memorial CSI Medical College, a rural secondary level mission hospital in Karakonam. Subsequently, he joined his alma mater, Christian Medical College as a junior lecturer in general surgery and during his service at CMC, he did a three-year advanced training in emergency medicine at Queen Elizabeth Hospital, Adelaide, an Australasian College for Emergency Medicine-accredited institution. On his return to India, he established the department of emergency medicine at CMC in 1994, the first independent department for emergency medicine in India; the department would go on to be recognized as the South Asian Regional Training Centre in Emergency Medicine by the World Health Organization in 2005. When he was appointed as a professor in 2002, he became the first person to hold the position of a professor in emergency medicine in India. He served as a senior consultant and head of emergency department at CMC for 22 years. During this period, he obtained a PhD from the University of Madras in 2013. He is also associated with All India Institute of Medical Sciences, Delhi as a visiting scientist. In 2017, Professor David was inducted as Principal Assessor by the National Accreditation Board for hospitals (NABH).

In 2019 he was appointed as Medical director at Princess Durru Shehvar Children's & General Hospital

== Legacy ==
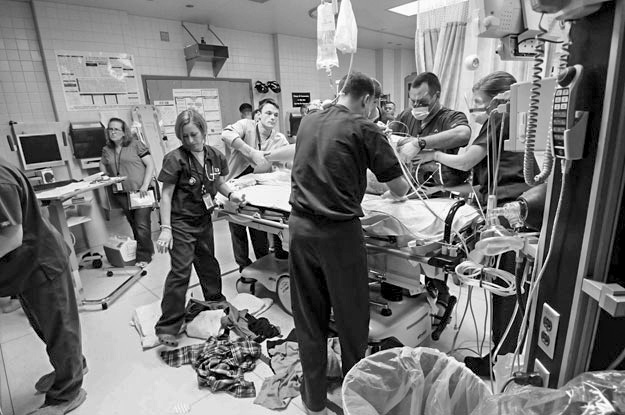
Emergency physicians conducting a trauma resuscitation

David is credited with pioneering the discipline of emergency medicine in India by restructuring the 'casualty' unit into the first independent emergency medicine department at CMC, Vellore in 1994. He headed the department and during his tenure, it evolved into a 45-bedded clinical unit, reported to be the largest of its kind in India in the private sector, tending to about 200 patients a day. The department started the first academic course (Note: fellowship course) in emergency medicine in India in 1997 during his tenure. He was instrumental in the introduction of the concept of Trauma Team and triage at CMC. The first of his three books, Handbook of Emergency Medicine was published by Elsevier in 1995, known to be the first handbook published by an Indian author on the subject. His second book, Textbook of Emergency Medicine, a 2380-page 2-volume work composed of 262 chapters contributed by 292 authors, was published in 2011, making it the largest comprehensive textbook of emergency medicine published thus far. The latest of his books, Clinical Pathways in Emergency Medicine, was again a two-volume work spread over 1510 pages, and the book was released in 2016. Besides, he has contributed chapters to books by others and has published over 50 medical papers and articles. (Note: Please see Articles section)

David chaired the scientific committee of SEMICON 2017, an annual conference on emergency medicine organized by Society for Emergency Medicine, India, held at Kochi in March 2017. He is consultant of the World Health Organization for emergency medicine for South-East Asia and is a faculty member of WHO-USAID programs on Disaster Medicine. In the aftermath of the 2004 Indian Ocean earthquake and tsunami, David led a team of 9 volunteers from CMC and reportedly established 18 medical camps in a week's time which provided medical assistance to 2879 people. He was the organizing secretary of the 7th National Conference of Emergency Medicine (EMCON 2005) held in October 2005 at Vellore and is the founder of Network of Emergency Physicians, India (NEPI), a web platform for exchange of information among emergency physician community. He sits in the board of advisors of EMS Leaders Forum and was a member of the three-member panel which designed courses for Hospital Preparedness for Emergencies (HOPE), a USAID-NSET initiative, in 2009. He has delivered several invited speeches or keynote addresses which include National Assembly on Pediatric Emergency Medicine (NAPEM) 2011 and Conclave on Legal and Ethical Challenges in Healthcare Ecosystem of 2017. He has also been associated with medical conferences as a patron or resource person and has participated in continuing medical education programs.

== Awards and honors ==
David, an honorary fellow of the Australasian College for Emergency Medicine, (2006), and the Royal College of Physicians (2013), has been recognized as a resource person in the field of health care by the East Asia Summit Earthquake Risk Reduction Centre of the National Institute of Disaster Management. Tamil Nadu Dr. M.G.R. Medical University awarded him the Best Doctor Award in 2012. He was awarded Leadership in Emergency Medicine by MMHRC - Institute Of Emergency Medicine at the Regional Conference in Emergency Medicine 2015, the citation presented to him by the former president of India, A.P.J. Abdul Kalam.

== Bibliography ==
=== Books ===
- Suresh David (1995). Handbook of Emergency Medicine. Elsevier. p. 316. ISBN 9788131230473.
- Suresh S. David; V. Anantharaman; Anthony F. T. Brown, Brian K. Nelson, Ashis Banerjee (November 1, 2011). Textbook of Emergency Medicine. Lippincott Williams & Wilkins. ISBN 978-81-8473-202-3.
- Suresh S David (May 23, 2016). Clinical Pathways in Emergency Medicine - Volume 1. Springer India. ISBN 978-81-322-2710-6.
- Suresh S David (June 6, 2016). Clinical Pathways in Emergency Medicine - Volume 2. Springer India. ISBN 978-81-322-2711-3.

=== Articles ===
- Adhikari, Debasisdas; Florence, Benita; David, Sureshsamuel (2016). "Prehospital trauma care in South India: A glance through the last 15 years". Journal of Family Medicine and Primary Care. 5 (1): 195–6. doi:10.4103/2249-4863.184669. PMC 4943141. PMID 27453878.
- Kumaran, Ssenthil; David, SS; Menezes, RG; Thirumalaikolundusubramanian, P (2014). "Concern, counseling and consent for bariatric surgery". Indian Journal of Nephrology. 24 (4): 263–4. doi:10.4103/0971-4065.133045. PMC 4119346. PMID 25097346.
- Senthilkumaran, Subramanian; David, Sureshs; Jena, Narendranath; Menezes, Riteshg; Thirumalaikolundusubramanian, Ponniah (2014). "Acute myocardial infarction and cocaine toxicity: One step closer". Indian Journal of Critical Care Medicine. 18 (2): 118. doi:10.4103/0972-5229.126091. PMC 3943121. PMID 24678159.
- Senthilkumaran, Subramanian; David, Suresh S; Jena, Narendra Nath; Thirumalaikolundusubramanian, Ponniah (2014). "Limitations and consumer aspects of point-of-care in snake envenomation". Emergency Medicine Australasia. 26 (2): 208. doi:10.1111/1742-6723.12161. PMID 24238068. S2CID 2236439.
- Senthilkumaran, Subramanian; David, Suresh S; Menezes, Ritesh G; Thirumalaikolundusubramanian, Ponniah (2013). "Acute myocardial infarction triggered by bee sting: An alternative view". Emergency Medicine Australasia. 25 (6): 615. doi:10.1111/1742-6723.12140. PMID 24125090. S2CID 45732006.
- Senthilkumaran, S; David, SS; Menezes, RG; Thirumalaikolundusubramanian, P (2013). "Need for parenteral pyridoxine: A clarion call". Indian Journal of Nephrology. 23 (4): 324–5. doi:10.4103/0971-4065.114501. PMC 3741988. PMID 23960360.
- Slade, T J; Grover, J; Benger, J (2008). "Atropine-resistant bradycardia due to hyperkalaemia" (PDF). Emergency Medicine Journal. 25 (9): 611–2. doi:10.1136/emj.2007.054114. PMID 18723723. S2CID 24657312.
- Senthilkumaran, Subramanian; David, Suresh S; Jena, Narendra Nath; Thirumalaikolundusubramanian, Ponniah (2013). "Epinephrine-induced myocardial infarction in severe anaphylaxis: Is β-blocker a bad actor or bystander?". The American Journal of Emergency Medicine. 31 (9): 1410. doi:10.1016/j.ajem.2013.04.027. PMID 23816194.
- Senthilkumaran, Subramanian; David, Suresh S; Menezes, Ritesh G; Thirumalaikolundusubramanian, Ponniah (2013). "Role of fresh-frozen plasma in angioedema". European Journal of Emergency Medicine. 20 (4): 292–3. doi:10.1097/MEJ.0b013e328360d8b6. PMID 23797347.
- Senthilkumaran, Subramanian; David, Suresh S; Menezes, Ritesh G; Thirumalaikolundusubramanian, Ponniah (2013). "C-reactive protein value in organophosphate-poisoned patients – Promises and pitfalls". Clinical Toxicology. 51 (2): 121. doi:10.3109/15563650.2013.765011. PMID 23356817.
- David, Suresh; Matathia, Sarah; Christopher, Solomon (2012). "Mortality Predictors of Snake Bite Envenomation in Southern India—A Ten-Year Retrospective Audit of 533 Patients". Journal of Medical Toxicology. 8 (2): 118–23. doi:10.1007/s13181-011-0204-0. PMC 3550238. PMID 22234395.
- David SS Divitha S. "The reliability, effectiveness, and epidemiological profile of the Vellore Model of Triage System". in "Abstracts from India's Second International Emergency Medicine and Disaster Preparedness Conference". Academic Emergency Medicine. 14 (5): e109–e113. 2007. doi:10.1111/j.1553-2712.2007.tb01794.x.
- David, Suresh S; Vasnaik, Mabel; Tv, Ramakrishnan (2007). "Emergency medicine in India: Why are we unable to ?walk the talk??". Emergency Medicine Australasia. 19 (4): 289–95. doi:10.1111/j.1742-6723.2007.00985.x. PMID 17655628. S2CID 24674771.
- David, S. S (2000). "'Mantle of safety'--aero-medical service in Central Australia". Journal of Postgraduate Medicine. 46 (3): 245–6. PMID 11298483.
- David, S. S (1997). "Strategy for the development of emergency medical services in India". Journal of the Indian Medical Association. 95 (1): 17, 26. PMID 9212563.
- David, S. S; Selvaranjini, S; Thomas, M (1997). "Incorporation of emergency medicine in the undergraduate curriculum". The National Medical Journal of India. 10 (2): 80–1. PMID 9153988.
