= Some (surname) =

Some is a surname. Notable people with this surname include:

- Thomas Some (divine) (1509/10–c. 1553), English Protestant divine
- Thomas Some (died 1649), Church of England priest, Canon of Windsor
- Belouis Some (né Neville Keighley; born 1959), British singer, songwriter and musician

== See also ==
- Sone (surname)
