= Sons (disambiguation) =

Sons is the plural form of son.

Sons, The Sons, and SONS may also refer to:

== Film and television ==
- Sons, 1989 American film directed by Alexandre Rockwell
- Sons (1996 film), Chinese film directed by Zhang Yuan
- Sons (2006 film), Norwegian film directed by Erik Richter Strand
- S.O.N.S: Sons of Nanay Sabel, 2019 Philippine film directed by Dado Lumibao
- Sons (2024 film), Danish film directed by Gustav Möller
- "Sons" (The Vice), a 1999 television episode

== Literature ==
- Sons (novel), 1932 novel by Pearl S. Buck
- The Sons, collection of stories by Franz Kafka

== Music ==
- Sons (band), formerly Sons of God, an Oklahoma rock band
- The Sons (band), a British alternative rock band
- Sons Ltd, an independent record label from Great Britain

== Others ==
- Southern Oregon Normal School (SONS), a former name for Southern Oregon University

== See also ==
- Son (disambiguation)
- Sones (disambiguation)
