= Mashona =

Mashona may refer to:

- Mashonaland, a region in northern Zimbabwe
  - Mashona language, a Bantu language
  - Mashona people, a Bantu ethnic group
- Mashona mole-rat, a species of rodent in the family Bathyergidae
- Mashona Washington, a retired tennis player from the United States
- 1467 Mashona, a rare-type carbonaceous asteroid from the outer regions of the asteroid belt
- HMS Mashona (F59), a Tribal-class destroyer of the Royal Navy that saw service in the Second World War

== See also ==
- Shona (disambiguation)
