= Thomas Soulemont =

Thomas Soulemont, Soleman, or Solme (c. 1500–1541) was French secretary to Henry VIII. A native of Jersey, he entered Henry VIII's and then Cromwell's service, and was clerk of the parliaments in 1540. He was also a learned antiquary.

== Life ==
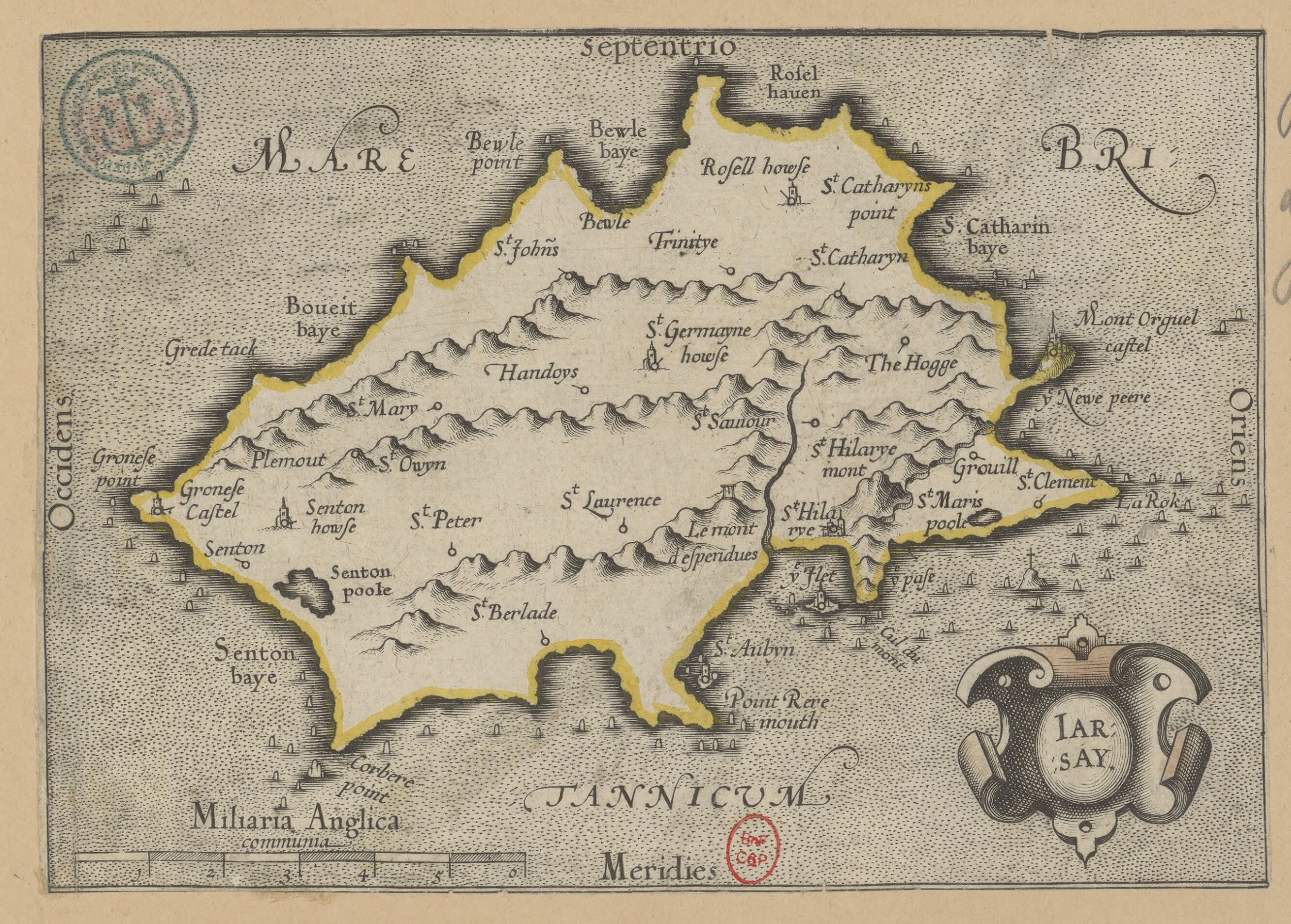
Map of Jersey ('Iarsay'), 1595

Map of Europe in 1519

Thomas Soulemont, a member of a prominent Guernsey and Jersey family, is said to have been born at Guernsey, but was more probably a native of Jersey. He was born in or before 1500. According to Wood he was educated at Oxford, and then entered the king's service. As a native of Jersey he was naturally a good French scholar, and before October 1532 he was appointed secretary of the French tongue to the king. In that month Nicholas Hawkins wished to take Soulemont with him on his embassy to Charles V, but Soulemont's services were required by Henry VIII in his interview with Francis at Calais. On 23 July 1534 he was collated to the prebend of Moreton Magna in Hereford Cathedral (Le Neve gives his name as 'Colemount'), and on 25 April 1537 to the prebend of Knaresborough in York Cathedral. About the same time he became secretary to Cromwell, and in 1540 he was clerk of the parliaments. On 5 January 1538–9 Thomas Wriothesley (afterwards first Earl of Southampton) received license to alienate to Soulemont the manors of Forwood and Fowey, Cornwall. On 13 July 1539 he was granted a lease of some buildings on the site of Greyfriars, London, and on 13 December following he received the nunnery of Canonleigh, with the tithes of Hokeforde rectory and Burlescombe church, Devonshire. He died on 12 July 1541, his heir being his brother John Soulemont, aged forty years. His successor as clerk of the parliaments was (Sir) William Paget (afterwards first Baron Paget).

== Works ==
Many of the Letters and Papers of Henry VIII, calendared by Gairdner, are in Soulemont's handwriting, and letters between him, Wriothesley, Cromwell, and other statesmen of the time are among the state papers. Soulemont is also said to have been a learned antiquary. A work by him entitled Select Antiquities relating to Britaine is quoted in Harrison's Description of Britain, prefixed to the 1586 edition of Holinshed, but neither it nor The Acts and Ghests of St. Thomas of Canterbury, also attributed to Soulemont, is known to be extant or to have been printed. Leland has verses to Soulemont in his Encomia Principum et Illustrium Virorum. Soulemont has invariably been confused with Thomas Some or Solme.

== Sources ==
- Carter, P. R. N. (2004). "Soulemont, Thomas (b. in or before 1500, d. 1541), administrator". Oxford Dictionary of National Biography (online ed.). Oxford University Press. doi:10.1093/ref:odnb/26043. (Subscription or UK public library membership required.)
- Le Neve, John (1854). Hardy, T. Duffus (ed.). Fasti Ecclesiae Anglicanae. Vol. 1. Oxford: Oxford University Press. p. 515.

Attribution:

- This article incorporates text from a publication now in the public domain: Pollard, Albert Frederick (1898). "Soulemont, Thomas". In Lee, Sidney (ed.). Dictionary of National Biography. Vol. 53. London: Smith, Elder & Co. pp. 271–272.
