= Sones (disambiguation) =

Sones are units of perceived loudness.

Sones may also refer to:

- Sones (surname)
- Fans of the South Korean pop band Girls' Generation

== See also ==
- Sone (disambiguation)
