= Miraj Cinemas =

Cinema chain in India

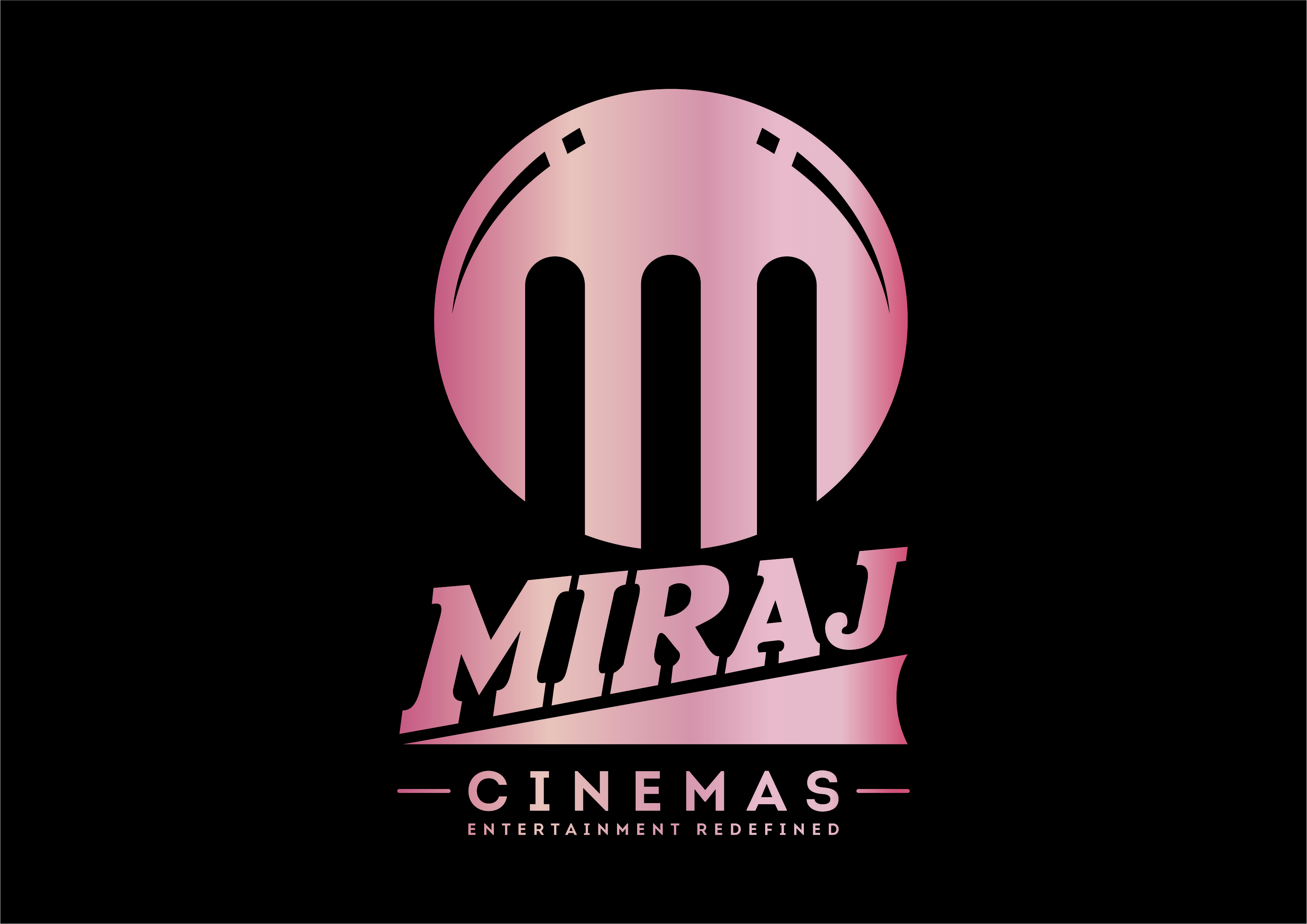
- Company type: Privately Held
- Industry: Entertainment (Cinema Chain)
- Headquarters: Mumbai
- Number of locations: 45 cities
- Key people: Madan Paliwal; Amit Sharma
- Website: Official Site

Miraj Cinemas is a division of Miraj Entertainment Limited, the entertainment wing of Miraj Group established in 1987 by Madan Paliwal. After production and release of movies like Sona Spa and Madaari, Miraj Group ventured in the cinema exhibition business in 2012 with Miraj Entertainment. After opening four multiplexes in one month in Punjab, Gujarat and Delhi NCR, it currently operates at 50 locations with 144 screens in India, across 14 States and 36 cities.

Other businesses covered by the Miraj Group include tobacco, printing and packaging, foods, pipes and fittings, real estate, retail store chains and shopping malls.
