= Jodi Breakers =

2012 Indian film by Ashwini Chaudhary

- Theatrical release poster
- Directed by: Ashwini Chaudhary
- Written by: Aakash Kaushik
- Story by: Sanyuktha Chawla Shaikh
- Produced by: Rajesh Rajilal
- Starring: R. Madhavan; Bipasha Basu; Milind Soman; Dipannita Sharma; Omi Vaidya; Mrinalini Sharma
- Edited by: Biren Jyoti Mohanty
- Music by: Salim–Sulaiman
- Distributed by: Prasar Visions Pvt. Ltd.
- Release date: 24 February 2012
- Running time: 127 minutes
- Country: India
- Language: Hindi
- Budget: ₹210 million (US$2.2 million)
- Box office: ₹334 million (US$3.5 million)

Jodi Breakers (transl. Couple Breakers) is a 2012 Hindi language Indian romantic comedy film directed by Ashwini Chaudhary. The film features R. Madhavan and Bipasha Basu in the leading roles with Milind Soman, Dipannita Sharma, Omi Vaidya and Mrinalini Sharma in supporting roles. The film was previously titled Shaadi Fast Forward but was later changed to Jodi Breakers. Part of the film was shot in Greece. It was released on 24 February 2012 to negative reviews from critics; however, it opened to mixed responses at the box office.

== Plot ==
Siddharth "Sid" Khanna, a recently divorced man, meets with his friends in Nano's Bar. He is happy and throws them a bachelor party. He is mainly upset about the huge alimony payments and, more importantly, that his ex-wife took the car he loved. A few months later, he is a bachelor who works as a divorce managing officer. He meets Sonali Agnihotri, who joins him in his business of splitting couples, and they earn well in the process. Together, they are known as the Jodi (Couple) Breakers.

Once they get an assignment from Mrs. Parera, who wishes to divorce her husband, Marc Parera, who is cheating on her. She tells him that he is in Greece with his mistress. Sid and Sonali decide to go to Greece, where they secretly take photos of the two. In the process, Sonali has started to like Sid, but he is unaware of this. One day Sid tells Sonali that it would be better if they saved the Pareras' marriage instead of helping in the divorce. Sonali agrees to the plan.

They call Mrs. Parera to Greece, and it is revealed that she is also Marc's business partner and is at a business meeting in Greece. Marc decides to do some business while his mistress, Maggie, tells him that she will go to a club named Medusa alone. When nobody is in their villa, Sid and Sonali break in, throw a condom in the dustbin, dance in the bar under the name Maggie, and call a masseuse. Sonali dances in the bar under the name Maggie.

When Marc goes to bar, Maggie, already bored, has left. He heard from the other people that Maggie was amazing. He goes home finds the condom and the masseuse and angrily walks out. The same night, Sid and Sonali also get drunk and have sex. Marc goes to Mrs. Parera's place and sleeps there. It is revealed that Mrs. Parera is not Marc's wife; her name is Ira, and she is Sid's ex-wife, who told him what to do in return for no alimony payments anymore, and that Maggie is Marc's wife.

Sid returns to India, and Sonali finds out about Ira and does not work with Sid anymore. Over the next few days, Sid realizes he loved her and also finds out that they caused a happy couple to break up and that Maggie is pregnant with Marc's child. Sid talks to Sonali and tells her that he wants to make amends. They reach Madonna's (Marc's grandmother) house and tell her the whole thing. She then gives them her full support.

She calls up Marc and Maggie and puts up a whole plan, which included them remaining with her together for some days, going to the church where they got married, having a party, and getting Marc's blood test done. Ira also discovers the plan and crashes at the party where Sid proposes to Sonali (part of the plan). She lied to him about being pregnant. Sid then confesses everything to Marc, initially resisting and angrily blurting out that Marc never slept with her. He beats him badly. At that time, a doctor whom Sid had called tells Marc that he is HIV positive and the blood test of Ira and Maggie needs to be done. Ira initially resisted and angrily blurted out that Marc never slept with her. Actually, she mixed sleeping pills for Marc's drink in Greece and led him to believe that they slept.

Madonna angrily slaps her and tells her to get out. Marc and Maggie reconcile. Sid then tells Sonali that he loved her, and they share a kiss.

== Cast ==
- R. Madhavan as Siddharth "Sid" Khanna
- Bipasha Basu as Sonali Agnihotri
- Milind Soman as Marc
- Dipannita Sharma as Maggie
- Omi Vaidya as Nainsukhbhai Chamanlal Patel a.k.a. Nano
- Mrinalini Sharma as Ira
- Tarana Raja as Dr. Isha
- Kubra Sait as Vinita
- Mazhar Sayed
- Gurpreet Saini
- Helen as Madonna

== Release ==
=== Controversy ===
Jodi Breakers faced controversy when the Indian distributors of the 2010 French film Heartbreaker alleged that the story of Jodi Breakers was plagiarised from Heartbreaker. The makers of Jodi Breakers offered to let the Heartbreakers team read the entire script, provided they agree to sign a Non Disclosure Agreement (NDA), which the Heartbreakers team was unwilling to sign.

== Reception ==
The movie received mixed to negative reviews from critics. Taran Adarsh of Bollywood Hungama gave the movie 3 out of 5 stars and concluded his review pointing out, "Jodi Breakers has an engrossing and smartly executed second half that tilts scales in its favor. The right dose of drama and romance, besides a trendy, harmonious musical score, only act as toppings". Kanika Sikka of DNA India gave the movie 2 out of 5 stars, mentioning, "Leave all expectations behind before entering the hall and you 'might' (urgency redefined) walk out with a smiling face." Savera R Someshwar of Rediff.com gave the movie 1 out of 5 stars, stating, "Jodi Breakers could have been a good romance or a good comedy but it's neither. The film is seriously flawed." Faisal Saif of Global Movie magazine gave the film 2 out of 5 stars and stated, "Nothing great [about the movie] to write about except performances".

== Soundtrack ==
Jodi Breakers

Soundtrack album by Salim–Sulaiman
- Released: 17 January 2012
- Genre: Feature film soundtrack
- Label: T-Series
- Producer: Salim–Sulaiman

Salim–Sulaiman chronology
Shakal Pe Mat Ja (2011)	Jodi Breakers (2012)	Heroine (2012)

The soundtrack of Jodi Breakers, released by T-Series on 17 January 2012, featured music composed by Salim–Sulaiman with lyrics penned by Irshad Kamil and Shabbir Ahmed.

Tracklist
No.	Title	Singer(s)	Length
1.	"Kunwara"	Salim Merchant	4:24
2.	"Bipasha"	Shraddha Pandit & Shadab Faridi	4:42
3.	"Darmiyaan"	Shafqat Amanat Ali & Clinton Cerejo	5:55
4.	"Mujhko Teri Zaroorat Hai"	Salim Merchant, Shadab Faridi & Shraddha Pandit	5:25
5.	"Jab Main Tumhare Saath Hoon"	Salim Merchant, Benny Dayal & Shilpa Rao	5:12
6.	"Darmiyaan (Reprise)"	Shreya Ghoshal	2:44
7.	"Bipasha (Remix)"	Shraddha Pandit & Salim Merchant	4:41
8.	"Mujhko Teri Zaroorat Hai (Remix)"	Rahat Fateh Ali Khan & Shraddha Pandit	4:41

=== Reception ===
The album received mixed to positive reviews. Joginder Tuteja of Bollywood Hungama gave the music an overall rating of three and half out of five saying "Jodi Breakers has all in it to be one of the more popular albums at the very beginning of the year. Salim-Sulaiman along with Irshad Kamil and Shabbir Ahmed have done their job and now it is up to the makers to make the most out of it and promote it well enough to enhance the music's reach."
