= Sone (surname) =

Sone (曽根, 素根, 曾禰) pronounced [sone] is a Japanese surname. Notable people with this surname include:

- Akira Sone (素根 輝, born 2000), Japanese judoka
- Arasuke Sone (曾禰 荒助, 1849–1910), Japanese politician
- Chūsei Sone (曽根 中生, 1937–2014), Japanese film director
- Dokan Sone (曽根 道貫, 1914–1992), Japanese gymnast
- Gal Sone (ギャル 曽根, born 1985), Japanese competitive eater and singer
- Kenichi Sone (曽根 健一, c. 1909–1946), Japanese internment camp commander and war criminal
- Koji Sone (曽根 康治, 1928–1981), Japanese judoka
- Mikiko Sone (曽根 幹子, born 1952), Japanese athlete
- Monica Sone (1919–2011), Japanese-American writer
- Nanami Sone (born 1999), Japanese football player
- Yasuo Sone (born 1950), Japanese professional golfer
- Yoshitada Sone (曾禰 好忠, birth and death date unknown), Japanese waka poet
- Yutaka Sone (曽根 裕, born 1965), Japanese contemporary artist

== Other people ==
- Alfredo Sone (born 1965), Chilean equestrian
- Hubert Lafayette Sone (1892–1970), American Methodist missionary in China
- Ira Sone (born 1989), Indian television actress
- Renata Soñé (born 1982), American-born Dominican beauty pageant titleholder, model, and actress
- Francis Sone, English MP

== See also ==
- Sone (disambiguation)
- Some (surname)
