= Biren Jyoti Mohanty =

Indian film editor

- Born: Cuttack, Odisha, India
- Occupation: Film editor
- Years active: 2005–present
- Known for: Luck, Jodi Breakers

Biren Jyoti Mohanty is an Indian film editor.

== Career ==
Biren is a film editor in Bollywood, he is known for editing Luck and Jodi Breakers.

== Editor ==
| Year | Film | Language | Notes |
|---|---|---|---|
| 2009 | Luck | Hindi | |
| 2011 | Chocolate | Odia | |
| 2012 | Jodi Breakers | Hindi | |
| 2012 | Luchakali | Odia | |
| 2013 | Sona Spa | Hindi | |
| 2014 | Babloo Happy Hai | Hindi | |
| 2014 | Fateh | Punjabi | |
| 2015 | Kaun Kitne Paani Mein | Hindi | |
| 2016 | Bhabhipedia | Hindi | |
