= Madan Paliwal =

Indian businessman

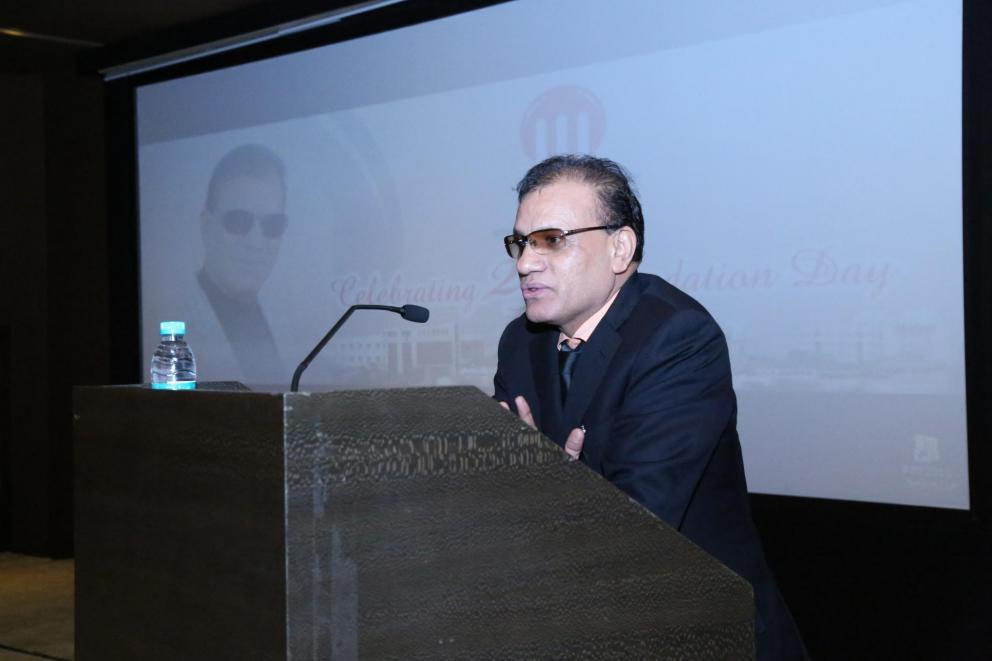
- Madan Paliwal
- Born: 10 July 1959 (age 66); Nathdwara, Rajsamand, Rajasthan, India
- Occupation: Chairman of Miraj Group
- Spouse: Sushila Paliwal
- Parent: Deepchand Paliwal
- Website: Madan Paliwal

Madan Paliwal (born 10 July 1959) is an Indian business magnate, investor, and philanthropist. He is the chairman of Miraj Group which came into existence in August 1987. He leads a large number of companies.

In India he is one of the producers of Bollywood film industry and has produced some movies like Madaari, Queens destiny of dance, Sona Spa. His major interests in entertainment include Miraj Cinemas, a chain of several multiplex cinemas throughout India.

== Early life ==
Madan Paliwal was born on 10 July 1959, in Nathdwara, Rajasthan. He attended Bada Bazar School and Sanskrit School, Nathdwara and Government College, Nathdwara. He started his entrepreneurial activity in class six as a small time businessman cum worker, doing business and different jobs alongside his studies.

== Business career ==
Madan Paliwal is the founder and chairman of the Miraj Group, including Miraj Products Pvt. Ltd., Miraj Developers Ltd., Miraj Entertainment Ltd., Miraj Multicolours Pvt. Ltd., Miraj Pipes and Fittings Pvt. Ltd. and Miraj Cinemas, Miraj Tradecom Private Limited. The constituent companies are engaged in the ongoing economic transformation of India. He leads a large number of companies spread all over India.

== Personal life ==
Madan Paliwal is married to Sushila Devi Paliwal. He lives in a private three storey building in Nathdwara, Rajasthan named 'Tathakim' worth millions. He loves to promote sports activities and constructed a cricket stadium at Nathdwara.

== Social responsibilities ==
To mark the pious days of the Navratri, Mr. Madan Paliwal has organised Ram Katha by famous preacher Morari Bapu at many places of India and placed an invite along with C. P. Joshi (former Minister of Road Transport and Highways) to the President of India at Rashtrapati Bhavan. He also witnessed the oath ceremony of Narendra Modi (Prime Minister of India). Madan Paliwal has built a 351 foot (107 m) Lord Shiva statue at Nathdwara. It is the tallest statue of Lord Shiva in the world (100 feet taller than the Statue of Liberty, which is similar to a 35 storey building). The construction of the giant figurine is backed by Miraj Group.

In 2025, Madan Paliwal launched a large-scale environmental initiative to plant one crore trees across India. The project aims to promote ecological sustainability and community awareness, with a focus on long-term care and maintenance of the plantations. Supported by Miraj Group’s dedicated resources and infrastructure, the initiative reflects Paliwal’s commitment to creating a greener future for coming generations.
