= Son (disambiguation) =

A son is a male offspring in relation to a parent.

Son, SON, or The Son may also refer to:

== Places ==
- Son, Ardennes, a commune in the Ardennes, France
- Son, Netherlands, a village in the Netherlands
- Son, Norway, a village in Norway
- Santo-Pekoa International Airport in Vanuatu, IATA Code SON
- Saugeen Ojibway Nation, a group of First Nations in Canada
- Son River (Vietnam), a river in Vietnam
- Son River (also Sone), a tributary of the Ganges in central India

== People ==
- Son (Korean surname), a common Korean family name
- Thế Sơn, Vietnamese-American singer
- Francisco Javier Hidalgo Gómez, Spanish footballer known as 'Son'
- Son Heung-Min, South Korean footballer

== Arts and entertainment ==
=== Films ===
- The Son (1953 film), a Danish family film
- Son (1955 film), a 1955 Soviet drama film
- The Son (2002 film), directed by Jean-Pierre Dardenne and Luc Dardenne
- Son (2008 film), a short film
- The Son (2019 Argentine film), with Joaquín Furriel
- The Son (2019 Bosnia and Herzegovina film)
- Son (2021 film), an Irish horror film
- The Son (2022 film), a drama film by Florian Zeller

=== Television ===
- Son (TV series), Turkey
- The Son (TV series), based on the novel of the same name by Philipp Meyer
- "The Son" (Friday Night Lights), in the Friday Night Lights TV drama series

=== Literature ===
- Son (novel), a 2012 book by Lois Lowry
- Son: A Psychopath and his Victims, a 1983 novel by Jack Olsen
- The Son (Meyer novel), a 2013 novel by Philipp Meyer
- The Son (Nesbø novel), a novel by Jo Nesbø.
- The Son (Hasenclever play), a 1914 play by Walter Hasenclever
- The Son (Zeller play), a 2018 play by Florian Zeller

=== Music ===
==== Styles ====
- Son (music), a Cuban musical style
- Son, a rhythm of Colombian vallenato music
- Mexican Son music, a folk music category

==== Groups and labels ====
- Son (band), a Canadian alternative rock band

==== Albums ====
- Son (Katya Chilly album)
- Son (Juana Molina album), 2006
- Son (Toiling Midgets album)

==== Songs ====
- "Son", by Baboon from Something Good Is Going to Happen to You

=== Fictional characters ===
- The Son, a character in the Star Wars universe

== Religion ==
- Korean Seon or Sŏn Buddhism
- God the Son or The Son, in Christianity

== Science and technology ==
- SON (gene), a gene and the protein that it encodes
- SON, a type of high pressure sodium vapor lamp
- Self-organizing network
- Small-Outline No leads (SON), a Quad Flat No-leads package for integrated circuit
- Supraoptic nucleus, a body of cells in the hypothalamus

== Other uses ==
- Son (political party), a Galician political party created in 2015
- Socked on the nose in philately, with centered postmark
- Songhay languages (ISO 639-2 and ISO 639-5 codes: son)
- Óðrerir and Són, container of Nordic mythical mead of poetry
- Dream (Taras Shevchenko poem), in Ukrainian: Сон, romanized: Son
- September, October, November, a 3-month season period

== See also ==
- Sons (disambiguation)
- Sone (disambiguation)
- Sun (disambiguation)
- Sona (disambiguation)
