= Naresh Kumar Kumawat =

Indian sculptor

- Born: Pilani, Rajasthan, India
- Occupation: Sculptor
- Years active: 2000 – present

Naresh Kumar Kumawat is an Indian sculptor. His work includes religious statuary, commissioned public artworks, and architectural sculpture projects. Media reports have linked him to work on the Statue of Belief in Nathdwara, Rajasthan, and to large commissioned statues installed in India and abroad, including a 51-foot statue of Rama in Mississauga, Canada.

Profiles on Kumawat have appeared in Deccan Chronicle, The Statesman and Global Indian, describing his studio work and selected commissions.

== Early life ==
Kumawat was born in Pilani, Rajasthan. According to published interviews, he learned sculpting in his family's workshop before taking up commission-based work.

== Career ==
Kumawat maintains a studio in Gurugram, Haryana, where he works with a team on modelling and fabrication for commissioned sculptures.

Projects reported in mainstream or regional media include:

- involvement in fabrication work for the Statue of Belief at Nathdwara;
- relief and sculptural components for the new Parliament building in New Delhi;
- a 51-foot statue of Rama in Mississauga, Canada;
- commissions for temples and public spaces in India and overseas.

== Style and methods ==
Published sources note that his studio uses traditional sculpting alongside digital tools including 3D modelling and CNC machinery for large-scale fabrication.

== Selected works ==
Selected works (reported)
Year	Work	Location	Notes / Source
2022	Statue of Belief (reported contribution)	Nathdwara, Rajasthan	Identified in media reports on fabrication work.
2023	Samudra Manthan relief (reported)	New Parliament Building, New Delhi	Mentioned in interviews.
2025	51-foot statue of Rama	Mississauga, Ontario	Covered in multiple national outlets.
2025	Sculpture of Heeraben Modi (reported)	New Delhi	Discussed in NDTV feature.
