= National Society for Earthquake Technology – Nepal =

- Founded: June 18, 1993
- Purpose: Earthquake engineering, disaster risk reduction, seismic risk
- Location: Sainbu, Lalitpur District, Nepal
- Region served: Worldwide
- Key people: Dr. Amod Mani Dixit, President; Surya Narayan Shrestha, Executive Director; Dr. Ramesh Guragain, Deputy Executive Director
- Website: National Society for Earthquake Technology – Nepal (NSET)

The National Society for Earthquake Technology – Nepal (NSET) is a Nepali non-governmental organization working on reducing earthquake risk and increasing earthquake preparedness in Nepal as well as other earthquake-prone countries.

== History ==
NSET was founded on June 18, 1993, and registered at the District Administration Office, Kathmandu, on April 28, 1994, and at the Social Welfare Council on August 10, 1998.

== Purpose ==
NSET was founded with the vision of "Earthquake Safe Communities in Nepal by 2020".

== Activities ==
In order to combat the growing risks posed by a devastating earthquake in Nepal in the near future, NSET seeks to make builders and citizens aware of affordable construction techniques that can significantly reduce seismic risk. Currently, 80 per cent of new buildings in Nepal are built informally, without engineering expertise. NSET's activities target the informal builders of such edifices: the organisation conducts demonstrations using a 'Shake Table', a tool that shows the effects of an earthquake on scale models of two buildings, one built using traditional methods and one incorporating earthquake engineering. The Shake Table demonstration has been given to builders, masons, engineers, policy makers and health and disaster response personnel and is now being used in India, Afghanistan, and Tajikistan as well.

NSET also retrofits schools and other buildings in Nepal to make them more earthquake proof and runs earthquake drills for organisations such as hospitals, to allow them to perfect their disaster response techniques.

== Association Memberships ==
NSET is a founding member of the following associations:

- Asian Disaster Reduction and Response Network (ADRRN)
- Coalition for Global School Safety (COGSS)
- Disaster Preparedness Network Nepal (DPNet)
- International Live Lessons Transfer Network (TeLLNet)

NSET is also a member of the following associations:

- International Association for Earthquake Engineering (IAEE)
- World Seismic Safety Initiative (WSSI)
- Kirtipur Volunteer Society

== See also ==
- 1934 Nepal–Bihar earthquake
- 1988 Nepal earthquake
- Disaster risk reduction
- Earthquake engineering
- Seismic retrofit
- Seismic risk
- Society of Nepali Architects
