= Sone Station =

Sone Station (曽根駅) is the name of two train stations in Japan:

- Sone Station (Hyōgo)
- Sone Station (Osaka)
