= Shona =

Shona often refers to:

- Shona people, a Southern African people
  - Shona language, a Bantu language spoken by Shona people today
  - Shona languages, a wider group of languages defined in the early 20th century
  - Kingdom of Zimbabwe, a Shona state in the 13th to 15th centuries

Shona may also refer to:

- Shona (album), 1994 album by New Zealand singer Shona Laing
- AmaShona, Shona speaking people
- Shona (given name)
- Shona cabbage, a common name for the vegetable Cleome gynandra
- Shona hopper, a butterfly
- Shona hotspot, a geographical feature in the Atlantic Ocean
- Sone River or Shona, a tributary of the Ganges in India
- Eilean Shona, a Scottish island

== See also ==
- Sona (disambiguation)
