= Statue of Belief =

World's 4th tallest statue in Rajasthan, India

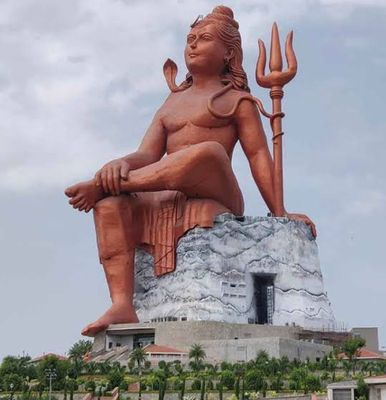
- Vishwas Swaroopam
- Interactive map of Statue of Belief
- Location: Ganesh Tekri, Nathdwara, Rajasthan, India
- Coordinates: 24.9190°N 73.8178°E
- Builder: Shapoorji Pallonji Group
- Type: Statue
- Material: Steel framing, reinforced by concrete and brass coating, bronze cladding
- Height: 369 feet (112 m)
- Beginning date: April 2013
- Completion date: 17 August 2019
- Opening date: 29 October 2022
- Dedicated to: Lord Shiva
- Website: www.statueofbelief.com

Vishwas Swaroopam (also known as Statue of Belief) is a statue of the Hindu god Shiva constructed at Nathdwara in Rajasthan, India. It opened on 29 October 2022. Vishwas Swaroopam is the tallest statue of Shiva in the world and 4th tallest statue worldwide.

== Description ==
Shiva is depicted in a seated position with his legs crossed and holding a trishula in his left hand. Shiva's left foot is thrown over the knee of his right leg. The facial expression is detached, meditative. The statue has a distinctive copper shade. There are two vantage points that offer a panoramic view of the surrounding countryside. Design for the statue began in 2011, construction began in 2016, and it was completed in 2020. The overall statue is 369 feet (112 m) tall; the pedestal is 110 feet (34 m) tall. The statue can be seen from as far as 20 kilometres (12 mi) away.

The interior of the statue contains an exhibition hall as well as public viewing galleries accessible by elevator at 20 feet (6.1 m), 110 feet (34 m), and 270 feet (82 m). The installation includes a statue of Nandi, Shiva's bull, measuring 25 feet (7.6 m) tall and 37 feet (11 m) long. The 16-acre grounds also include a parking facility, three herbal gardens, a food court, a laser fountain, an area for handicraft shops, viewing platforms, musical fountains, souvenir shops, and a pond. There is a mini-train on site for quick local sightseeing.

== Construction ==
The statue was conceived of by Indian businessman Madan Paliwal, sculpted by Murtikar Naresh Kumawat, and constructed by Shapoorji Pallonji. The structure consists of an inner core of reinforced cement concrete walls surrounded by a structural steel framework which is itself surrounded by a moulded ultra-high-performance concrete exterior. The surface was sprayed with liquefied zinc, then coated with copper.

== See also ==
- List of tallest statues
- Statue of Equality (Ramanuja)
- Kailashnath Mahadev Statue, in Nepal, the second-tallest Shiva statue in the world
