= Sona Spa =

- Movie poster
- Directed by: Makarand Deshpande
- Produced by: Madan Paliwal
- Starring: Naseeruddin Shah; Aahana Kumra; Shruti Vyas; Pooja Pradhan; Nivedita Bhattacharya; Vineet Sharma; Romi Jaispal; Devyani
- Cinematography: Rajiv Jain
- Edited by: Biren Jyoti Mohanty
- Music by: Shailendra Barve
- Production company: Miraj Cinemas
- Distributed by: Miraj Entertainment Ltd
- Release date: 22 March 2013
- Country: India
- Language: Hindi
- Budget: ₹100 million (US$1.0 million)
- Box office: ₹2.4 million (US$25,000)

Sona Spa is a 2013 Hindi drama film directed by Makarand Deshpande and produced by Madan Paliwal. The film features Naseeruddin Shah, Aahana Kumra, Shruti Vyas and Pooja Pradhan as main characters.

== Cast ==
- Naseeruddin Shah as Baba Dayanand
- Aahana Kumra as Ritu
- Shruti Vyasa as Rucha
- Pooja Pradhan as Indira
- Nivedita Bhattacharya as Meenakshi
- Akkash Basnet as Sachin
- Vineet Sharma as Rucha's father
- Romi Jaspal as Choksi
- Devyani as Shirley
- Rohit Soans as Owner of Sona Spa
- Aditi Girkar as Sound Effects

== Soundtrack ==
| No. | Title | Singer(s) | Length |
|---|---|---|---|
| 1. | "Neend Ka Bijness" | Sudesh Bhosle |
| 2. | "Sona Spa" | Neha Rajpal |

== Reception ==
A critic from The Times of India rated the film 3/5 stars and wrote, "Through humour, it addresses the gravest tragedy. It also makes us wonder if it’s better to live a lie instead of succumbing to the harsh reality. The concept is great, but the execution could have been better." A critic from IANS gave it 3/5 stars and wrote, "The editing, though, could have been less uneven and patchy and more sure of where and when the characters should stop speaking."

Nandini Ramnath of LiveMint wrote, "The acting is mostly amateurish, and the production design is low-budget tacky—the spa is quite obviously a suburban hotel in Mumbai. Neither sensual dream nor psychological nightmare, Sona Spa is a one-liner in search of depth and coherence." Trisha Gupta of Firstpost wrote, "Sona Spa where the girls sleep for you, not with you is an intriguing look into our inner lives. But the film by Makarand Deshpande is eventually like a restless night in bed - choppy, dreamy but not fully satisfying." Preeti Arora of Rediff.com gave it 0.5/5 stars and wrote, "Instead of developing the idea enough and shaping it into some concretely original story-telling, Deshpande waxes eloquent with a battery of fancy (also unnecessary) dialogue and way too many sub-plots."
