= Sones (surname) =

Sones is a surname. Notable people with the surname include:

- Brian Sones (born 1989), American racing driver
- F. Mason Sones (1918–1985), American physician
- Paul Sones (1936–2015), American Paralympic athlete
- Sonya Sones (born 1953), American poet and author
