= Thomas Some (divine) =

English Protestant divine (1509 10–c. 1553)

Thomas Some or Solme (1509/10–c. 1553) was an English Protestant divine. An unwilling monk, he took up advanced Protestant views and was an active preacher under Edward VI, but probably fled abroad on Mary's accession. His treatise, the Lord's Flail, was burned by Bonner in 1546.

== Life ==
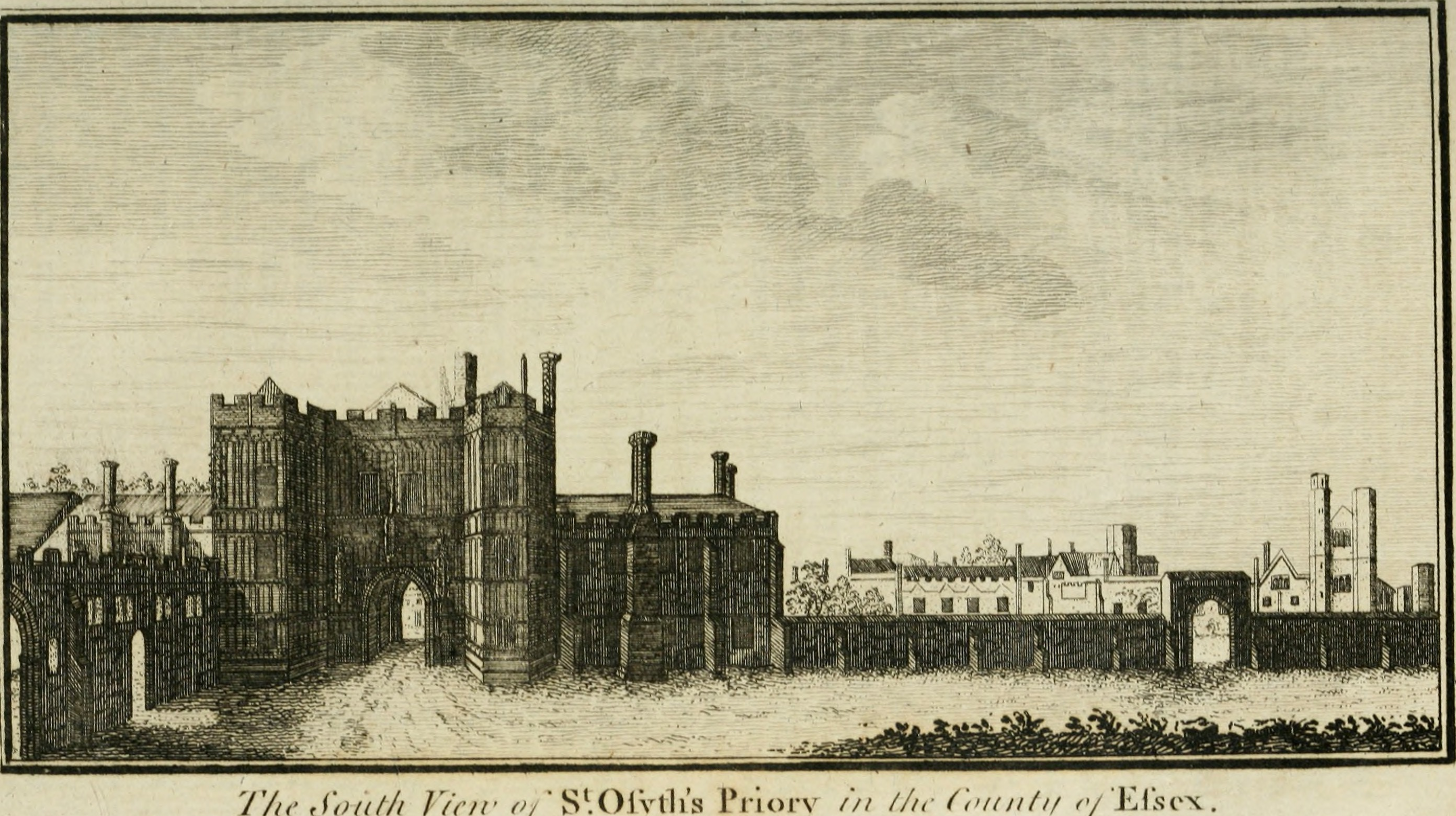
South view of the gatehouse of old St. Osyth's Priory in 1769; the abbey church was by then demolished.

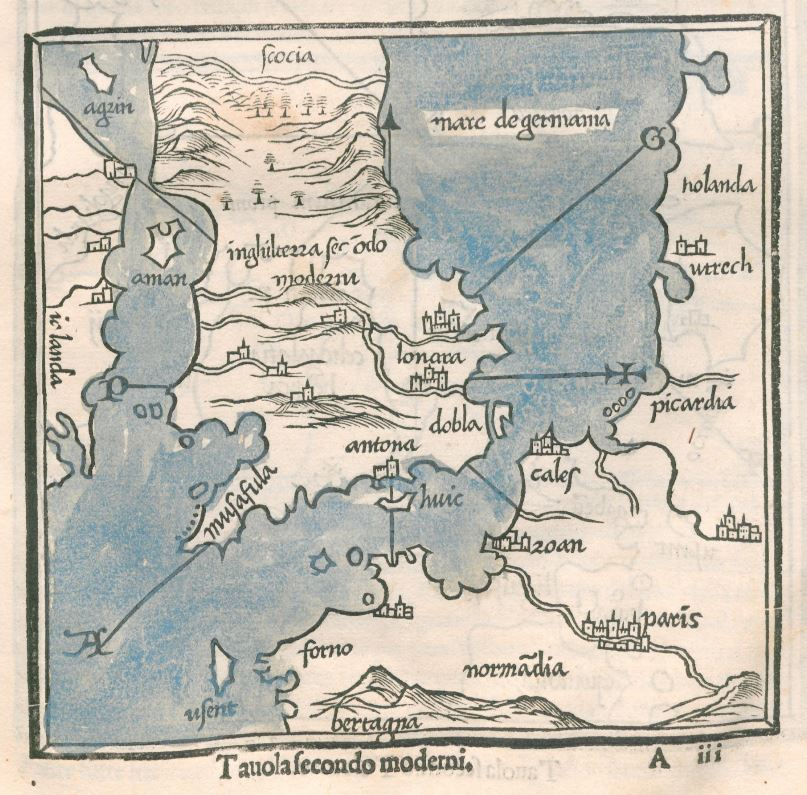
England and her neighbours, 1534

Thomas Some, born about 1509 or 1510, was probably the canon of St. Osyth's, Essex, who in 1535 wrote a letter (extant in Cotton. MS. Cleopatra E. iv. 8, 25, 26) to Cromwell, begging to be released from monastic life. He had, he said, been compelled to receive the habit in his fourteenth year by the threats of his schoolmaster, and for twelve years he had borne unwillingly the yoke of religion.

He adopted advanced Protestant views, and about 1540 published a Traetys callyde the Lordis flayle, handlyde by the Bushops poure thresshere, Thomas Solme, n.d., printed 'at Basyl by me Theophyll Emlos', 8vo (British Library). Soon afterwards he was 'imprisoned upon the thirty-nine articles', and in July 1546 the Lord's Flail was one of the books burnt by Bonner, in accordance with the King's proclamation.

After the accession of Edward VI Some became an active and popular preacher. In 1549 he 'gathered, writ, and brought into light the famous sermons of Master Hugh Latimer', i.e. the Seven Sermons, London, 1549, 8vo, for which Some wrote an introduction, dedicating the work to Catherine Grey, Duchess of Suffolk. In 1551 he appended some Latin verses to the Preservative or Triacle of William Turner, Dean of Wells; but the work on justification which he promised in his Lord's Flail does not appear to have been published.

Some appears to have fled on Mary's accession, and to have died abroad in or after 1553. He has been frequently confused with Thomas Soulemont or Solme.

== Works ==
1. A Traetys callyde the Lordis Flayle, Basil, n.d., 8vo.
2. Introduction and dedication to Hugh Latimer's Seven Sermons, London, 1549, 8vo.
3. Appended verses to William Turner's Preservative or Triacle, London, 1551.

== See also ==
- List of Protestant martyrs of the English Reformation#Persecution of Protestants under Mary I (1553–1558)

== Sources ==
- Foxe, John (1838). Cattley, Stephen Reed (ed.). The Acts and Monuments of John Foxe. Vol. 5. London: R. G. Seeley and W. Burnside. p. 568.
- Jones, Whitney R. D. (2004). "Solme [Some], Thomas (b. 1509/10, d. in or after 1553), protestant divine". Oxford Dictionary of National Biography (online ed.). Oxford University Press. doi:10.1093/ref:odnb/25995. (Subscription or UK public library membership required.)
- Strype, John (1822). Ecclesiastical Memorials. Vol. 1. Part 1. Oxford: Clarendon Press. p. 567.

Attribution:

- This article incorporates text from a publication now in the public domain: Pollard, Albert Frederick (1898). "Some, Thomas". In Lee, Sidney (ed.). Dictionary of National Biography. Vol. 53. London: Smith, Elder & Co. p. 218.
