= Society of Nepali Architects =

Independent non-profit association of Nepali architects

Society of Nepali Architects (SONA) is an independent non-profit association of architects in Nepal. It was established in 1990. It has collaboration with the ARCASIA, SAARCH, and UIA.

== Objectives ==
- promote the development of architecture and its related art, science and technology throughout Nepal
- promote the companionship, kindness and support within the architects and to safeguard their professional rights and interests
- increase the participation of the national architects in the national development
- enhance the professional ideals among the members
- develop relations, fellowship and goodwill with international architect's associations and institutions

== Activities ==
- It organizes an Architecture Festival annually in Nepal
- It was involved in reconstruction work in association with the American Institute of Architects after the Gorkha earthquake.
- It hosted the 14th regional assembly of South Asian architects in 2016.
