= Flos Carmeli =

Catholic hymn

Flos Carmeli (Latin, "Flower of Carmel") is a Marian Catholic hymn and prayer honouring Our Lady of Mount Carmel.

In the Carmelite Rite of the Mass, this hymn was the sequence for the Feast of Saint Simon Stock (c. 1165 - 1265), and since 1663, for the Feast of Our Lady of Mount Carmel on 16 July throughout the Latin liturgical rites. Said to have been written by Saint Simon Stock himself, the prayer is taken from the first two stanzas of the hymn. Its name comes from its incipit.

== Text ==
Various translations and musical settings exist besides the Gregorian chant one. Below is one version distinguished by "Tall vine blossom laden" in the second line.

Flos Carmeli,
vitis florigera,
splendor cæli,
virgo puerpera
singularis.

Mater mitis
sed viri nescia
Carmelitis
da privilegia
Stella Maris.

Radix Jesse
germinans flosculum
nos ad esse
tecum in sæculum
patiaris.

Inter spinas
quæ crescis lilium
serva puras
mentes fragilium
tutelaris.

Armatura
fortis pugnantium
furunt bella
tende præsidium
scapularis.

Per incerta
prudens consilium
per adversa
iuge solatium
largiaris.

Mater dulcis
Carmeli domina,
plebem tuam
reple lætitia
qua bearis.

Paradisi
clavis et ianua,
fac nos duci
quo, Mater, gloria
coronaris.
Amen. (Alleluia.)

Flower of Carmel,
Tall vine blossom laden;
Splendour of heaven,
Childbearing yet maiden.
None equals thee.

Mother so tender,
Who no man didst know,
On Carmel's children
Thy favours bestow.
Star of the Sea.

Strong stem of Jesse,
Who bore one bright flower,
Be ever near us
And guard us each hour,
who serve thee here.

Purest of lilies,
That flowers among thorns,
Bring help to the true heart
That in weakness turns
and trusts in thee.

Strongest of armour,
We trust in thy might:
Under thy mantle,
Hard press'd in the fight,
we call to thee.

Our way uncertain,
Surrounded by foes,
Unfailing counsel
You give to those
who turn to thee.

O gentle Mother
Who in Carmel reigns,
Share with your servants
That gladness you gained
and now enjoy.

Hail, Gate of Heaven,
With glory now crowned,
Bring us to safety
Where thy Son is found,
true joy to see.
Amen. (Alleluia.)
