= Sequence (musical form) =

Chant or hymn sung during celebration of the Eucharist in many Christian denominations

A sequence (Latin: sequentia, plural: sequentiae) is a chant or hymn sung or recited during the liturgical celebration of the Eucharist for many Christian denominations, before the proclamation of the Gospel. By the time of the Council of Trent (1543–1563) there were sequences for many feasts in the Church's year.

The sequence had always been sung directly before the Gospel, after the Alleluia. The 2002 edition of the General Instruction of the Roman Missal, however, reversed the order and places the sequence before the Alleluia.

The form of this chant inspired a genre of Latin poetry written in a non-classical metre, often on a sacred Christian subject, which is also called a sequence.

== The Latin sequence in literature and liturgy ==
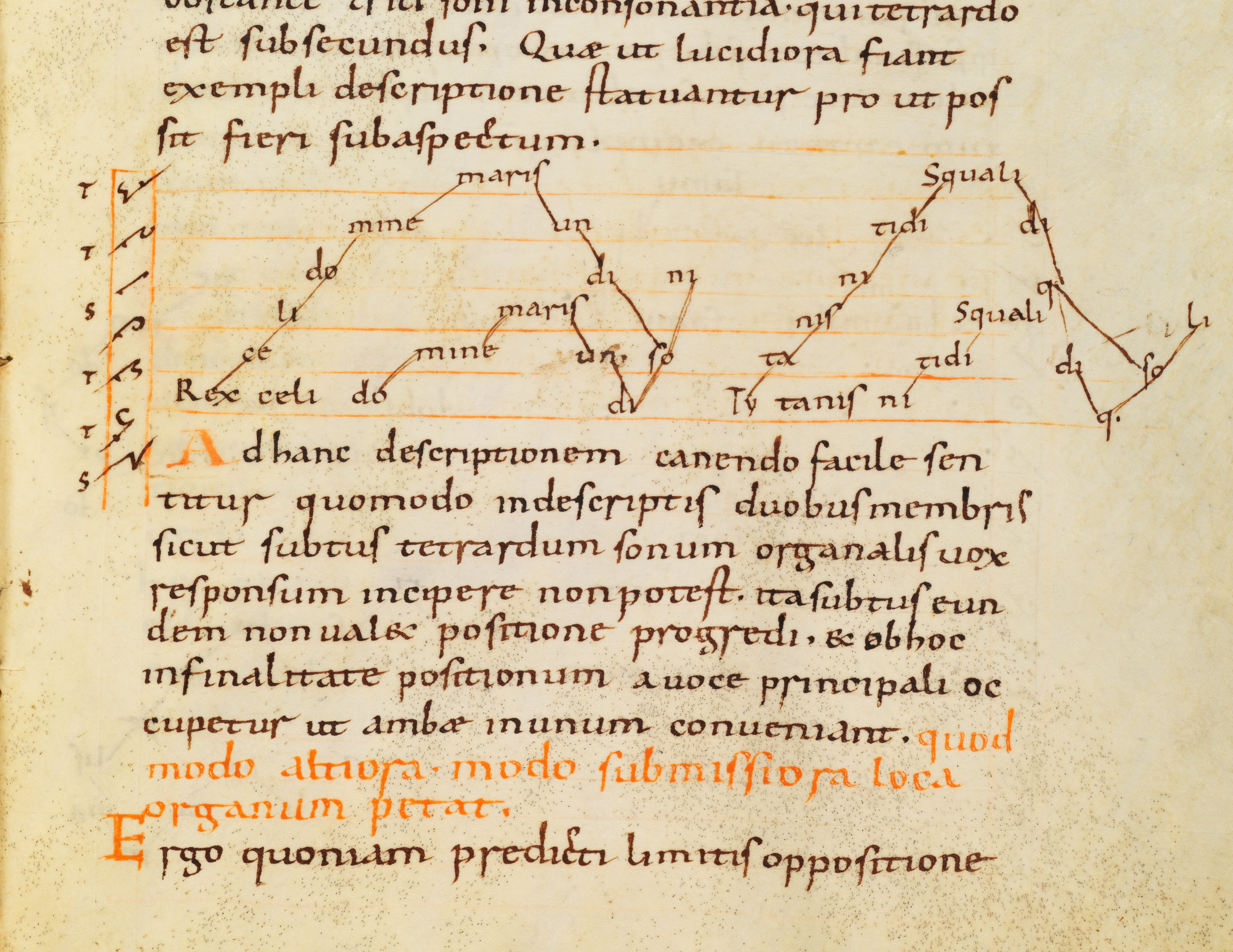
The Rex caeli sequence from the Bamberg Manuscript of the treatise Musica enchiriadis, (2nd half of the 9th century, Germany)

The Latin sequence has its beginnings, as an artistic form, in early Christian hymns such as the Vexilla Regis of Venantius Fortunatus. Venantius modified the classical metres based on syllable quantity to an accentual metre more easily suitable to be chanted to music in Christian worship. In the ninth century, Hrabanus Maurus also moved away from classical metres to produce Christian hymns such as Veni Creator Spiritus.

The name sequentia, on the other hand, came to be bestowed upon these hymns as a result of the works of Notker Balbulus, who popularized the genre in the ninth century by publishing a collection of sequentiae in his Liber Hymnorum. Since early sequences were written in rhythmical prose, they were also called proses (Latin: prosae).

Notker's texts were meant to be sung. In the Latin Mass of the Middle Ages, it became customary to prolong the last syllable of the Alleluia, while the deacon was ascending from the altar to the ambo, to sing or chant the Gospel. This prolonged melisma was called the jubilus, jubilatio, or laudes, because of its jubilant tone. It was also called sequentia, "sequence," because it followed (Latin: sequi) the Alleluia. Notker set words to this melisma in rhythmic prose for chanting as a trope. The name sequence thus came to be applied to these texts; and by extension, to hymns containing rhyme and accentual metre. A collection of sequences was called the Sequentiale.

One well-known sequence, falsely attributed to Notker during the Middle Ages, is the prose text Media vita in morte sumus ("In the midst of life we are in death"), which was translated by Cranmer and became a part of the burial service in the funeral rites of the Anglican Book of Common Prayer. Other well-known sequences include the ninth-century Swan Sequence, Tommaso da Celano's Dies Irae, St. Thomas Aquinas' Pange lingua in praise of the Eucharist, the anonymous medieval hymn Ave maris stella ("Hail, star of the sea!"), and the Marian sequence Stabat Mater by Jacopone da Todi. During the Middle Ages, secular or semi-secular sequences, such as Peter of Blois' Olim sudor Herculis ("The labours of Hercules") were written; the Goliards, a group of Latin poets who wrote mostly satirical verse, used the form extensively. The Carmina Burana is a collection of these sequences.

== Changes since the Council of Trent ==
In the Missal of Pius V (1570) the number of sequences for the entire Roman Rite was reduced to four:

- Victimae paschali laudes (11th century) for Easter,
- Veni Sancte Spiritus for Pentecost (12th century),
- Lauda Sion Salvatorem (c.1264) for Corpus Christi, and
- Dies Irae (13th century) for All Souls and in Masses for the Dead.

In 1727, the 13th century Stabat Mater for Our Lady of Sorrows was added to this list.

In 1970 the Dies Irae was removed from the Requiem Mass of the revised, new Roman Missal and was transferred to the Liturgy of the Hours, to be sung ad libitum in the 34th week of the Ordinary Time before the beginning of Advent, divided into three parts: Office of Readings, Lauds and Vespers. Currently, the Dies Irae is sung in churches where the Tridentine Mass is celebrated.

The Christmas sequence Laetabundus, not present in the Roman Missal, is found in the Dominican Missal. This sequence is permitted for the Third Mass of Christmas, the Epiphany, and Candlemas. The Third Edition of the Roman Missal, which was implemented in the United States in 2010, states that the Sequence is optional except on Easter Sunday and Pentecost Day, and it is sung before the Alleluia.

The sequence, Flos Carmeli, is used in the Carmelite Rite of The Mass on the feasts of Simon Stock and Our Lady of Mount Carmel.

== The sequence as a musical genre ==
Sequences are distinguished by a structure dominated by couplets, in forms of AA'BB'CC'... and ABB'CC'DD'...Z. Although it is commonly understood that sequences fall into early, middle, and late periods, the history of developments in the genre is better thought of as unfolding in layers that overlap. In the early period, sequences such as Notker's often included single lines that were not part of a couplet. These single lines most often appeared at the beginning or end of the sequence, but could also appear in the middle. Sequences from the middle period, starting around the 11th century, such as the sequence for the Mass of Easter Day, Victimae paschali laudes, are less likely to have single lines outside of couplets, and their couplets are more likely to rhyme. By the 12th century, later sequences, such as the sequence for Pentecost, Veni Sancte Spiritus, showed increasing regularity of structure, with rhyming couplets throughout.

Medieval sequences are usually modal melodies. While primarily syllabic, sequences can occasionally have short neumatic moments, but they almost never contain melismas. The two verses of each couplet are sung to the same musical line, usually ending on a tonally stabilizing pitch, with variety being created by couplets of different lengths and with different musical arches. Although sequences are vocal and monophonic, certain sequence texts suggest possible vocal harmonization in organum or instrumental accompaniment.

The composition of sequences became less frequent when Humanist Latin replaced medieval Latin as the preferred literary style in Latin. New sequences continued to be written in Latin; one of the best known later sequences is the Christmas carol Adeste Fideles, known in English as "O Come, All Ye Faithful".
