= Prayer of the Blessed Virgin =

Roman Catholic prayer

The Prayer to Our Lady of Mount Carmel is a prayer in the Roman Catholic Church. It is a part of a novena for prayer beginning on July 7, July 8, and in time of need.

On June 28th 1852, it was given a hundred days indulgence by Cardinal Wiseman, Archbishop of Westminster, in favour of Carmelites and any other Christian believer, which recite three daily prayers during nine consecutive days or Saturdays. Worshippers are pointed to wear the Holy Scapular, make the preparatory acts of faith, hope, charity, contrition.

== Text ==
O most beautiful flower of Mount Carmel,

fruitful vine, splendor of Heaven, Blessed Mother of the Son of God,

Immaculate Virgin, assist me in my necessity.

O Star of the Sea, help me herein and show me here you are my Mother.

O Holy Mary, Mother of God, Queen of Heaven and Earth,

I humbly beseech you from the bottom of my heart to succor me in my necessity. (make request)

There are none that can withstand thy power.

O Mary, conceived without sin,

pray for us who have recourse to thee (three times).

Holy Mary, I place this cause in your hands (three times).

Thankyou for your mercy towards me and my loved ones. Amen.

== See also ==
- Brown Scapular
- The Most Blessed Virgin Mary of Mount Carmel
