= Veni Sancte Spiritus =

Chant in the Roman Liturgy for Pentecost

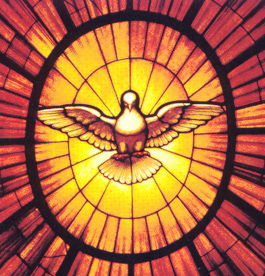
The dove: iconographic symbol of the Holy Spirit

Veni Sancte Spiritus ("Come, Holy Spirit"), sometimes called the "Golden Sequence" (Latin: Sequentia Aurea), is a sequence sung in honour of God the Holy Spirit, prescribed in the Roman Rite for the Masses of Pentecost Sunday. It is usually attributed to either the 13th-century Pope Innocent III, or to the Archbishop of Canterbury, Stephen Langton, among others.

Veni Sancte Spiritus is one of only four medieval sequences which were incorporated into the Liturgy of the Roman Curia – a Roman carryover from the pre-Tridentine Mass celebrated before the standardisations by the Council of Trent (1545–63). It is therefore found in editions of the Roman Missal published in 1570; before the Tridentine Missal, many feasts also had their own sequences. Today, it is still sung or recited at Mass on Pentecost, generally before the Gospel reading.

== Text ==
Original Latin text

Veni, Sancte Spiritus,
et emitte cælitus
lucis tuæ radium.

Veni, pater pauperum,
veni, dator munerum,
veni, lumen cordium.

Consolator optime,
dulcis hospes animæ,
dulce refrigerium.

In labore requies,
in æstu temperies,
in fletu solatium.

O lux beatissima,
reple cordis intima
tuorum fidelium.

Sine tuo numine,
nihil est in homine,
nihil est innoxium.

Lava quod est sordidum,
riga quod est aridum,
sana quod est saucium.

Flecte quod est rigidum,
fove quod est frigidum,
rege quod est devium.

Da tuis fidelibus,
in te confidentibus,
sacrum septenarium.

Da virtutis meritum,
da salutis exitum,
da perenne gaudium.

Literal English translation

Come, Holy Spirit,
and send out from heaven
the ray of your light.

Come, father of the poor,
come, giver of gifts,
come, light of hearts.

Greatest comforter,
sweet guest of the soul,
sweet consolation.

In labour, rest,
in heat, temperateness,
in tears, solace.

O most blessed light,
fill the inmost heart
of your faithful.

Without the nod of your head,
there is nothing in man,
nothing that is harmless.

Cleanse what is unclean,
water what is parched,
heal what is wounded.

Bend what is inflexible,
warm what is chilled,
correct what has gone astray.

Give to your faithful,
who trust in you,
the sevenfold gift.

Give virtue's reward,
give salvation's end,
give joy eternal.

ICEL English translation

Holy Spirit, Lord of light,
From Thy clear celestial height
Thy pure beaming radiance give.

Come, Thou Father of the poor,
Come with treasures which endure,
Come, Thou Light of all that live.

Thou, of all consolers best,
Thou, the soul’s delightsome Guest,
Dost refreshing peace bestow.

Thou in toil art comfort sweet,
Pleasant coolness in the heat,
Solace in the midst of woe.

Light immortal, Light divine,
Visit Thou these hearts of Thine,
And our inmost being fill.

If Thou take Thy grace away,
Nothing pure in man will stay;
All his good is turned to ill.

Heal our wounds; our strength renew;
On our dryness pour Thy dew;
Wash the stains of guilt away.

Bend the stubborn heart and will;
Melt the frozen, warm the chill;
Guide the steps that go astray.

Thou, on those who evermore
Thee confess and Thee adore,
In Thy sevenfold gifts descend:

Give them comfort when they die,
Give them life with Thee on high;
Give them joys that never end.

J. M. Neale's translation

Come, Thou holy Paraclete,
And from Thy celestial seat
Send Thy light and brilliancy:

Father of the poor, draw near;
Giver of all gifts, be here;
Come, the soul’s true radiancy.

Come, of comforters the best,
Of the soul the sweetest guest,
Come in toil refreshingly:

Thou in labour rest most sweet,
Thou art shadow from the heat,
Comfort in adversity.

O Thou Light, most pure and blest,
Shine within the inmost breast
Of Thy faithful company.

Where Thou art not, man hath nought;
Every holy deed and thought
Comes from Thy divinity.

What is soilèd, make Thou pure;
What is wounded, work its cure;
What is parchèd, fructify;

What is rigid, gently bend;
What is frozen, warmly tend;
Strengthen what goes erringly.

Fill Thy faithful, who confide
In Thy power to guard and guide,
With Thy sevenfold mystery.

Here Thy grace and virtue send:
Grant salvation to the end,
And in Heav’n felicity.

== Indulgence ==
The 2004 Enchiridion Indulgentiarum grants a partial indulgence to those who recite the sequence at sunrise or sunset; at the beginning or conclusion of one's workday; and before or after meals.

== Musical settings ==
Veni Sancte Spiritus: Gregorian chant

The sequence was set to music by a number of composers, especially during the Renaissance, including Dufay, Josquin, Willaert, Palestrina, John Dunstaple, Lassus, Victoria, and Byrd. Marc-Antoine Charpentier wrote two settings, H.364, H.364 a, for 3 voices and bc (1690s) and H.366 for 3 voices and bc (1690s). Later composers who have set the text include Arvo Pärt, Morten Lauridsen, Frank La Rocca, George Fenton, and Samuel Webbe.
