= Our Lady of Mount Carmel =

Title for the Virgin Mary

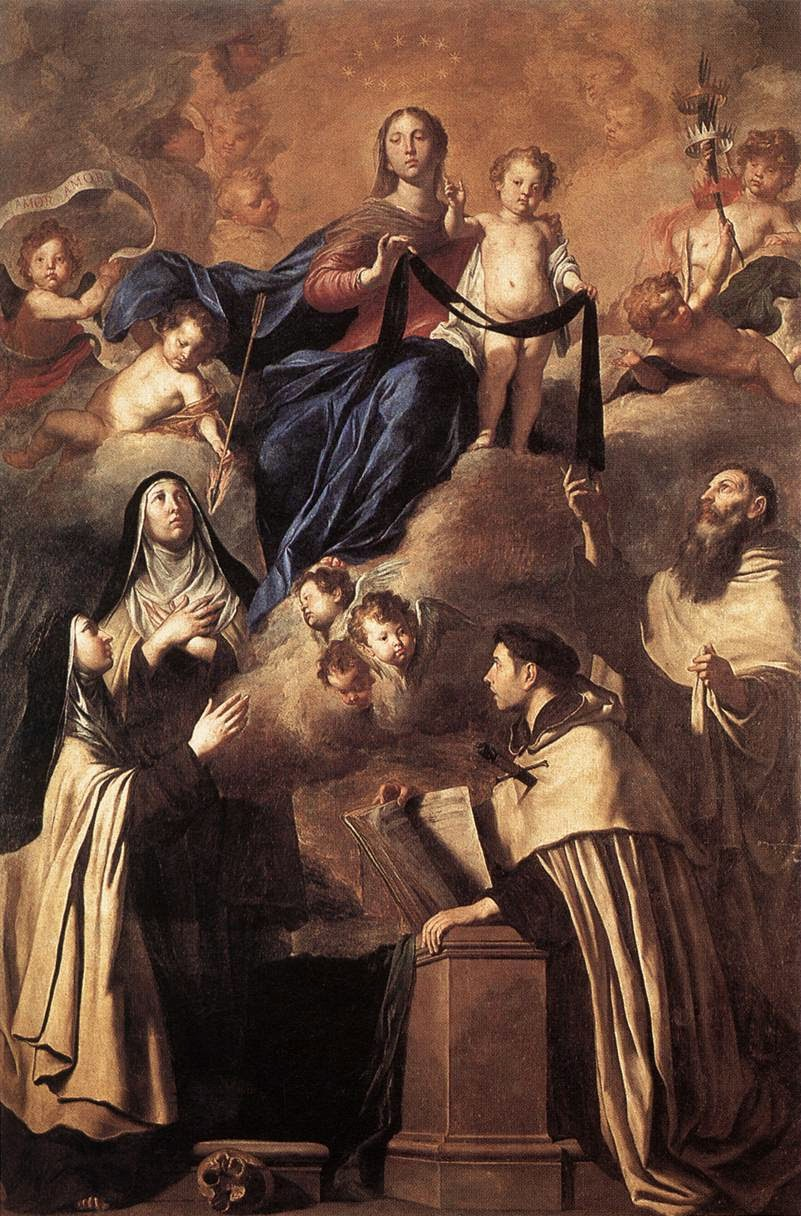
- Our Lady of Mount Carmel by Pietro Novelli, 1641
- Approval: 30 January 1226, during the pontificate of Pope Honorius III; 1587, during the pontificate of Pope Sixtus V
- Patronage: Carmelites, protection from harm, protection from dangerous situations, deliverance from purgatory, sailors, fishermen, some navy and army forces, Chile, Bolivia, Catemaco, Chilaw, Sri Lanka, Aylesford, Roraima, Birkirkara, Jaboticabal, Valletta, Pernambuco, Villalba, Hatillo, Higuerote, Carlopoli
- Feast day: 16 July

Our Lady of Mount Carmel, or Virgin of Carmel, is a Catholic title of the Blessed Virgin Mary venerated as patroness of the Carmelites of the Ancient Observance and the Discalced Carmelites.

The first Carmelites were hermits living on Mount Carmel in the Holy Land during the late 12th and early to mid-13th centuries. They built in the midst of their hermitages a chapel which they dedicated to the Blessed Virgin, whom they conceived of in chivalric terms as the "Lady of the place." Our Lady of Mount Carmel was adopted in the 19th century as the patron saint of Chile.

Since the 15th century, popular devotion to Our Lady of Mount Carmel has centred on the Scapular of Our Lady of Mount Carmel, also known as the Brown Scapular. Traditionally, Mary is said to have given the Scapular to the Carmelite Simon Stock (1165–1265). The liturgical feast of Our Lady of Mount Carmel is celebrated on 16 July.

The liturgical feast of Our Lady of Mount Carmel was probably first celebrated in England in the later part of the 14th century. Its object was thanksgiving to Mary, the patroness of the Carmelite order, for the benefits she had accorded to it through its difficult early years. The institution of the feast may have come in the wake of the vindication of their name, Brothers of the Blessed Virgin Mary, at Cambridge, England, in 1374. The date chosen was 17 July; on the European mainland this date conflicted with the feast of Saint Alexis, requiring a shift to 16 July, which remains the Feast of Our Lady of Mount Carmel on the General Roman Calendar. The Latin poem Flos Carmeli ("Flower of Carmel") first appears as the sequence for this Mass. Traditionally, the feast is a preferred occasion for receiving the Brown Scapular.

== Origin of the devotion ==
The name of Mount Carmel comes from Karm-El (Hebrew for garden or vine of God). Mount Carmel can be found in Israel, between the Mediterranean sea and the vale of Jezreel. It appears in the book of Isaiah 35:2, as a beautiful place. The prophet Elias, lived around Carmelo. In this place, Elias demonstrated the power of The Lord to the pagans of Baal.

== History ==
The Carmelites were the only religious order whose origins lie in the Crusader States. In the 13th century, some of its people migrated west to England, setting up a chapter and being documented there about 1241–1242. A tradition first attested to in the late 14th century says that Simon Stock, believed to be an early English prior general of the Carmelite order soon after its migration to England, had a vision of the Blessed Virgin Mary in which she gave him the Brown scapular. This formed part of the Carmelite habit after 1287. In Stock's vision, Mary promised that those who died wearing the scapular would be saved. This is a devotional sacramental signifying the wearer's consecration to Mary and affiliation with the Carmelite order. It symbolizes her special protection and calls the wearers to consecrate themselves to her in a special way.

In 1642, the Carmelite friar John Cheron published a document which he said was a 13th-century letter written by Simon Stock's secretary, Peter Swanington. Since the early 20th century, historians have concluded that this letter was forged, likely by Cheron himself.

But Stock's vision was long embraced by many promoters of the scapular devotion. The forged Swanington letter claimed that 16 July 1251 was the date of the vision (16 July being the date of the Feast of Our Lady of Mount Carmel), which led for centuries to a strong association between this feast day and the scapular devotion. Based on available historical documentation, the liturgical feast of Our Lady of Mount Carmel did not originally have a specific association with the Brown scapular or the tradition of Stock's vision of the Blessed Virgin Mary. This tradition grew gradually, as did the liturgical cult of Saint Simon. The latter has been documented in Bordeaux, where Stock died, from the year 1435; in Ireland and England, from 1458; and in the rest of the order, from 1564. Historians have long questioned whether Stock had the vision of Mary and the scapular. Although Simon Stock was never officially canonized, his feast day was celebrated in the church. The Carmelite convent of Aylesford, England, was restored and a relic of Saint Simon Stock was placed there in 1951. The saint's feast is celebrated in the places dedicated to him.

Also associated with Our Lady of Carmel was a papal bull saying that there was a Sabbatine privilege associated with devotion to the saint; that is, until the late 1970s, the Catholic liturgy for that day mentioned the scapular devotion. Vatican II resorted to scrutiny of the Feast of Our Lady of Mount Carmel, as well as that of Simon Stock, because of the historical uncertainties about the origins. The liturgies were revised and, in the 21st century, neither, even in the Carmelite proper, makes reference to the scapular.

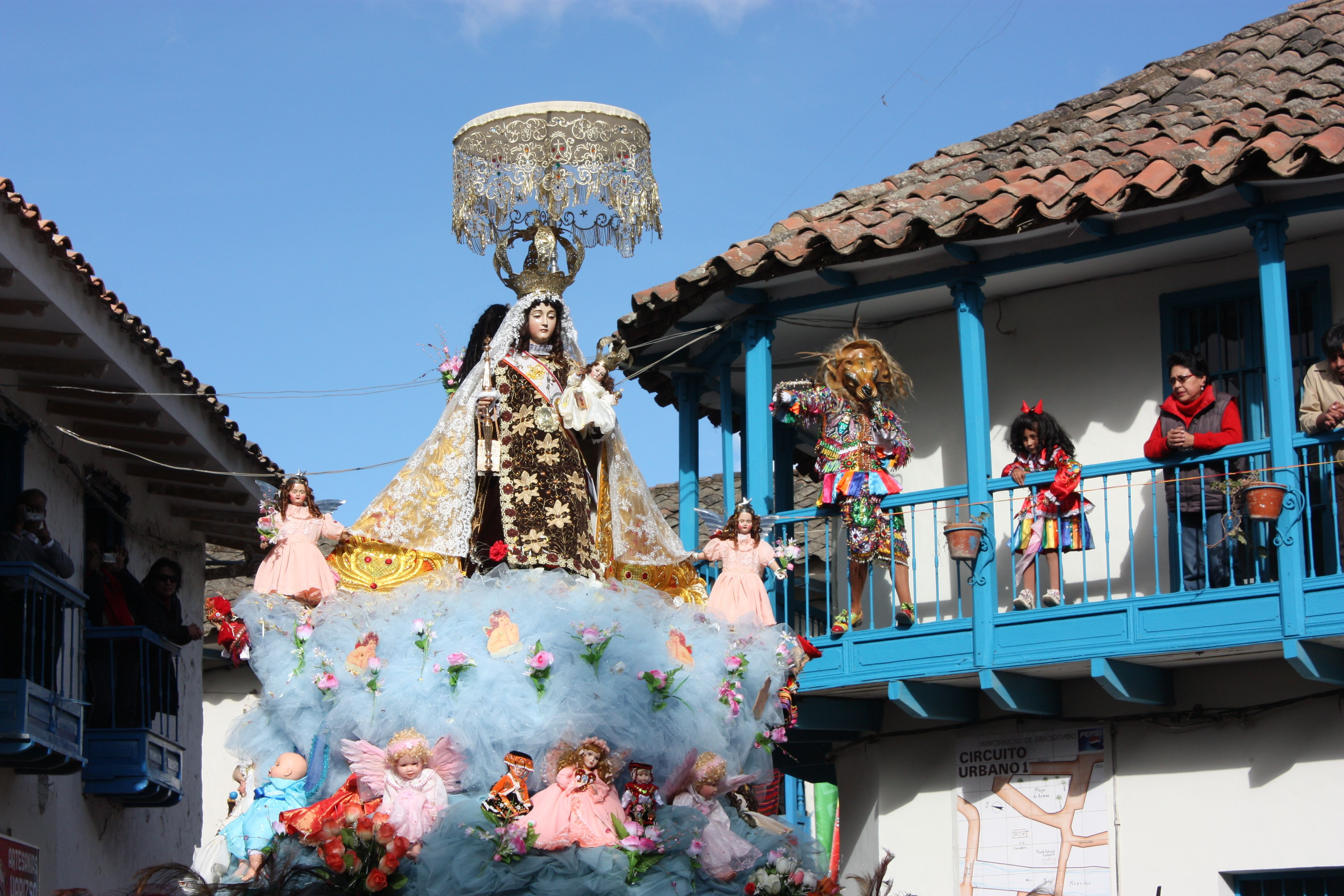
A saqra (animal figure) dancer watching the procession of Mamacha Carmen from a balcony

In Spain and other Spanish-speaking countries, there has been particular devotion to Our Lady of Mount Carmel, who has been adopted as a patron saint of several places, as she has been in other Catholic-majority countries. In addition, Carmen and María del Carmen have been popular given names for girls in Spanish-speaking countries. An annual festival, known as Mamacha Carmen, is held in the highland Paucartambo District, Peru, featuring a procession with the Virgin and traditional dancers. Veneration of the Virgen del Carmen (often also associated with the Stella Maris) is particularly strong in coastal towns of Spain.

The feast day of Our Lady of Mount Carmel is celebrated for ten days each July in the Williamsburg neighborhood of Brooklyn, New York, where an approximately sixty-five foot tall "giglio" – a tower with a statue of Our Lady of Mount Carmel affixed atop it – is lifted and paraded on multiple dates during the festival. The festival culminates with the celebration of the liturgical feast of Our Lady on July 16.

In the Bronx neighborhood of Belmont (Little Italy), a procession is held on 187th street, where the parish church of Our Lady of Mount Carmel is located.

In the town of Hammonton, New Jersey, the feast is commemorated each year with a week long festival culminating with a parade of saints on the sixteenth. Celebration of the feast has been ongoing since 1875 and is widely recognized as the longest running Italian American festival in the United States.

== Carmelite devotion ==
The Carmelites consider the Blessed Virgin Mary to be a perfect model of the interior life of prayer and contemplation to which Carmelites aspire, as well as a model of virtue, in the person who was closest in life to Jesus Christ. She is seen as the one who points Christians most surely to Christ. As she says to the servants at the wedding at Cana, "Do whatever he [Jesus] tells you." Carmelites look to the Virgin Mary as a Spiritual Mother. The Stella Maris Monastery (Star of the Sea) on Mount Carmel, named after a traditional title of the Blessed Virgin Mary, is considered the spiritual headquarters of the order.

Gabriel of St. Mary Magdalene de' Pazzi, a revered authority on Carmelite spirituality, wrote that devotion to Our Lady of Mount Carmel means:

a special call to the interior life, which is preeminently a Marian life. Our Lady wants us to resemble her not only in our outward vesture but, far more, in heart and spirit. If we gaze into Mary's soul, we shall see that grace in her has flowered into a spiritual life of incalculable wealth: a life of recollection, prayer, uninterrupted oblation to God, continual contact, and intimate union with him. Mary's soul is a sanctuary reserved for God alone, where no human creature has ever left its trace, where love and zeal for the glory of God and the salvation of mankind reign supreme. [...] Those who want to live their devotion to Our Lady of Mt. Carmel to the full must follow Mary into the depths of her interior life. Carmel is the symbol of the contemplative life, the life wholly dedicated to the quest for God, wholly orientated towards intimacy with God; and the one who has best realized this highest of ideals is Our Lady herself, "Queen and Splendor of Carmel".

Devotees the Blessed Mother of Mount Carmel might raise petitions to her through the prayer:

O most beautiful flower of Mt. Carmel, fruitful vine, splendor of Heaven, Blessed Mother of the Son of God, Immaculate Virgin, assist me in my necessity. O Star of the Sea, help me and show me you are my Mother. O Holy Mary, Mother of God, Queen of Heaven and earth, I humbly beseech you from the bottom of my heart to succor me in this necessity (make request). There are none that can withstand your power. O Mary, conceived without sin, pray for us who have recourse to thee. Sweet Mother I place this cause in your hands. Amen.

== Devotion in Europe ==
Spain is one of the places where this devotion is most rooted. Our Lady of Mount Carmel is patron of the sailors, which includes fishermen and merchants. On the 19th of April 1901, the regent María Cristina de Habsburgo and the minister of Marina Cristóbal Colón de la Cerda, duke of Veragua, signed the Real Orden (order) in which the Lady of Mount Carmel (Santísima Virgen del Carmen) was proclaimed as patron of the Spanish Army.

In the general chapter of London (1254), the Carmelites were ordered to confer in Spain, thus in 1270, the first founding of some of the most important cities in Aragón took place. Their initiatives were supported by monarchs such as James I (1213-1276) or his nephew James II. In Castilla (Castile), the first foundation was seen in Valladolid, in the convent of Saint Pablo of the Moraleja (1315). The subsequent propagation of the Carmelites was rapid along the whole Iberian peninsula, reaching Seville in 1358, a city in which since then saw the subsequent creation of the province Bética Carmelitian in 1499. During this era, the first woman communities of religious Carmelites emerged. During the XVI century, Teresa of Ávila and John of the Cross introduced profound reforms in the senate of the order. This gave origin to the Discalced Carmelites. Despite this division, in the following centuries their spiritual path continued along the world.

Most cities and villages in Spain practically participate in a religious manner toward Our Lady of Mount Carmel, where processions and maritime pilgrimages using her image take part every 16 of July. In Granada, Benalúa, She is the patron. In this town there are celebrations in her name for maritime events, and every 16 July her image too is portrayed along the streets.

In Cordoba, there are two devotions with this advocacy: Our Lady of Mount Carmel in San Cayetano and in Puerta Nueva. San Cayetano was founded by frail Carmelites around 1600 in the Conventual Church of San Cayetano. The image of the Virgin us by an unknown author, around the XVIII century, attributed to Alonso Gómez de Sandoval. In Puerta Nueva, a great devotion can also be found.

== Church teaching ==
A 1996 doctrinal statement approved by the Congregation for Divine Worship and the Discipline of the Sacraments states that

Devotion to Our Lady of Mount Carmel is bound to the history and spiritual values of the Order of the Brothers of the Blessed Virgin Mary of Mount Carmel and is expressed through the scapular. Thus, whoever receives the scapular becomes a member of the order and pledges him/herself to live according to its spirituality in accordance with the characteristics of his/her state in life.

Discalced Carmelite Kieran Kavanaugh summarizes this spirituality:

The scapular is a Marian habit or garment. It is both a sign and pledge. A sign of belonging to Mary; a pledge of her motherly protection, not only in this life but after death. As a sign, it is a conventional sign signifying three elements strictly joined: first, belonging to a religious family particularly devoted to Mary, especially dear to Mary, the Carmelite order; second, consecration to Mary, devotion to and trust in her Immaculate Heart; third, an urge to become like Mary by imitating her virtues, above all her humility, chastity, and spirit of prayer.

== Association with Purgatory ==
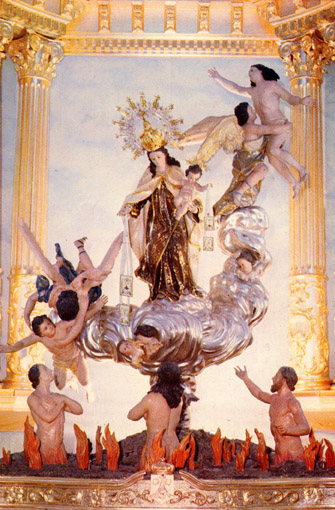
Our Lady of Mount Carmel with angels and souls in Purgatory. Baroque sculpture from Beniaján (Spain).

Since the Middle Ages, Our Lady of Mount Carmel has been related to Purgatory and purgation from sins after death. In some images, she is portrayed as accompanied with angels and persons wearing Brown scapulars, who plead for her mediation. In 1613, the Church forbade images to be made of Our Lady of Mt. Carmel descending into purgatory, due to errors being preached about certain privileges associated with the Brown scapular (known as "the Sabbatine Privilege").

That privilege appears in the noted Decree of the Holy Office (1613). It was inserted in its entirety (except for the words forbidding the painting of the pictures) into the list of the indulgences and privileges of the Confraternity of the Scapular of Mount Carmel. In the 21st century, the Carmelites do not promote the Sabbatine Privilege. They encourage a belief in Mary's general aid and prayerful assistance for persons beyond death, especially her aid to those who devoutly wear the Brown scapular, and commend devotion to Mary especially on Saturdays, which are dedicated to her.

== Apparitions ==
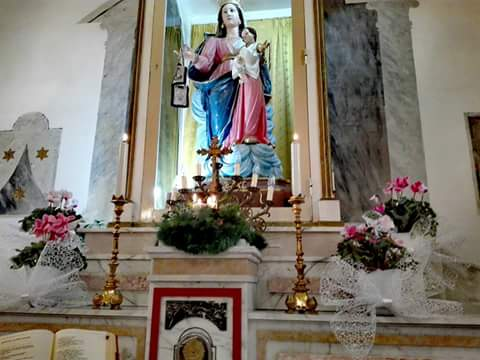
Sanctuary of Our Lady of Mount Carmel at Acquafondata

There is a small sanctuary at Acquafondata, Italy, where the Virgin of Mount Carmel reportedly appeared on 16 July 1841.

The visionaries of Our Lady of Fátima in 1917 reported Our Lady of Mount Carmel as among the titles claimed by Mary. According to Lúcia dos Santos, in the last apparition the Mother of God appeared as Our Lady of Mount Carmel "because Our Lady wants all to wear the scapular".

Between 1961 and 1965, four young girls reported visions of the Virgin Mary, who appeared as Our Lady of Mount Carmel holding the Brown Scapular in the mountain village of San Sebastián de Garabandal, Spain.

== La Bruna ==
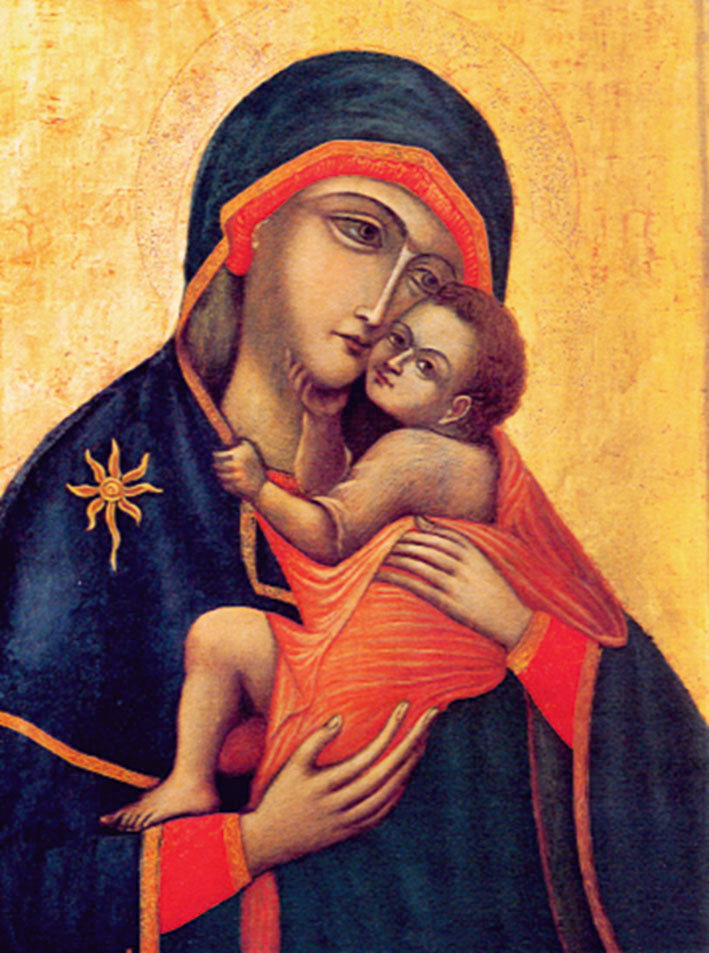
La Bruna, the oldest image of Our Lady of Mount Carmel

La Bruna is an Eleusa icon of the Mother of God regarded as the oldest image of Our Lady of Mount Carmel venerated by the Carmelite Order. It came to be known as La Bruna (The Brown One) because of the dark skin tone of the Mother and Child. The icon was kept on Mount Carmel until the 13th century, when the Carmelites fled due to the Islamic invasion of the Holy Land. The image was brought with them to Naples and began working many miracles. The icon is enshrined above the main altar of the basilica of Santa Maria del Carmine in Naples, Italy. The image was crowned on 11 July 1875.

== Miracles ==
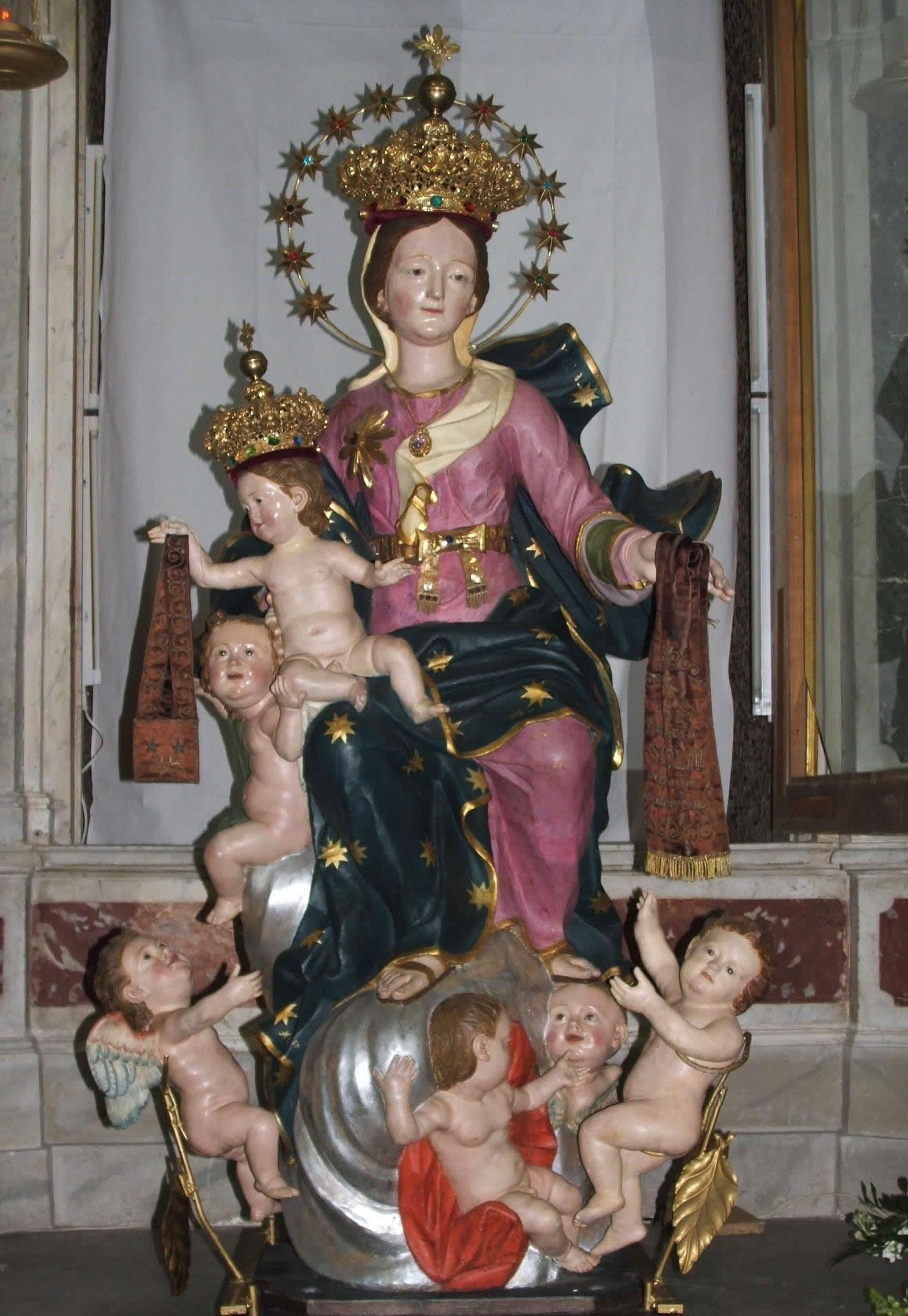
Our Lady of Mount Carmel, Palmi

In Palmi, Calabria, the anniversary of the earthquake of 1894 is observed annually on 16 November. The earthquake had its epicenter in the city. An associated event has been classified as the "miracle of Our Lady of Mount Carmel." For 17 days preceding this earthquake, many of the faithful had reported strange eye movements and changes in the coloring of the face in a statue of Our Lady of Mount Carmel. The local and national press reported these occurrences.

In the evening of 16 November, the faithful improvised a procession carrying the statue of Our Lady of Mount Carmel on their shoulders through the streets. When the procession reached the end of the city, a violent earthquake shook the whole district of Palmi, ruining most of the old houses along the way. But, only nine people died out of a population of about 15,000 inhabitants, as almost all of the population had been on the street to watch the procession and were not trapped inside the destroyed buildings. Therefore, the city commemorates the 1894 procession each year, accompanied by firecrackers, lights, and festive stalls.

The Catholic Church has officially recognized the miracle. On 16 November 1896, the statue of the Blessed Virgin was crowned, based on the decree issued 22 September 1895, by the Vatican Chapter.

== Patronages ==
In Spain, Puerto Rico Costa Rica and Mexico Our Lady of Mount Carmel is venerated as the patroness of the sea. In the Dominican Republic, there are some traditions surrounding the celebration on the day of Our Lady of Mount Carmel. She is considered the patroness of the Spanish Navy, the queen and patroness of Chile, Chile's armed forces and of the Carabineros de Chile. In Colombia, she is the patroness of the National police force. In Bolivia, she is the patroness of the nation and the Armed forces. In Venezuela, she is the patron of the army and drivers. Additionally, she was the patron of the Army of the Andes.

In Peru, she is the patron of Criollism and the perpetual mayor figure in Lima.

== Peace movement ==
The first atomic bomb was exploded in the United States at the Trinity test site on 16 July 1945, near Alamogordo, New Mexico. The Catholic anti-war movement has built on the coincidence between this date and the Feast of Our Lady of Mount Carmel. In 1990 the Rev. Emmanuel Charles McCarthy, a priest of the Eastern Rite (Byzantine-Melkite) of the Catholic Church, initiated the "16 July Twenty-Four Hours Day of Prayer," for forgiveness and protection from Our Lady of Mount Carmel, at Trinity Site in the New Mexico desert. Each year on 16 July, a prayer vigil is conducted at the Trinity site to pray for peace and the elimination of nuclear weapons.

== Gallery of statues ==
Statues of Our Lady of Mount Carmel usually depict her with a Brown scapular

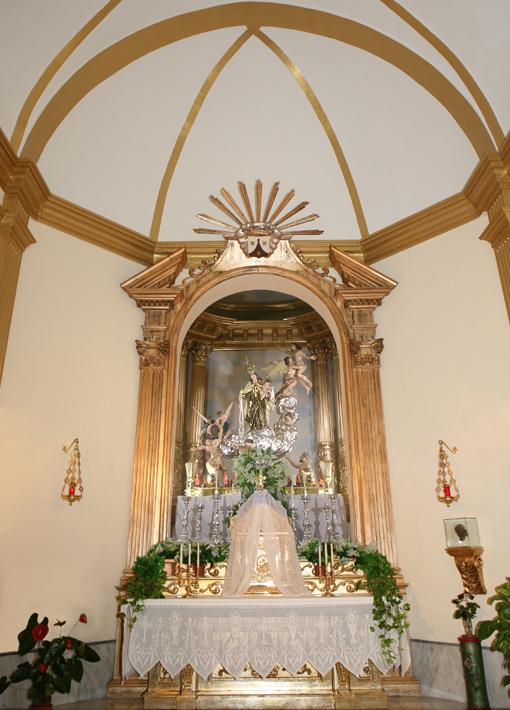
Beniaján, Spain

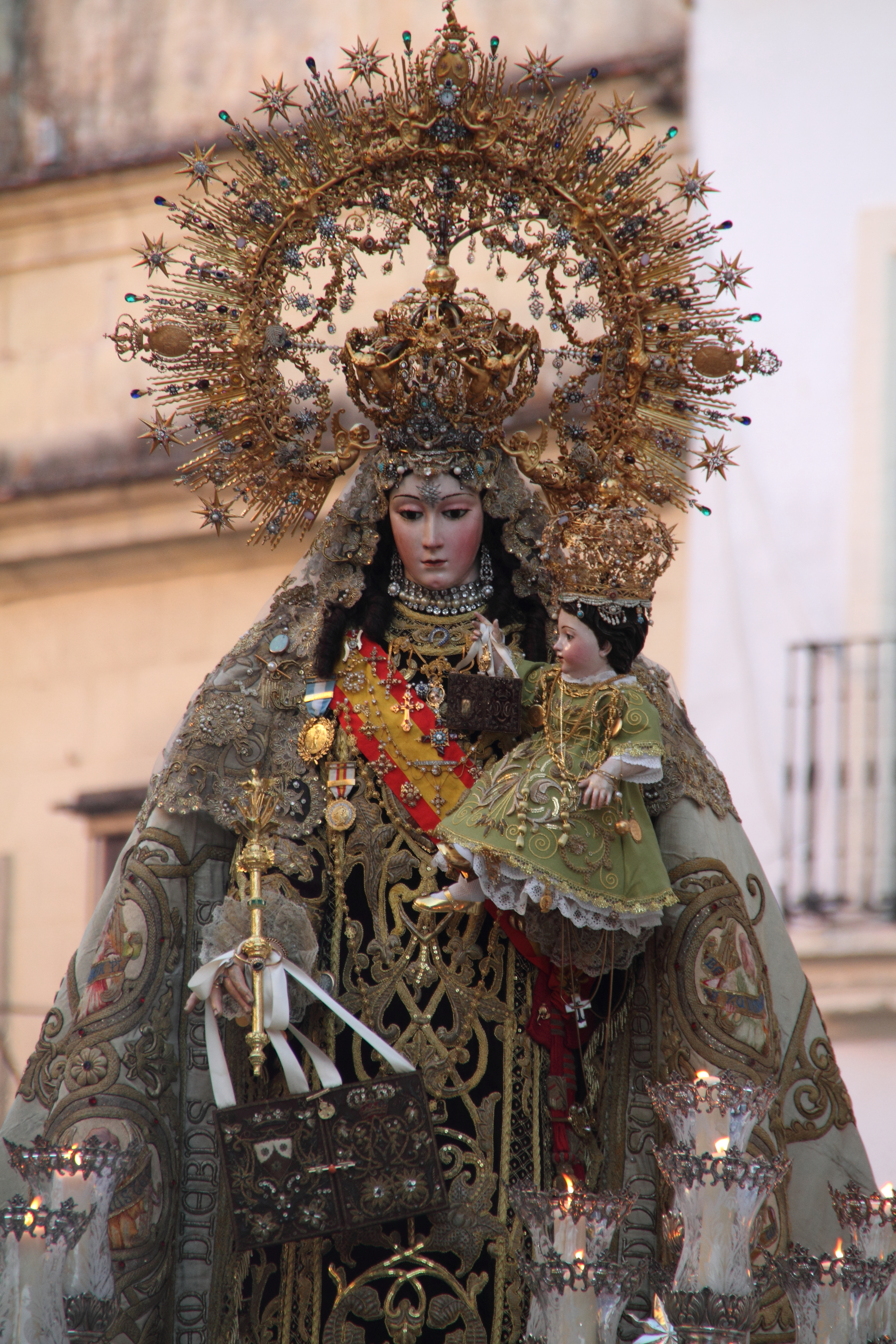
Jerez de la Frontera, Spain

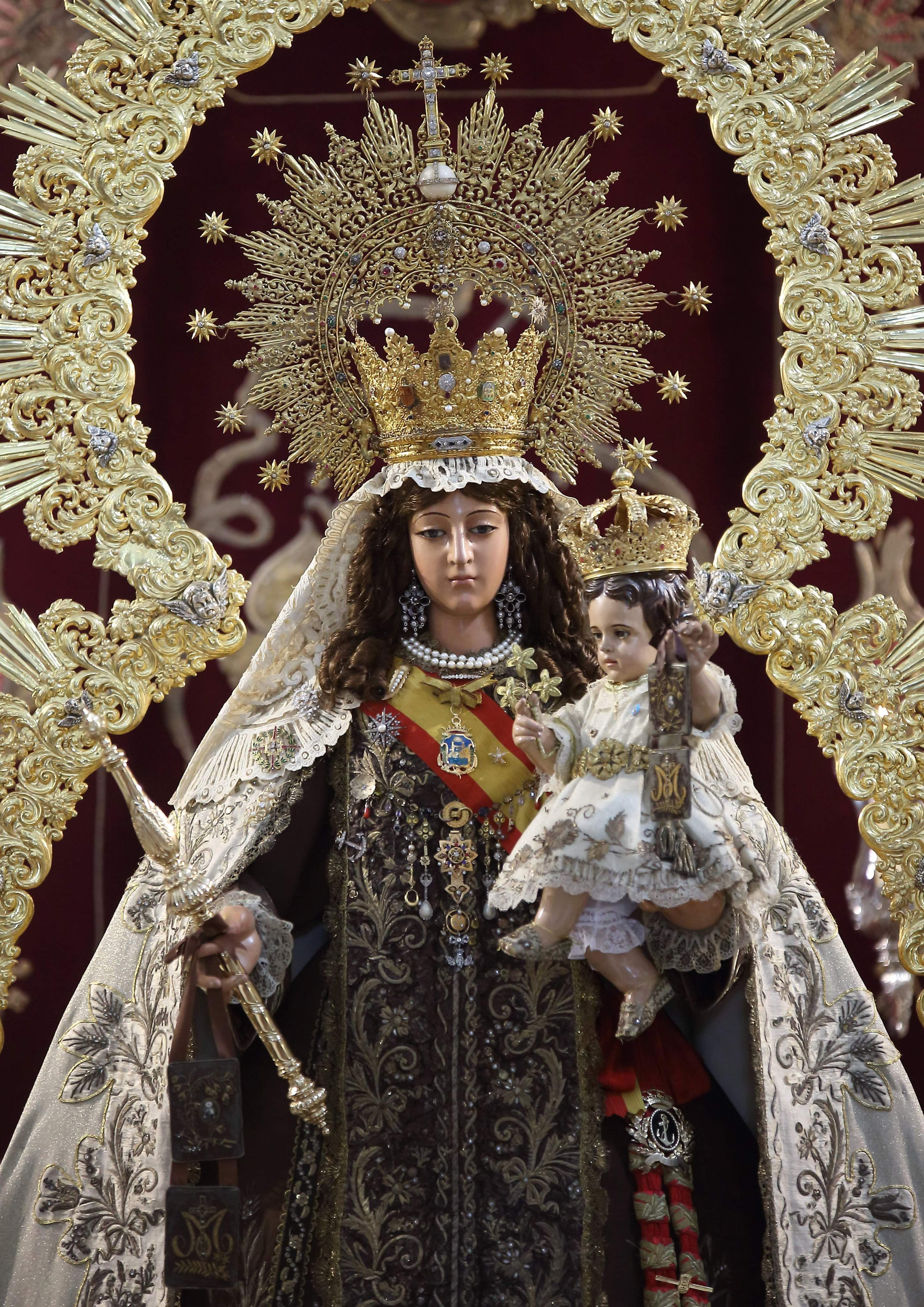
San Fernando, Spain

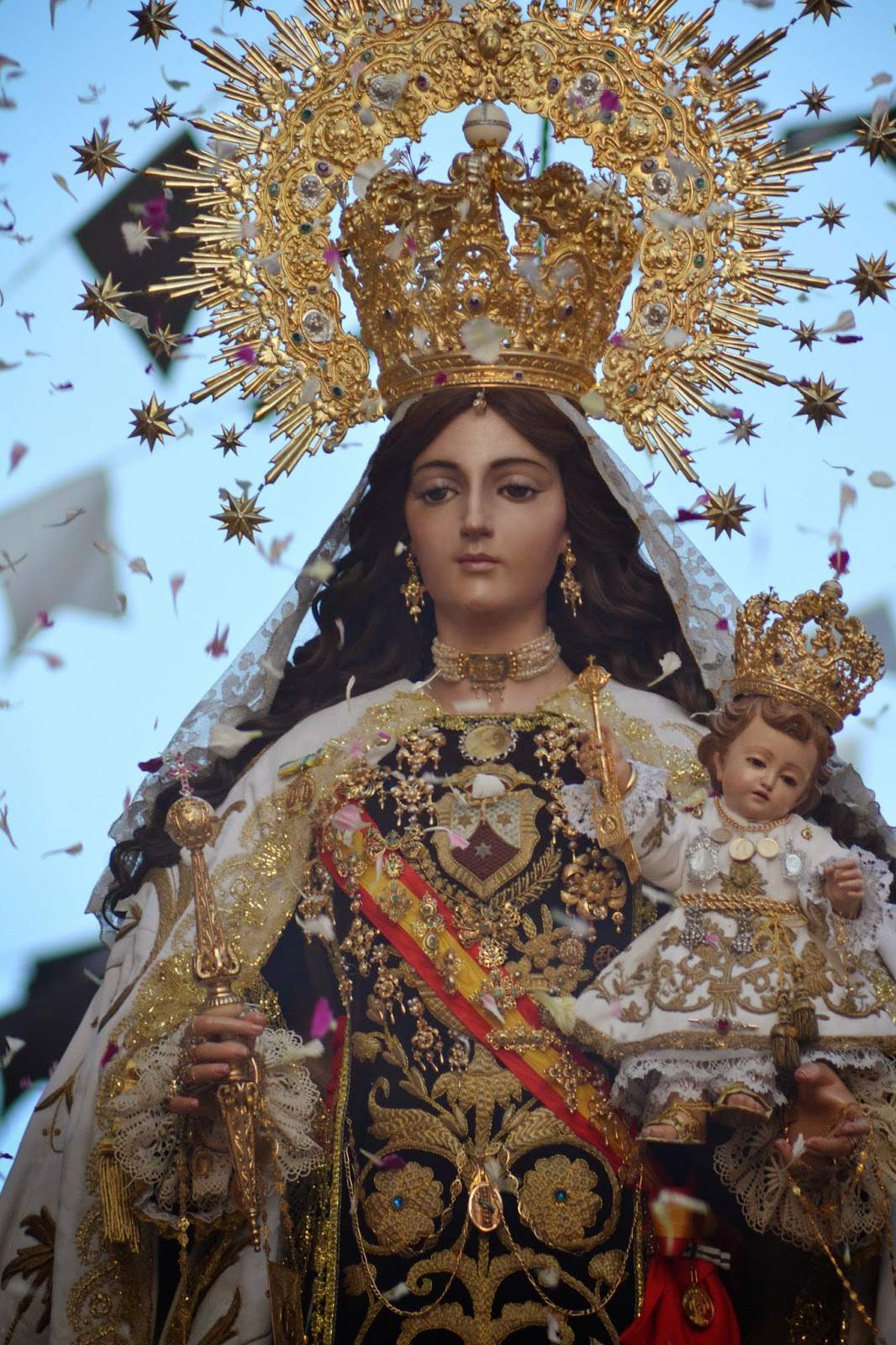
Rute, Spain

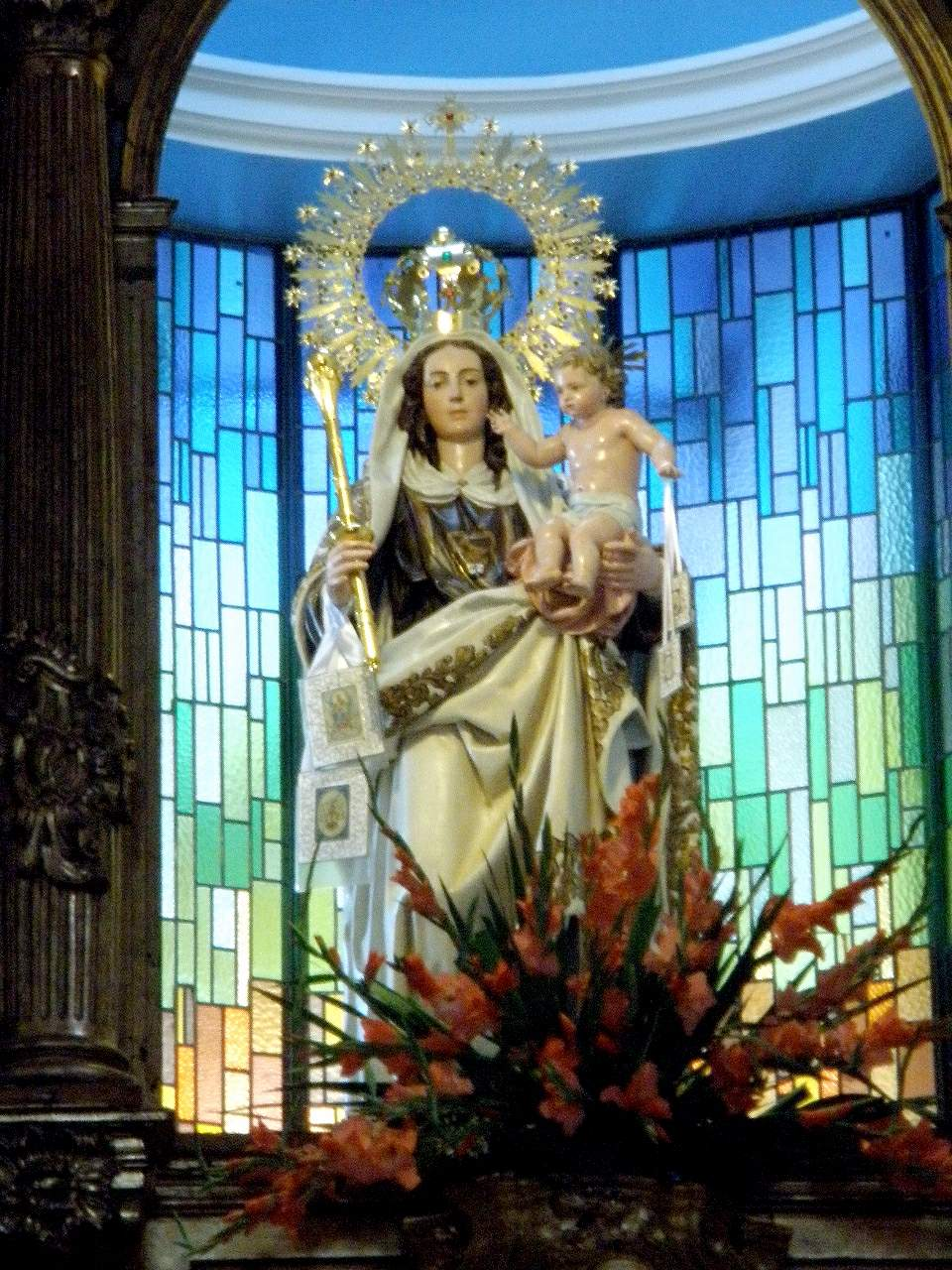
El Burgo de Osma, Spain

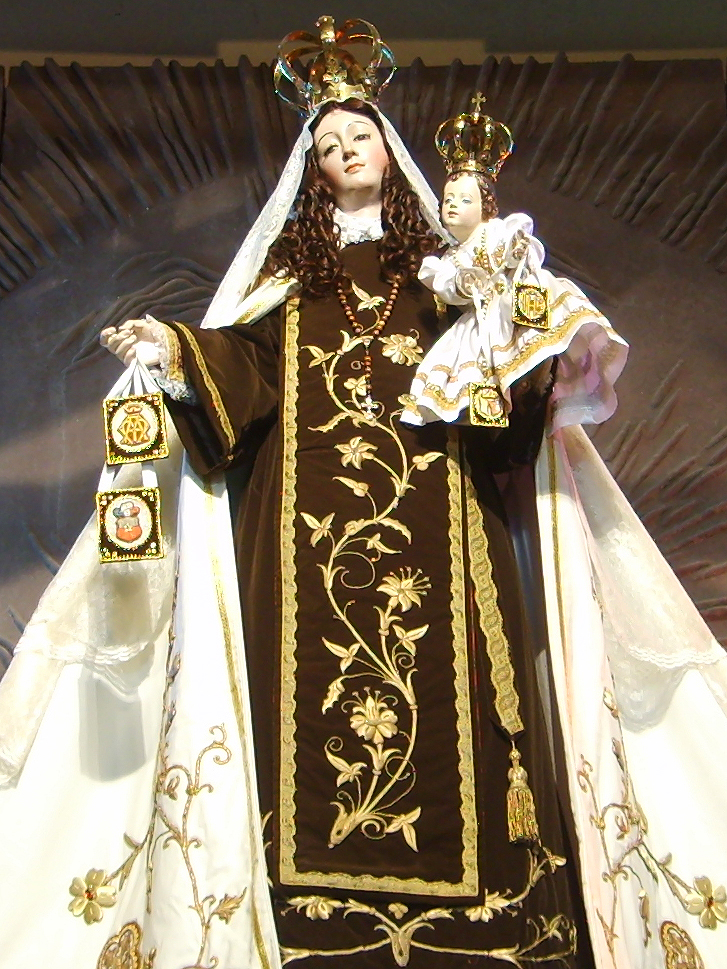
Chile

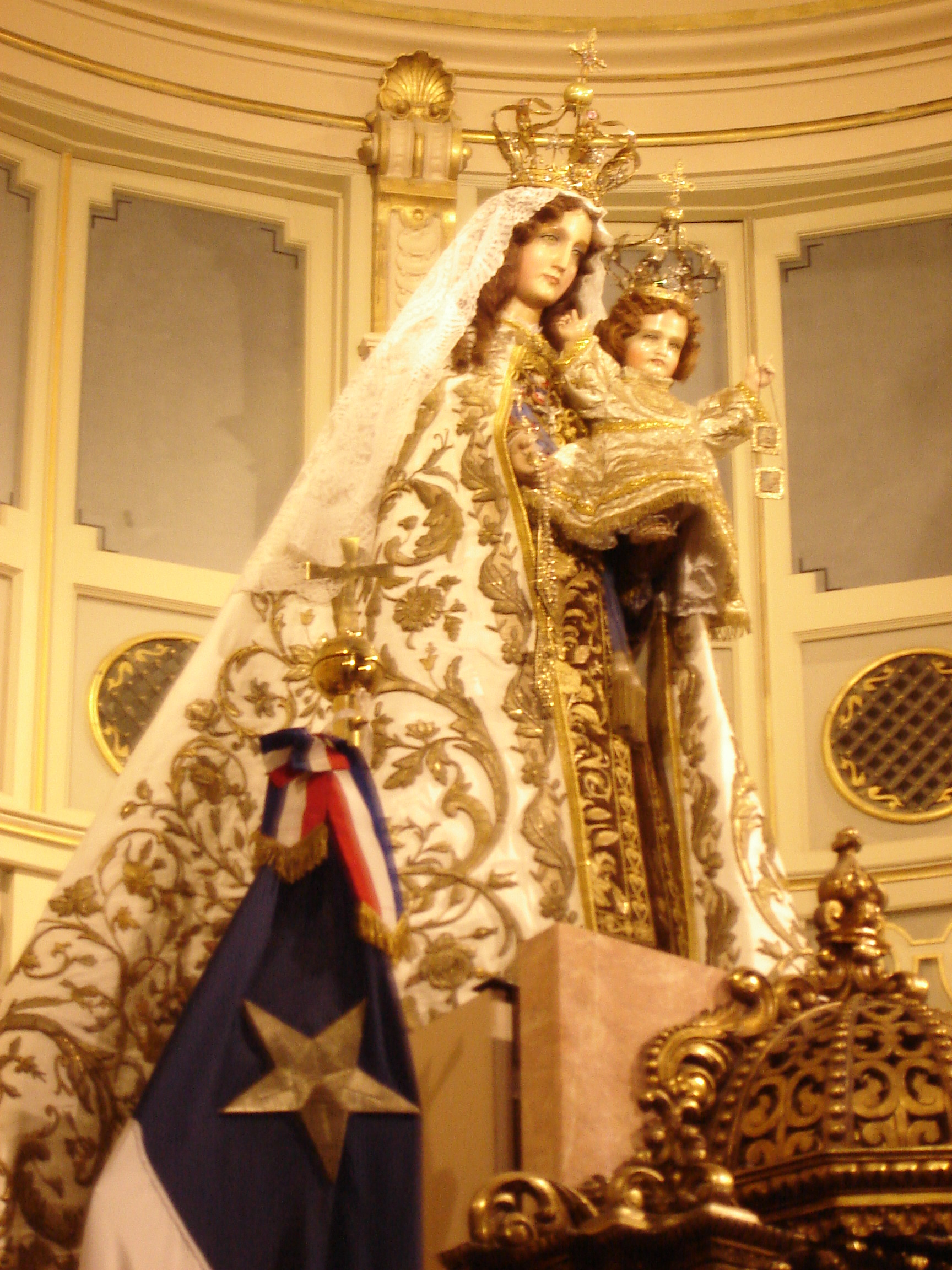
Chile

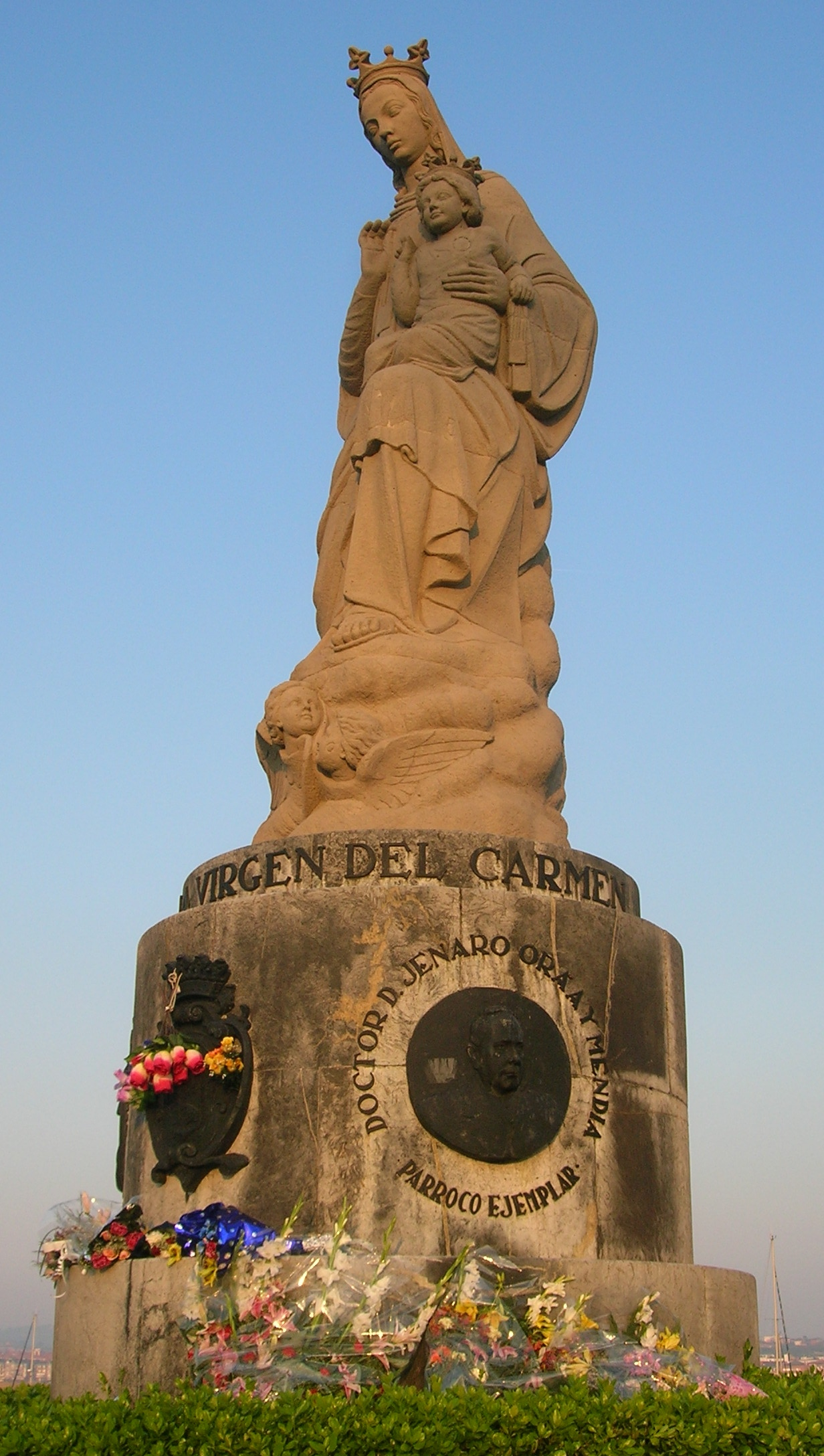
Biscay, Spain

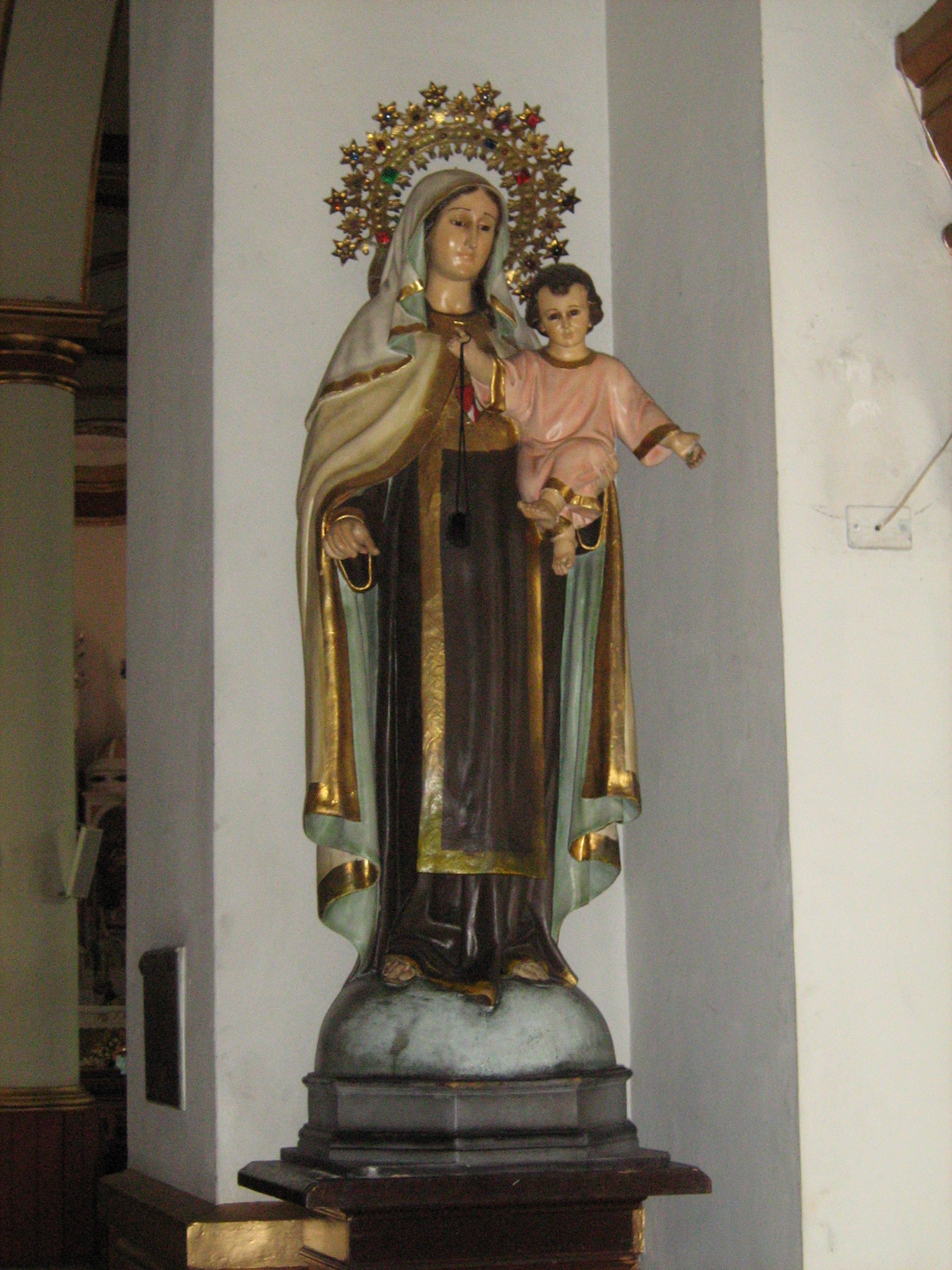
Medellín, Colombia

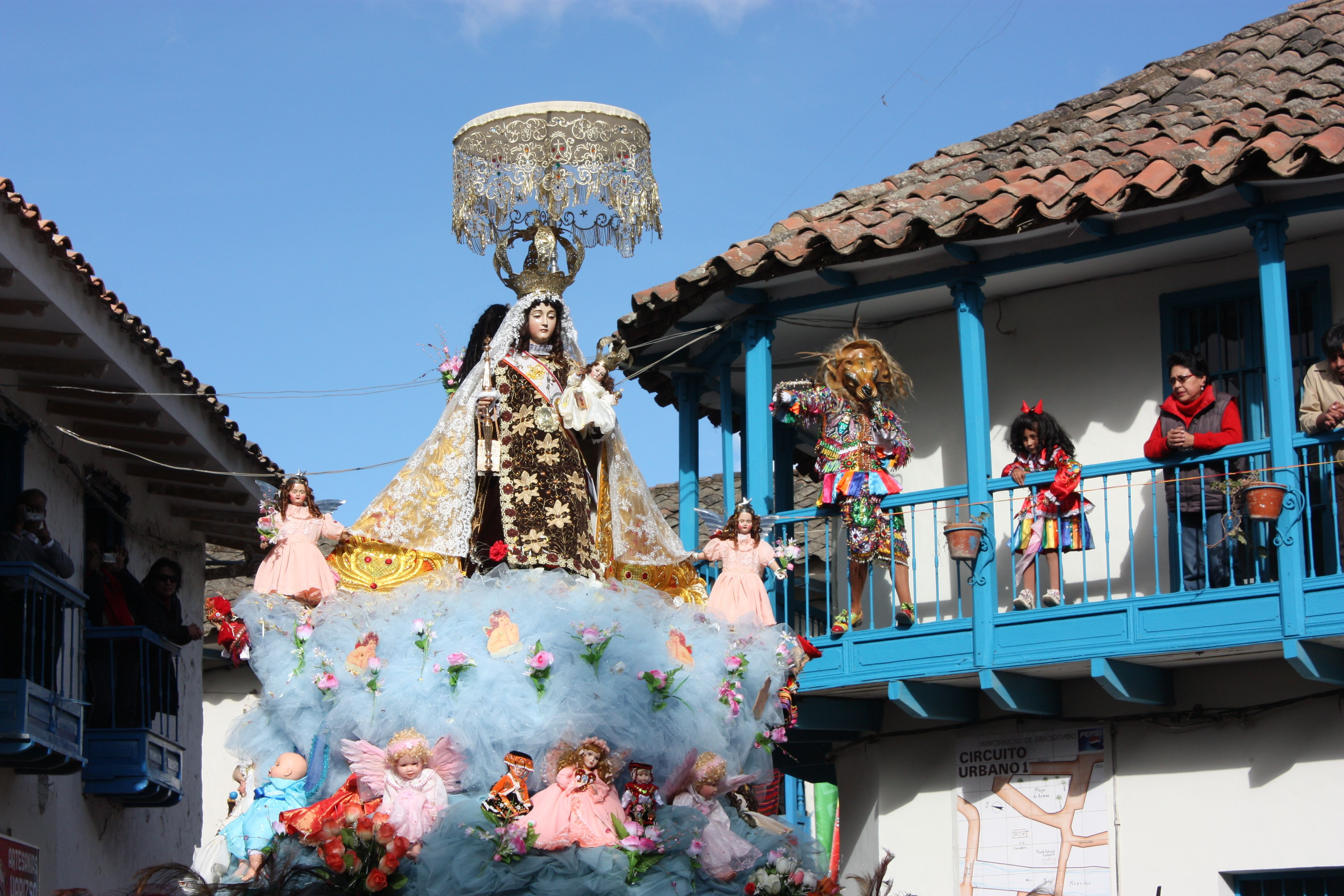
Paucartambo, Peru

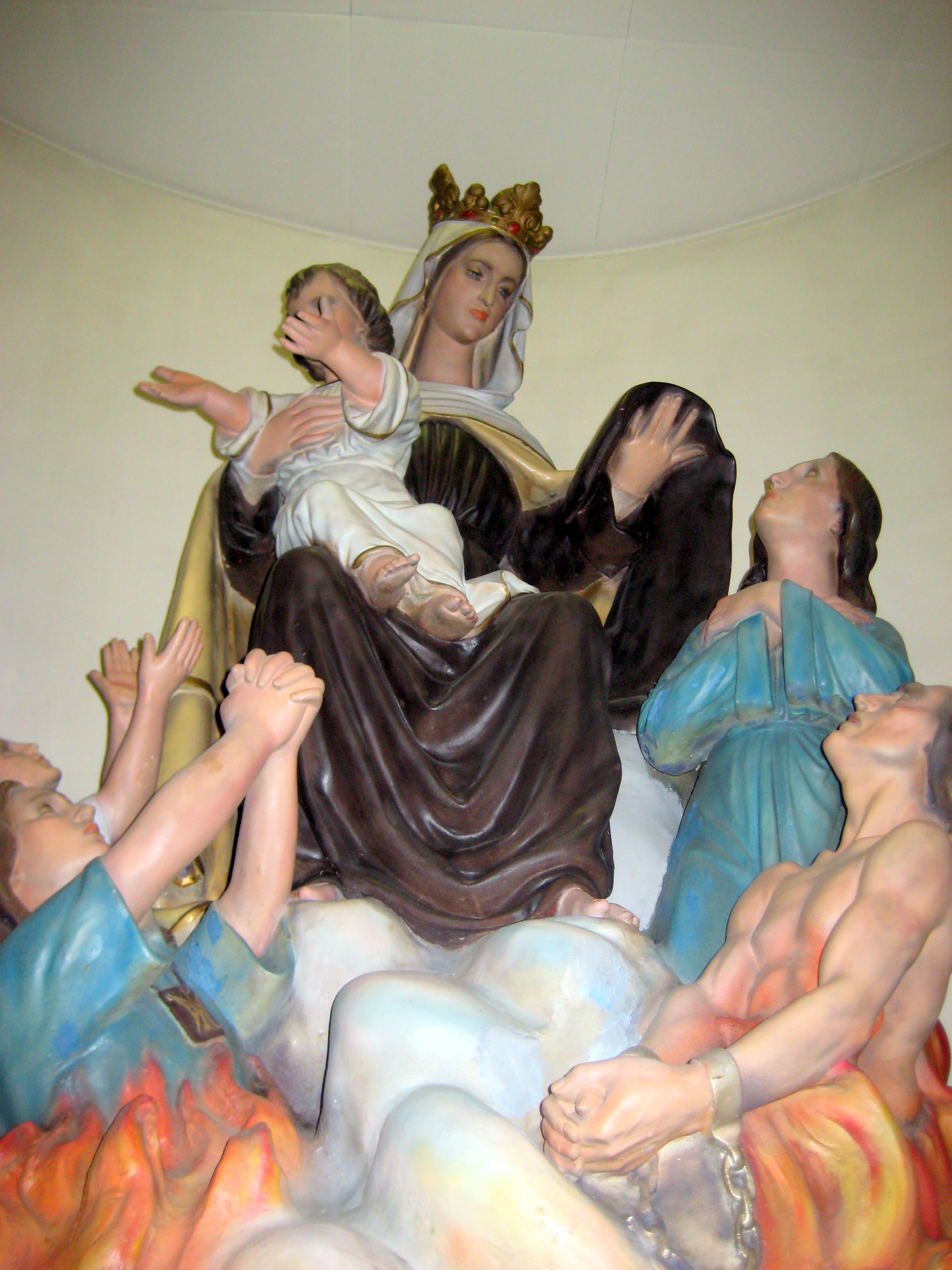
Boston, United States

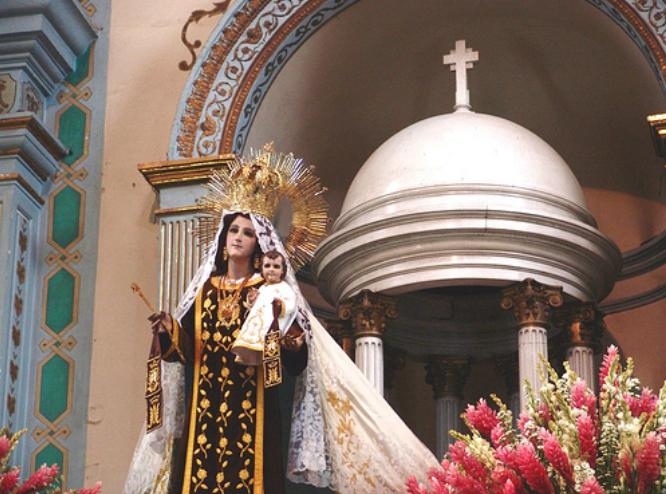
Oaxaca, Mexico

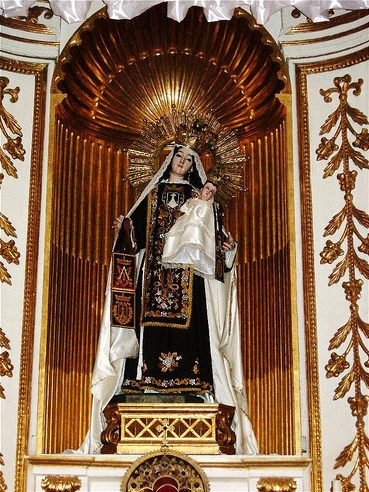
Oaxaca, Mexico

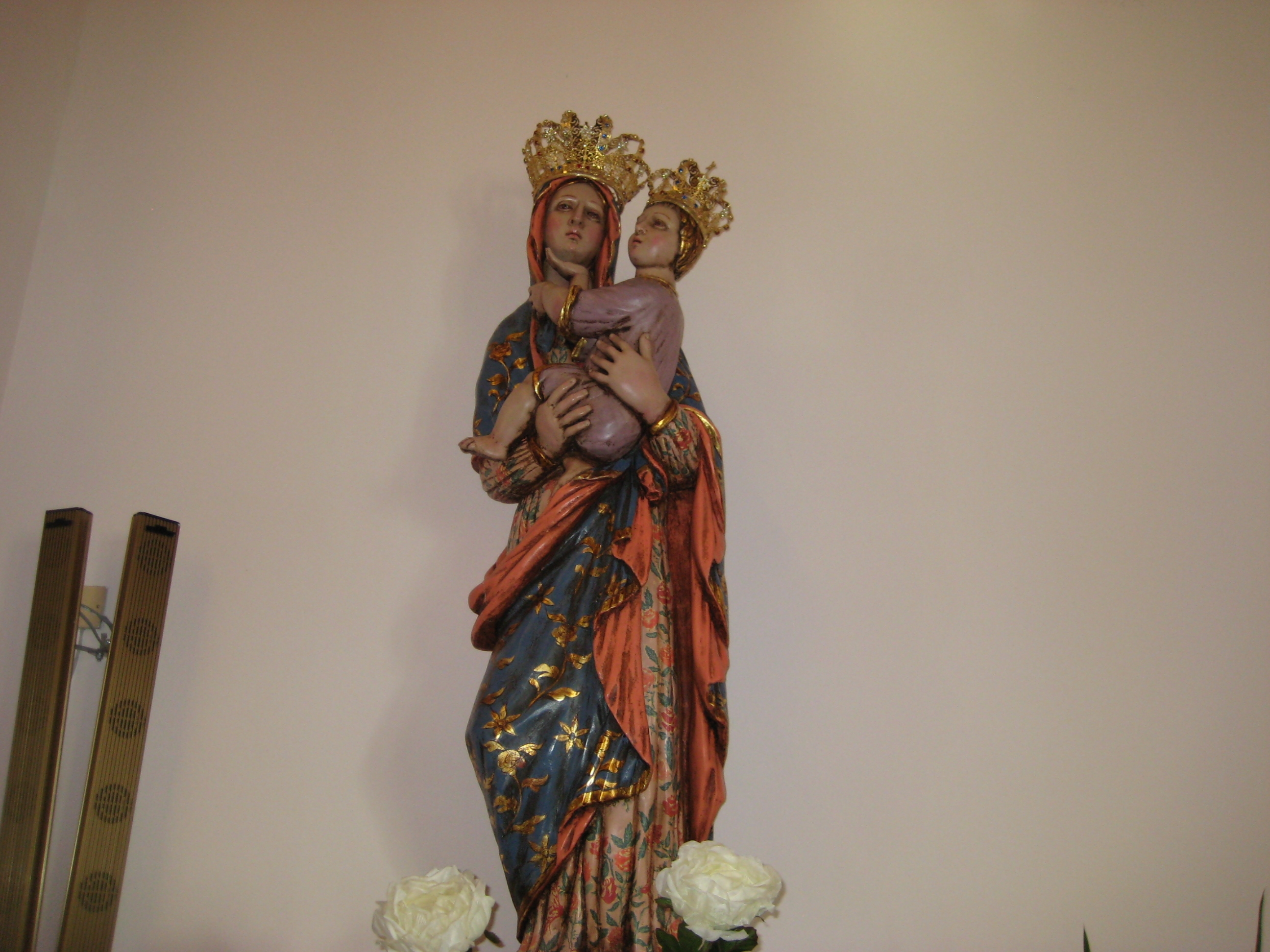
Pattada, Sardinia

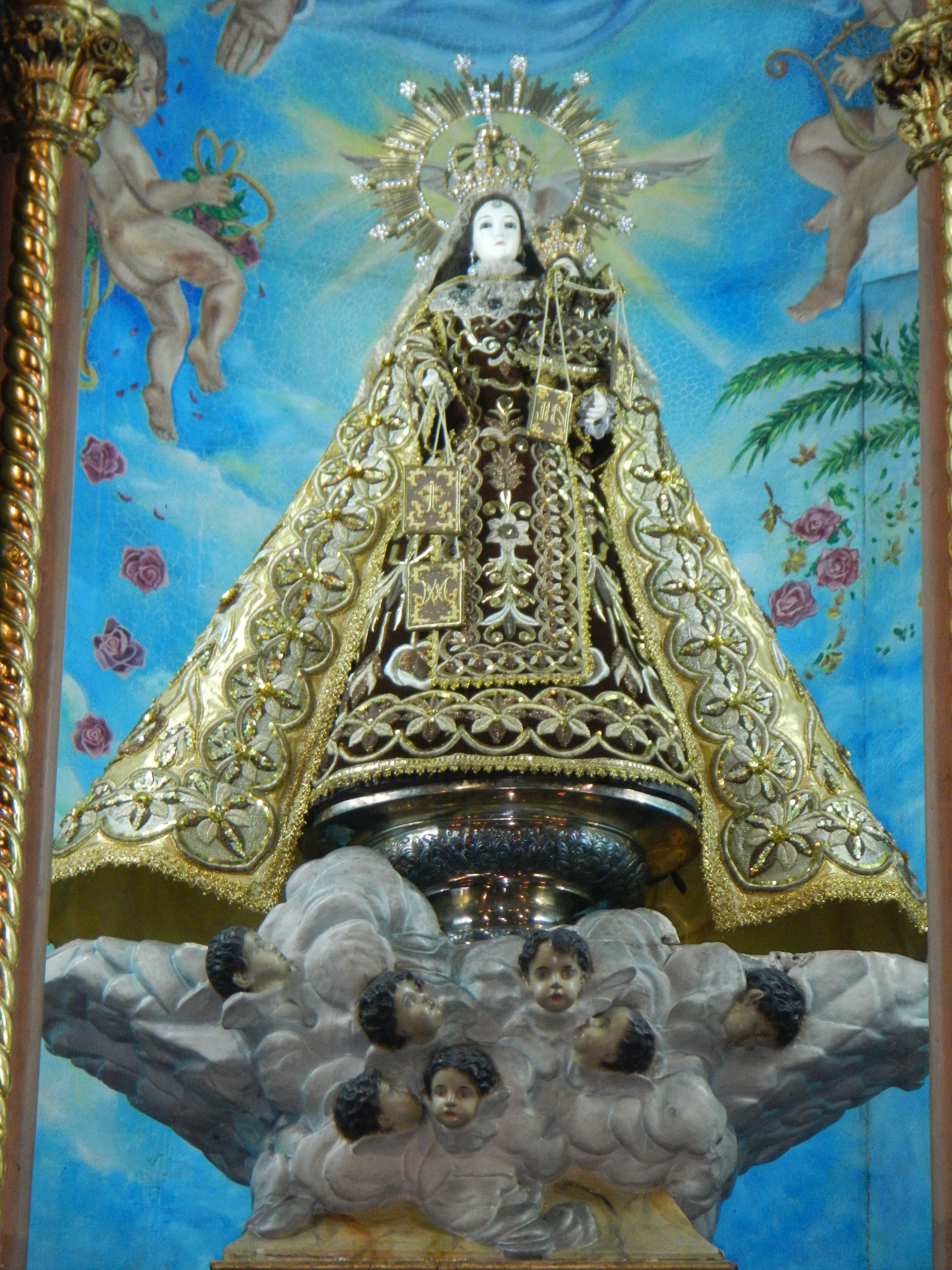
Manila, Philippines

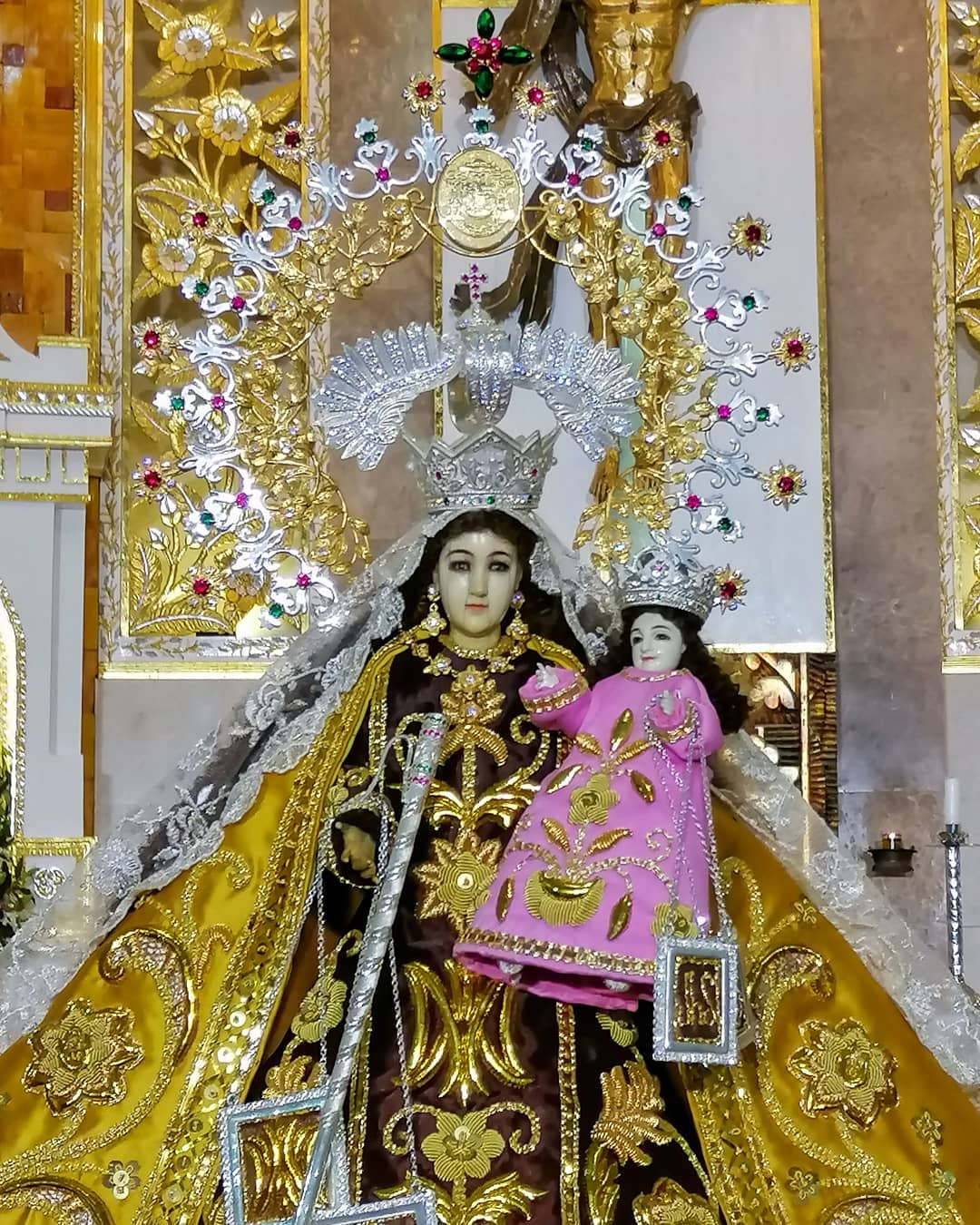
Santa Maria, Bulacan, Philippines

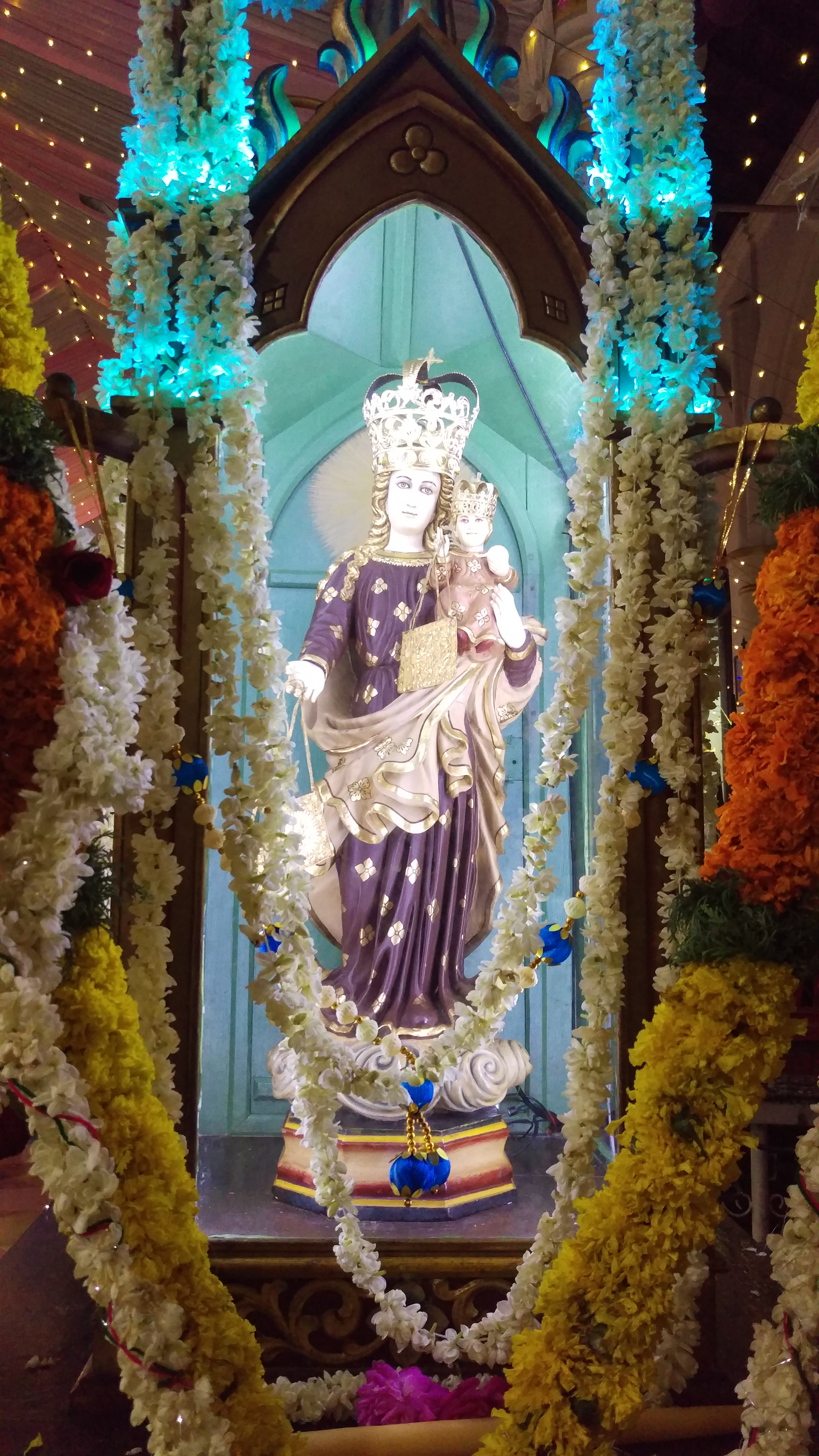
Miraculous image of Our Lady of Mount Carmel, Varapuzha Basilica, India

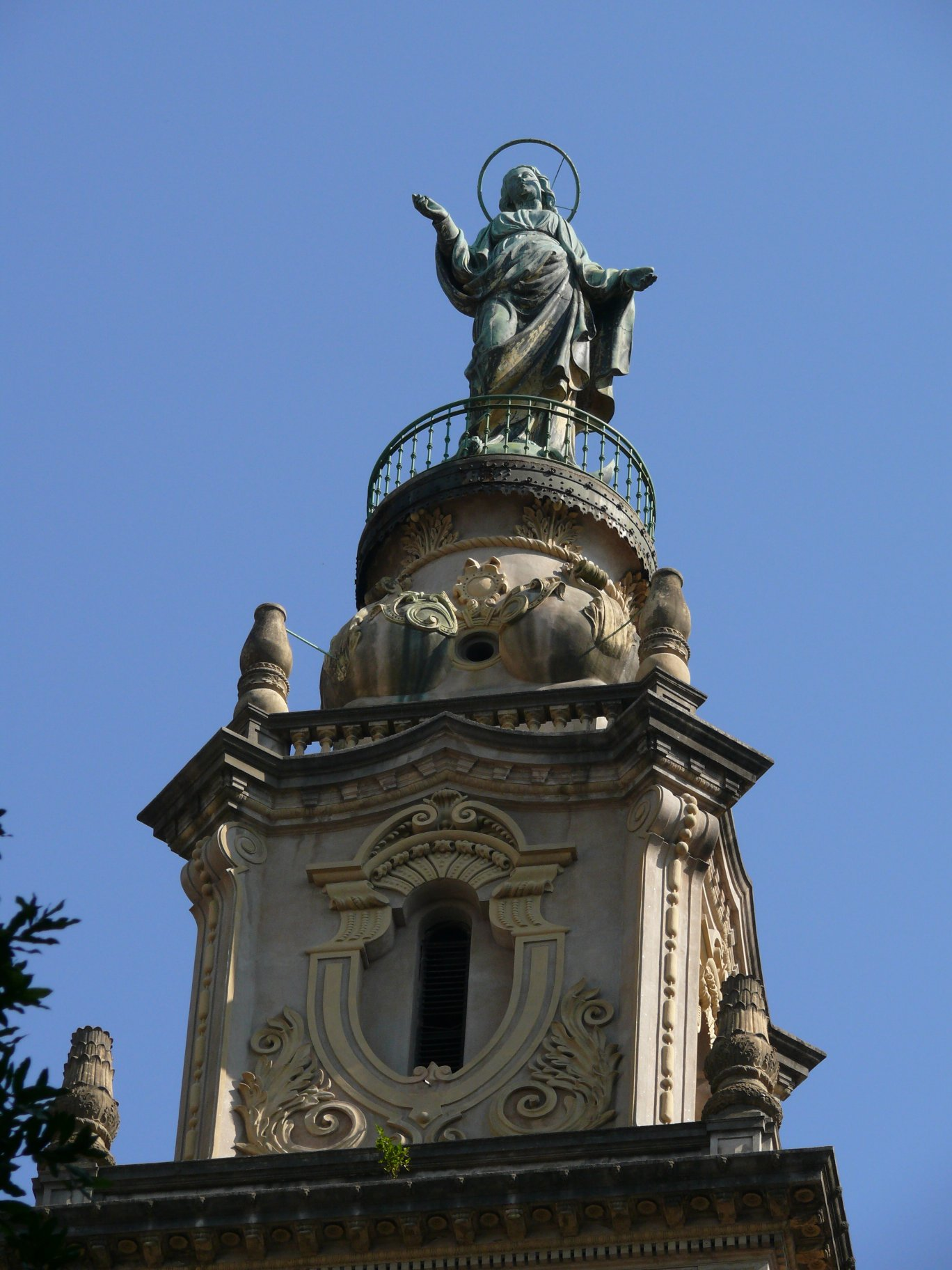
Our Lady of Mount Carmel statue on the top of the Old Cathedral of Rio de Janeiro's bell tower

== Notable churches named after Our Lady of Mount Carmel ==
=== Brazil ===
- Church of Our Lady of Mount Carmel, Ouro Preto, Minas Gerais

=== Italy ===
- Basilica of Our Lady of Mount Carmel, Naples
- Church of Our Lady of Mount Carmel, Bagnara Calabra

=== Philippines ===
- Our Lady of Mount Carmel Parish, Malolos, Bulacan
- Basilica of the National Shrine of Our Lady of Mount Carmel, New Manila, Quezon City

=== United States ===
- National Shrine of Our Lady of Mount Carmel, Middleton, New York
- Our Lady of Mount Carmel Church, New Bedford, Massachusetts
- Our Lady of Mount Carmel Church (Bronx)
- Our Lady of Mount Carmel Church (Manhattan)
- Our Lady of Mount Carmel Church, Patchogue, New York
- Our Lady of Mount Carmel Church, Buckeye Lake, Ohio
- Our Lady of Mount Carmel Church, Newport News, Virginia

== See also ==
- Byzantine Discalced Carmelites
- Discalced Carmelites
- Prayer of the Blessed Virgin
- Our Lady of Mount Carmel, patron saint archive
