= Sabbatine Privilege =

Belief regarding the intercession of the Virgin Mary

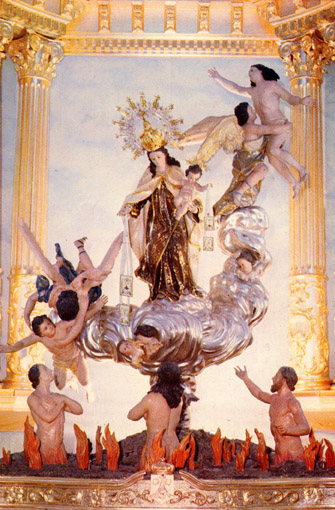
Our Lady of Mount Carmel with angels and souls in Purgatory. Baroque sculpture from Beniaján (Spain)

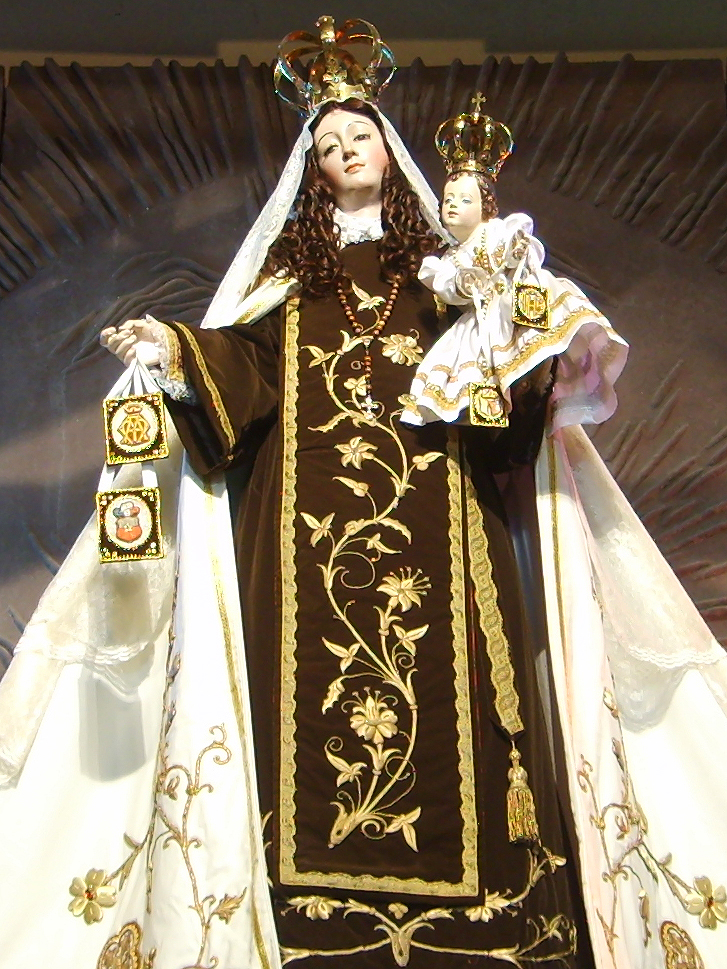
Our Lady of Mount Carmel statue in Chile with a Brown Scapular

In Roman Catholicism, the Sabbatine Privilege refers to a belief in the early liberation of souls from Purgatory, on the first Saturday after death, through the special intercession and petition of the Virgin Mary. The Privilege is based on an apocryphal Papal Bull Sacratissimo uti culmine, dated 3 March 1322 and attributed to Pope John XXII. The Bull is universally regarded by scholars as inauthentic.

In this bull, the Pope was said to have declared that the Mother of God had appeared to him, most urgently recommended to him the Carmelite Order and its members, revealed the Sabbatine privilege, and asked that he reveal and ratify it before the world.

Officially, the Carmelite Orders merely encourage a belief of Mary's aid and prayerful assistance for wearers of the Brown Scapular that live and die in the state of grace, observe chastity according to their state in life, and live a life of prayer and penitence, and commend devotion to Mary especially on Saturdays. They explicitly state in official catechetical materials that they do not promulgate the Sabbatine privilege, and are in line with official Church teachings on the matter.

== History ==
According to the apocryphal bull, the Blessed Virgin is said to have asked that Pope John, should ratify the indulgences which Jesus Christ had already granted in heaven for the members of the Carmelite Order and for the members of the confraternity. She herself would graciously descend on the Saturday (the Sabbath, hence 'Sabbatine') after their death to liberate and conduct to heaven all who were in Purgatory. The bull lists the conditions which the confratres and consorores must fulfill. These conditions include: to observe chastity according to their state of life, recite daily the Little Office of the Blessed Virgin Mary, or abstain from meat on Wednesdays and Saturdays, or accomplish faithfully some other similar sacrifice.

Information of this Bull is derived from a work of the Carmelite Balduinus Leersius ("Collectaneum exemplorum et miraculorum" in Bibliotheca Carmelit, I, Orléans, 1752, p. 210), who died in 1483. The privilege was not without opposition. In 1603 a book containing the privileges of the Carmelite Order, including the Sabbatine privilege, was condemned by the Portuguese Inquisition. Six years later the church in Portugal put all books mentioning the Sabbatine privilege on the Index of Forbidden Books. An appeal to Rome ended when the Roman authorities supported the Inquisition's ban.

The tradition of the Sabbatine Bull seems to have spread in the fifteenth century. Historically, however, the tradition of the Sabbatine Bull is vulnerable. No evidence of the Bull appears in the registers of John XXII. Its literary character is entirely too odd to recommend it as the work of John XXII. The authenticity of the Bull was keenly contested, especially in the seventeenth century, but was vigorously defended by the Carmelites. The chief opponents of its authenticity were Joannnes Launoy and the Bollandist Daniel Papebroch, both of whom published works against it. Today it is universally regarded by scholars as inauthentic, even the "Monumenta histor. Carmelit." of the Carmelite B. Zimmerman (I, Lérins, 1907, pp. 356–63) joining in rejecting it. Carmelite historians have determined that the bull is a fifteenth-century forgery originating in Sicily.

Determination of the forgery casts serious doubt on its tradition that the Sabbatine Privilege originated in a Marian apparition to Pope John XXII. That the Sabbatine Privilege is an interpretation, based on theological grounds, of the Marian promise to St. Simon Stock is the most plausible explanation of the origin of the Sabbatine Bull. Copies of the Bull indicate a close relationship between the promise to St. Simon Stock and the Sabbatine Privilege. "It would seem, then, that the Sabbatine Privilege arose historically in a fuller understanding of the Marian promise to St. Simon Stock."

The Decree of the Holy Office of January 20, 1613, expresses no opinion concerning the validity of the Bull. It permitted the Carmelites to preach that

"the faithful may devoutly believe that the Blessed Virgin by her continuous intercession, merciful prayers, merits and special protection will assist the souls of deceased brothers and members of the confraternity, especially on Saturday, the day which the church dedicates to the Blessed Virgin. The conditions for trusting in such a favor are that the recipients die in a state of grace, wear the Carmelite habit, observe chastity according to their state in life and recite the little office of the Blessed Virgin; if they can not recite it they are to observe the church fasts and abstain from meat on Wednesdays and Saturdays, unless Christmas falls on these days."

This was not a confirmation of the Sabbatine privilege. It simply permitted that the faithful may believe that Our Lady will assist members of the scapular confraternity after the deaths if certain other requirements are kept. The Bull forbids the painting of pictures representing, in accordance with the wording of the Bull, the Mother of God descending into Purgatory.

== Catechesis ==
The Sabbatine privilege thus consists essentially in the early liberation from Purgatory, through the special intercession and petition of the Virgin Mary, which she graciously exercises in favour of her devoted servants preferentially on the day consecrated to her, Saturday. Furthermore, the conditions for the gaining of the privilege are of such a kind as justify a special trust in the assistance of Mary.

In 2001 Patrick McMahon, O.Carm., and Sam Anthony Morello, OCD, completed a booklet containing the updated catechesis on the Brown Scapular of Our Lady of Mount Carmel. Morello and McMahon had been mandated by the five Carmelite provincials in the United States to prepare a booklet that would present the official teaching of the Catholic Church and the Carmelite Orders on this sacramental for which the Carmelite Orders are responsible.

When asked what theological meaning could be drawn from the stories if they are not historically factual, Morello said,

“We know that private revelation can neither add to nor detract from the deposit of faith. The Sabbatine Privilege or the historicity of the vision is not part of the deposit of faith. Private revelation cannot change that.” Morello continued, “What we are talking about here is the grace of final perseverance. We believe that the story expresses our confidence that Mary will seek that grace for all who remain faithful to the Carmelite vocation throughout their lives not only the religious, but the laity who affiliate to the order through the scapular."

McMahon added, “People are free to believe it if they wish, but we cannot say that the Church teaches it."

In the early 21st century, the Carmelite Orders — while encouraging a belief in Mary's general aid and prayerful assistance for their souls beyond death, and commending devotion to Mary, especially on Saturdays which are dedicated to her — state explicitly in their official catechetical materials that they do not promulgate the Sabbatine privilege, and are in agreement with official Church teaching on the matter.
