= Simon Stock =

13th-century English saint; Carmelite Prior

Saint Simon Stock OCarm
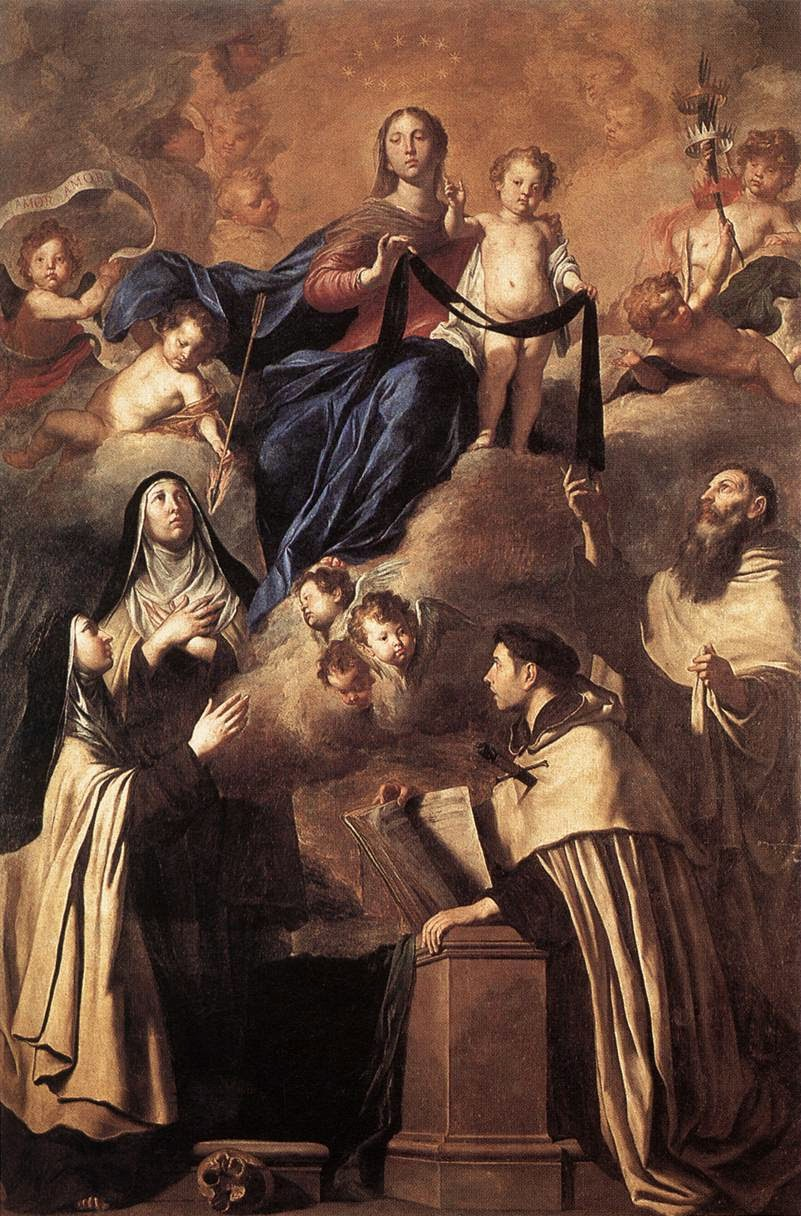
- Pietro Novelli, Our Lady of Mount Carmel and Carmelite saints (Simon Stock (standing), Angelus of Jerusalem (kneeling), Mary Magdalene de'Pazzi, Teresa of Avila), 1641
- Born: c. 1165 possibly Aylesford England
- Died: 16 May 1265; Bordeaux, France
- Venerated in: Roman Catholic Church
- Major shrine: Aylesford, England
- Feast: May 16
- Attributes: holding or receiving the brown scapular
- Patronage: Bordeaux, France

Simon Stock, OCarm was an English Catholic priest and saint who lived in the 13th century and was an early prior of the Carmelite Order. The Blessed Virgin Mary is traditionally said to have appeared to him and given him the Brown Scapular. Popular devotion to Saint Simon Stock is usually associated with devotion to Our Lady of Mount Carmel.

== Life ==
The Brothers of the Blessed Virgin Mary of Mount Carmel had their origins as a hermit community in Palestine; with the fall of the Crusader Kingdoms and the resumption of Muslim rule, in the early 13th century the members moved to Europe where they became mendicant friars. Simon was born in England and was perhaps elected to be Prior General at a London chapter meeting in 1254.

Historical evidence about Simon's life is very scarce; he is mentioned in two necrologies from the 14th century. They attest to his reputation for holiness and a trip made to Jerusalem. There is no evidence for him having lived for a time in a hollow tree. He is believed to have lived at Aylesford in Kent, a place that hosted in 1247 the first general chapter of the Carmelite Order held outside the Holy Land, and where there is still a priory of Carmelite friars which displays his cranium as a relic.

The earliest extant liturgical office in Simon Stock's honour was composed in Bordeaux in France, and dates from 1435. Liturgies are first known to have been celebrated in Ireland and England in 1458, and throughout the Carmelite Order in 1564. His feast day, an optional memorial, is May 16. Simon Stock is the patron saint of the English province of Discalced Carmelites.

== Brown Scapular ==
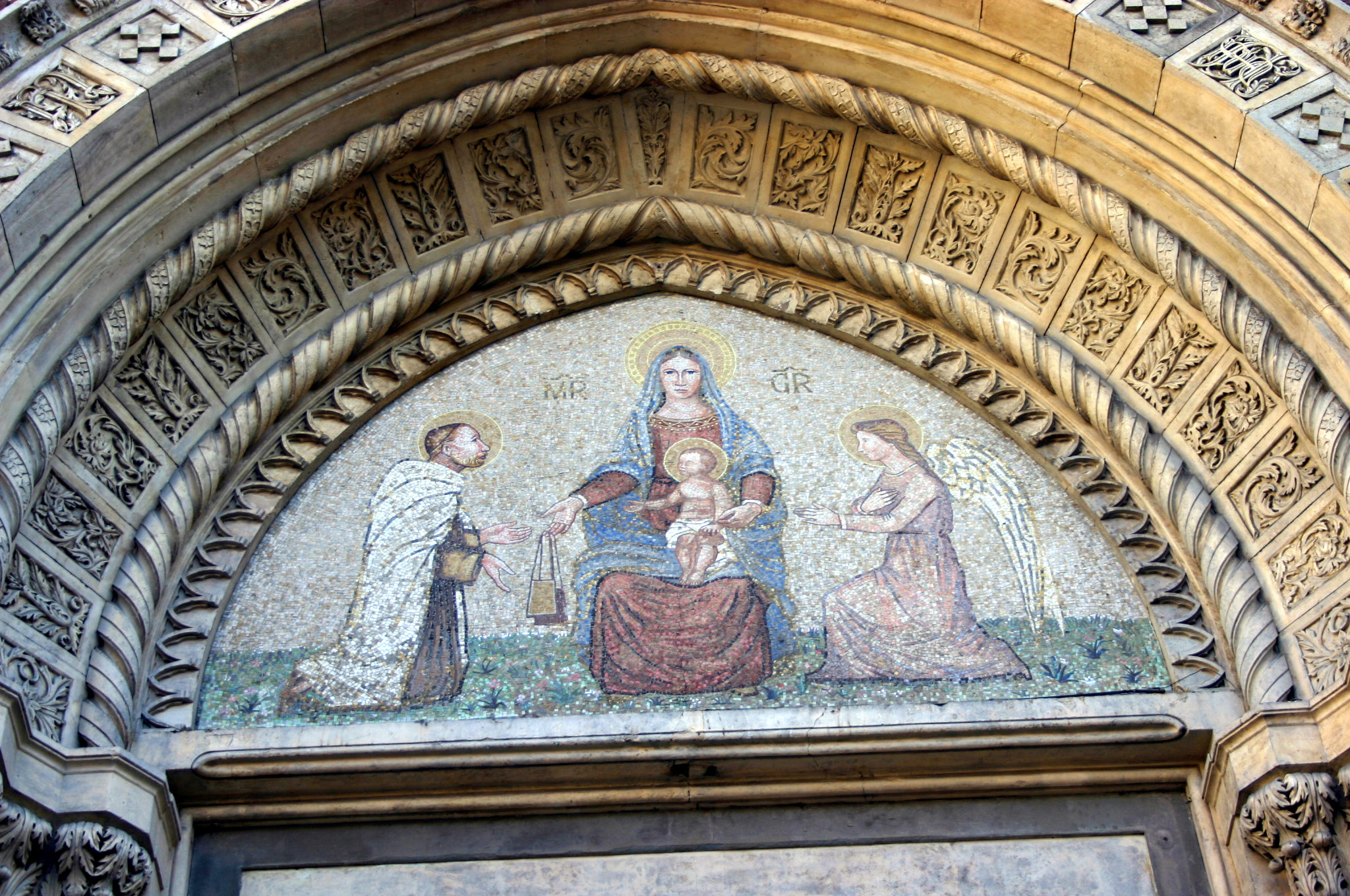
Chiesa del Carmine, Milan. Simon Stock and an angel.

The earliest surviving accounts of Simon's life do not mention him having a vision. The first known reference dates from the late 14th century, over 100 years after 16 July, 1251, the date when tradition says the vision occurred. The Virgin was said to have appeared to him holding the Scapular in her hand, saying: "whoever dies clothed in this habit shall not suffer the fires of hell." Beginning in the 16th century, the Carmelites began giving the Brown Scapular to lay people who wanted to be more closely affiliated with them. It soon became popular as a religious article.

Scholarly investigation into historical sources has raised questions about whether Simon Stock's vision actually happened. Several religious orders in the Middle Ages told stories of Mary giving them their habit or promising protection. The great Carmelite authors of the 14th century do not mention the scapular at all. Challenges to the historicity of the scapular vision (and passionate defenses of it) are not a new phenomenon; a notable challenge came in 1653, from a scholar at the University of Paris, Jean de Launoy. In response, a Carmelite named John Cheron published a fragment of a letter which he purported to be an account by Simon Stock's secretary Peter Swanington (or Swanyngton), giving details of Simon's life, and the scapular vision. It is a fabrication.

Devotion to the Brown Scapular remains widespread and is recommended by the Catholic Church. The Carmelites continue to find meaning in the traditional story and use it as a spiritual means of deepening their filial relationship with Mary. When Pope John Paul II addressed the Carmelite family in 2001 on the occasion of the 750th anniversary of the bestowal of the scapular, he said that this devotion was "a treasure for the whole Church," noting that the devotion was "so deeply and widely accepted by the People of God that it came to be expressed in the memorial of 16 July," the Feast of Our Lady of Mount Carmel. The pope himself was known to wear the scapular.

== See also ==
- Scapular of Our Lady of Mount Carmel

== Notes ==
Preceded by Alain	Prior General of the Order of Carmelites; 1254–1265	Succeeded by Nicolas Le Françoi
