= Scapular of Our Lady of Mount Carmel =

Catholic devotional garment

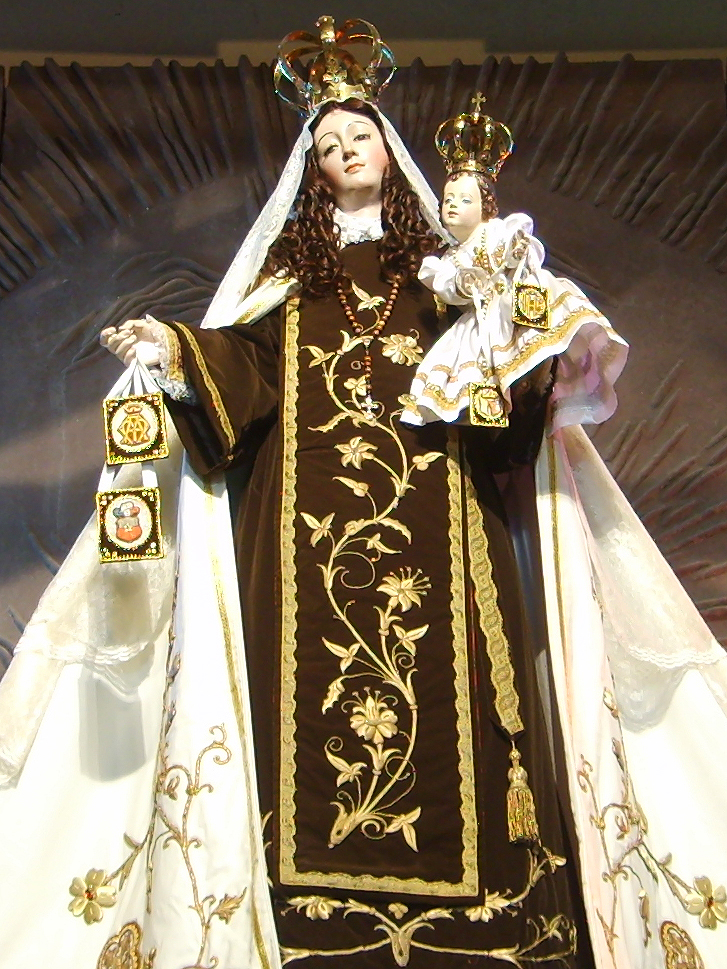
Our Lady of Mount Carmel statue in Chile with a Brown Scapular

The Scapular of Our Lady of Mount Carmel (also known as the Brown Scapular) belongs to the habit of both the Carmelite Order and the Discalced Carmelite Order, both of which have Our Lady of Mount Carmel as their patroness. In its small form, it is widely popular among Catholics. It serves as the prototype of all devotional scapulars. The liturgical feast day of Our Lady of Mount Carmel, July 16, is popularly associated with the devotion of the Scapular.

According to the Vatican's Dicastery for Divine Worship, the Brown Scapular is "an external sign of the filial relationship established between the Blessed Virgin Mary, Mother and Queen of Mount Carmel, and the faithful who entrust themselves totally to her protection, who have recourse to her maternal intercession, who are mindful of the primacy of the spiritual life and the need for prayer."

== History ==
In its origin as a practical garment, a scapular was a type of work apron, frequently used by monks, consisting of large pieces of cloth front and back joined over the shoulders with strips of cloth. It forms part of the habit of some religious orders including the Carmelites. The first Carmelite hermits who lived on Mount Carmel in the Holy Land in the 12th century are thought to have worn a belted tunic and striped mantle typical of pilgrims; when the Carmelites moved to Europe in the 13th century and became a mendicant order of friars they adopted a new habit that included a brown belted tunic, brown scapular, hood, and white mantle.

In the Middle Ages, a habit was an essential part of the identity of members of religious orders. To remove one's habit was tantamount to leaving the monastic state. The Carmelite Constitution of 1369 stipulates automatic excommunication for Carmelites who say Mass without a scapular, while the Constitutions of 1324 and 1294 consider it a serious fault to sleep without the scapular.

It was customary for laypeople who belonged to confraternities, sodalities, or third orders affiliated with the religious orders to wear some sign of membership, frequently some part derived from the religious habit such as a cord, cloak or scapular. During part of their history, the lay affiliates of the Carmelites wore the white mantle which the friars wore, or even the full habit. The small brown scapular and Mary's promise of salvation for the wearer, began to be promoted to the laity in the form we are familiar with today by Giovanni Battista Rossi, prior general of the Carmelites from 1564 to 1578.

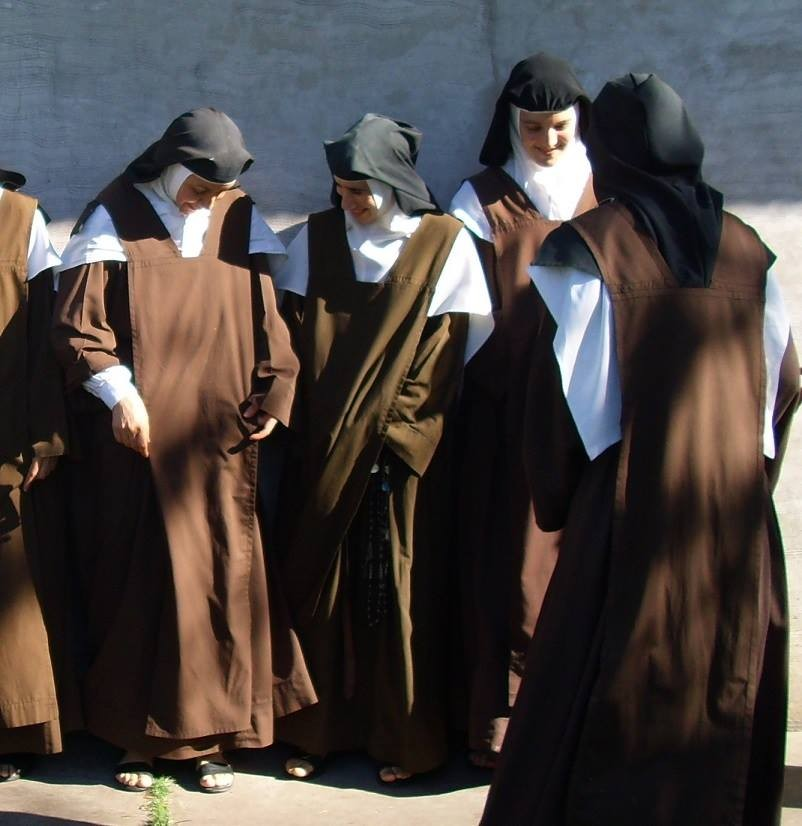
Discalced Carmelite nuns from Argentina wearing the Brown Scapular

The Carmelite scapular was widespread in European countries at the end of the 16th century. There are many books that include formulas of blessing for those who wear the scapular. The moment when they receive the scapular formally is significant, as is the hour of death.

=== Historical difficulties ===
According to traditional accounts, the Blessed Virgin Mary appeared at Cambridge to St. Simon Stock, a man not otherwise documented in historical record, but often described as a Prior General of the Carmelite Order in the middle of the 13th century. The legend states that the Virgin appeared to Stock, holding the Scapular, and promised that all who wear it will be spared suffering in Purgatory.

The first mention of the vision appeared almost 150 years after the date in 1251 when it is said to have occurred and is not noted in the earliest accounts of Simon Stock's life and miracles. The history of the Carmelite habit and legislation concerning it do not mention a tradition about the Blessed Virgin giving the Scapular to the Carmelites. Notable Carmelite writers of the 14th century do not mention the scapular. History even records an instance in 1375 when an English Carmelite named Nicholas Hornby engaged in a public debate with a Dominican friar in which Hornby ridiculed Dominican claims to have received their habit from the Blessed Virgin—this was a claim common to several different orders in the Middle Ages. Hornby showed no sign of being aware of any similar claim that had been made by a fellow English Carmelite in the preceding century.

== Appearance ==
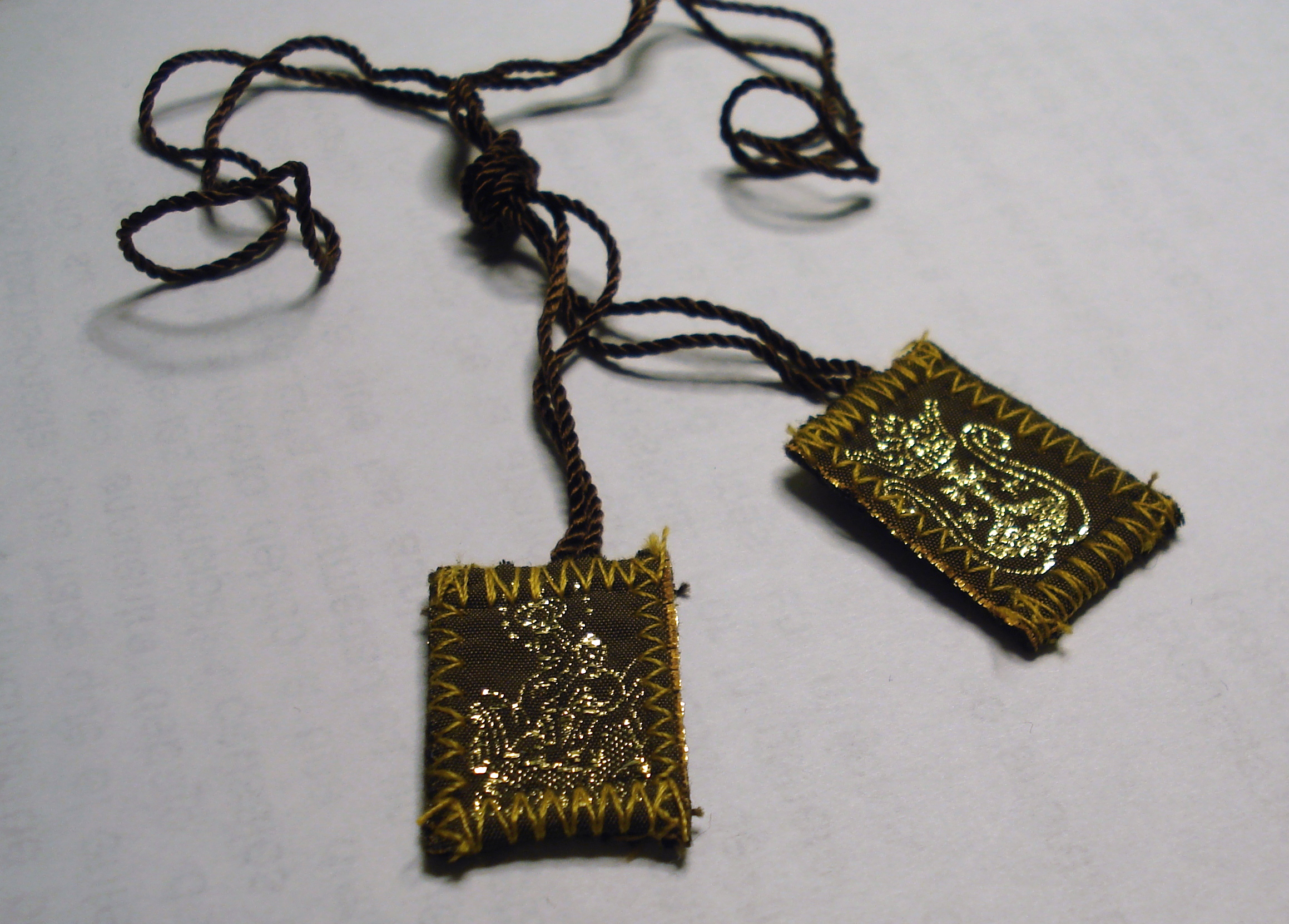
The Scapular of Our Lady of Mount Carmel, also called the "Brown Scapular", with gold embroidery.

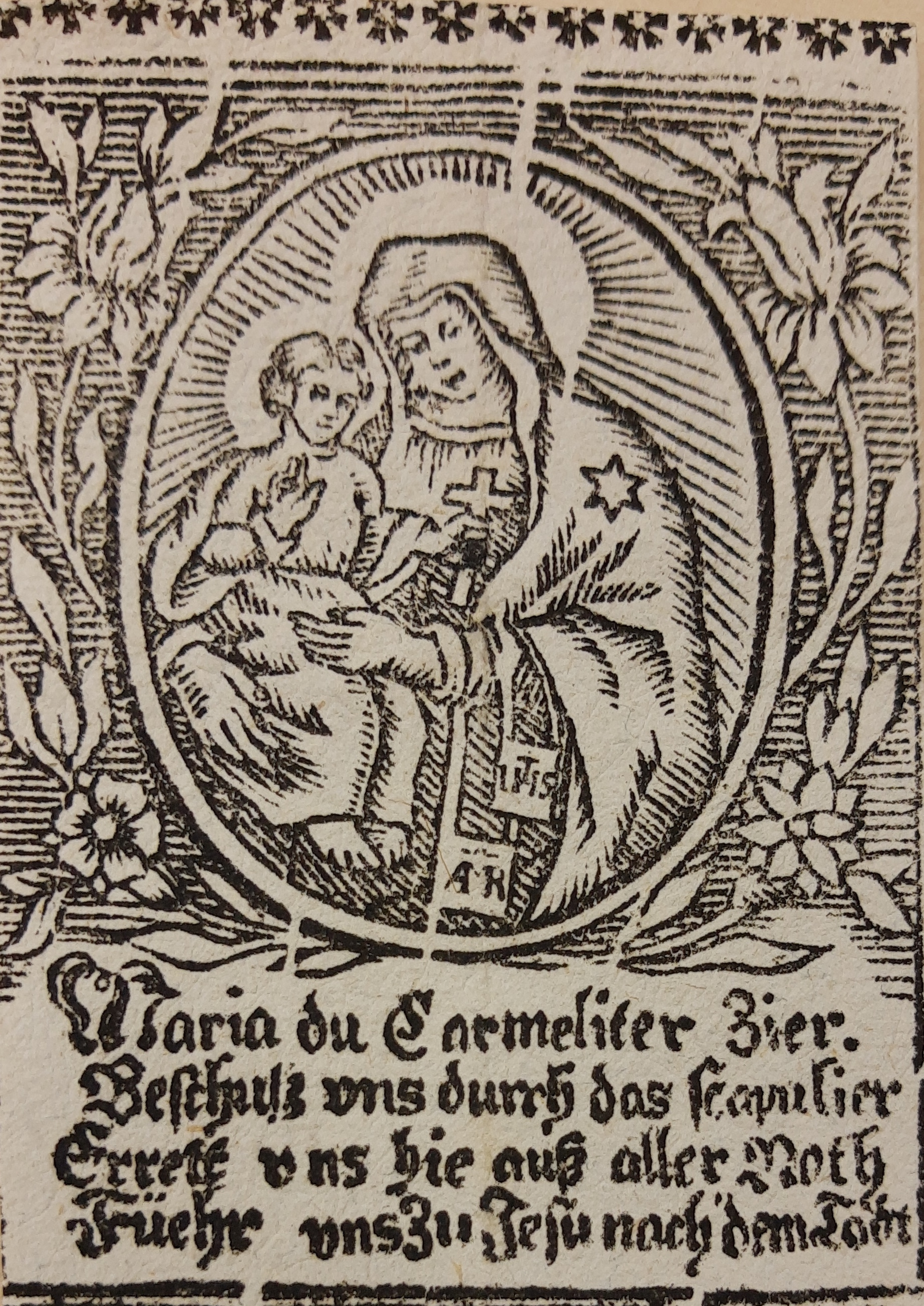
Devotional print for a Scapular Confraternity in Salzburg, 18th century.

In current documents prepared by Carmelite superiors and given imprimatur by the Archbishop of Washington D.C., the scapular must consist of two pieces of brown cloth with one segment hanging on the wearer's chest, and the other hanging on his/her back. These pieces are joined by two straps or strings which overlap each shoulder—hence the word "scapular" (shoulder blade). Religious pictures or symbols, though unnecessary, may be sewn on; this custom began in the eighteenth century. The catechesis also acknowledged that the Scapular was formerly required to be made from 100% wool (a rule since dropped); it further stated the habits of the Carmelite religious are also now typically made of other, less expensive yet more practical materials.

Because wool deteriorates rapidly in tropical climates, since 1910 those properly invested into a confraternity may wear properly blessed scapular medals with the depiction of Jesus with his Sacred Heart on one panel and Mary on the obverse. It is acceptable to wear a metal scapular medal, though one must be invested with the cloth scapular first.

== Enrollment ==
Unlike typical sacramentals, scapulars are not merely blessed, but given to the wearer in a ritual led by a priest. Any Catholic priest may invest a baptised Catholic with the Brown Scapular. The most recent Rite for the Blessing of and Enrollment in the Scapular, approved in 1996 by the Congregation for Divine Worship and the Discipline of the Sacraments, is available in booklet form.

The short form of the investiture is as follows:

Receive this Scapular, a sign of your special relationship with Mary, the Mother of Jesus, whom you pledge to imitate. May it be a reminder to you of your dignity as a Christian, in serving others and imitating Mary. Wear it as a sign of her protection and of belonging to the Family of Carmel, voluntarily doing the will of God and devoting yourself to building a world true to his plan of community, justice and peace.

According to a 1996 doctrinal statement approved by the Congregation for Divine Worship and the Discipline of the Sacraments, "Devotion to Our Lady of Mount Carmel is bound to the history and spiritual values of the Order of the Brothers of the Blessed Virgin Mary of Mount Carmel and is expressed through the scapular. Thus, whoever receives the scapular becomes a member of the order and pledges him/herself to live according to its spirituality in accordance with the characteristics of his/her state in life."

== Third Order and Confraternity ==
Like the other mendicant orders such as the Franciscans, the Carmelites formed a Third Order for lay people (the First Order being the friars, the Second Order the nuns), either married or single, who wished to participate deeply in the spirituality and charism of the order, but remain in their secular state of life. Those belonging to the Ancient Observance (O.Carm) branch of the Carmelites are today known as Lay Carmelites, those belonging to the Discalced (OCD) branch of the Carmelites are known as Secular Carmelites, members of both branches belong to communities which meet together regularly for prayer and spiritual formation. The small Brown Scapular is the habit of these Carmelite laity, with a larger ceremonial Scapular normally worn outside the clothes at community meetings and official functions.

There is also a Confraternity of the Brown Scapular. According to the 1996 version of the rite of enrollment, "The scapular confraternity of Carmel is an association of the faithful who strive for the perfection of charity in the world in the spirit of the Carmelite Order, participate in the life of the Order and its spiritual benefits in an intimate communion of thought, ideals, and works together with Mary." Furthermore, the current rules (approved 1996) for starting a canonical local confraternity is given:

The supreme moderator of the Carmelite Order is the competent authority for the canonically established of a confraternity. For churches belonging to the Order, the consent given by he ordinary for the canonical establishment of the religious house is also valid for the canonical establishment of the confraternity. However, for the canonical establishment of the confraternity in other churches or places, the written consent of the ordinary is required. … Members are bound to set aside regularly time to be with God in prayer, frequent participation in the Eucharist, daily recitation of one of the hours of the liturgy or of some psalms or the rosary or other equivalent prayers. If possible, they will meet periodically to build up the sense of fraternity, to study the spirit of Carmel, to care for brothers and sisters in need, all in union with Mary. They may gain plenary indulgences, provided they fulfill the usual conditions, on the day they join the confraternity and on the following feasts: the Blessed Virgin Mary of Mount Carmel (July 16), St Elijah, prophet (July 20), St Simon Stock (May 16), St Therese of the Child Jesus (October 1), St Teresa of Jesus (October 15), All Carmelite Saints (November 14), and St John of the Cross (December 14) …

In Europe in the past there was often a local confraternity which met for fellowship and spiritual formation. Today, at least in North America, those enrolled by a priest into the Confraternity of the Brown Scapular typically have no visible group to belong to, nor are written records kept concerning membership. Some have called for a return to the practice of organized confraternities and renewed awareness of the scapular's connection to Carmelite spirituality.

The current rite of enrollment in the Brown Scapular also permits for persons to be enrolled in the scapular without joining a group.

== Official teaching ==
Carmelite scholar Kieran Kavanaugh summarized the Catholic Church's official position on the Brown Scapular:

With regard to the scapular as a conventional and sacred sign, the Church has intervened at various times in history to clarify its meaning, defend it, and confirm the privileges. From these Church documents there emerges with sufficient clarity the nature and meaning of the Carmelite scapular.

1. The scapular is a Marian habit or garment. It is both a sign and pledge. A sign of belonging to Mary; a pledge of her motherly protection, not only in this life but after death.
2. As a sign, it is a conventional sign signifying three elements strictly joined: first, belonging to a religious family particularly devoted to Mary, especially dear to Mary, the Carmelite Order; second, consecration to Mary, devotion to and trust in her Immaculate Heart; third an incitement to become like Mary by imitating her virtues, above all her humility, chastity, and spirit of prayer.

This is the Church's officially established connection between the sign and that which is signified by the sign.

No mention is made of the vision of St. Simon Stock or of that of Pope John XXII in relation to the Sabbatine Privilege, which promises that one will be released from Purgatory on the first Saturday after death.

== Associated beliefs ==
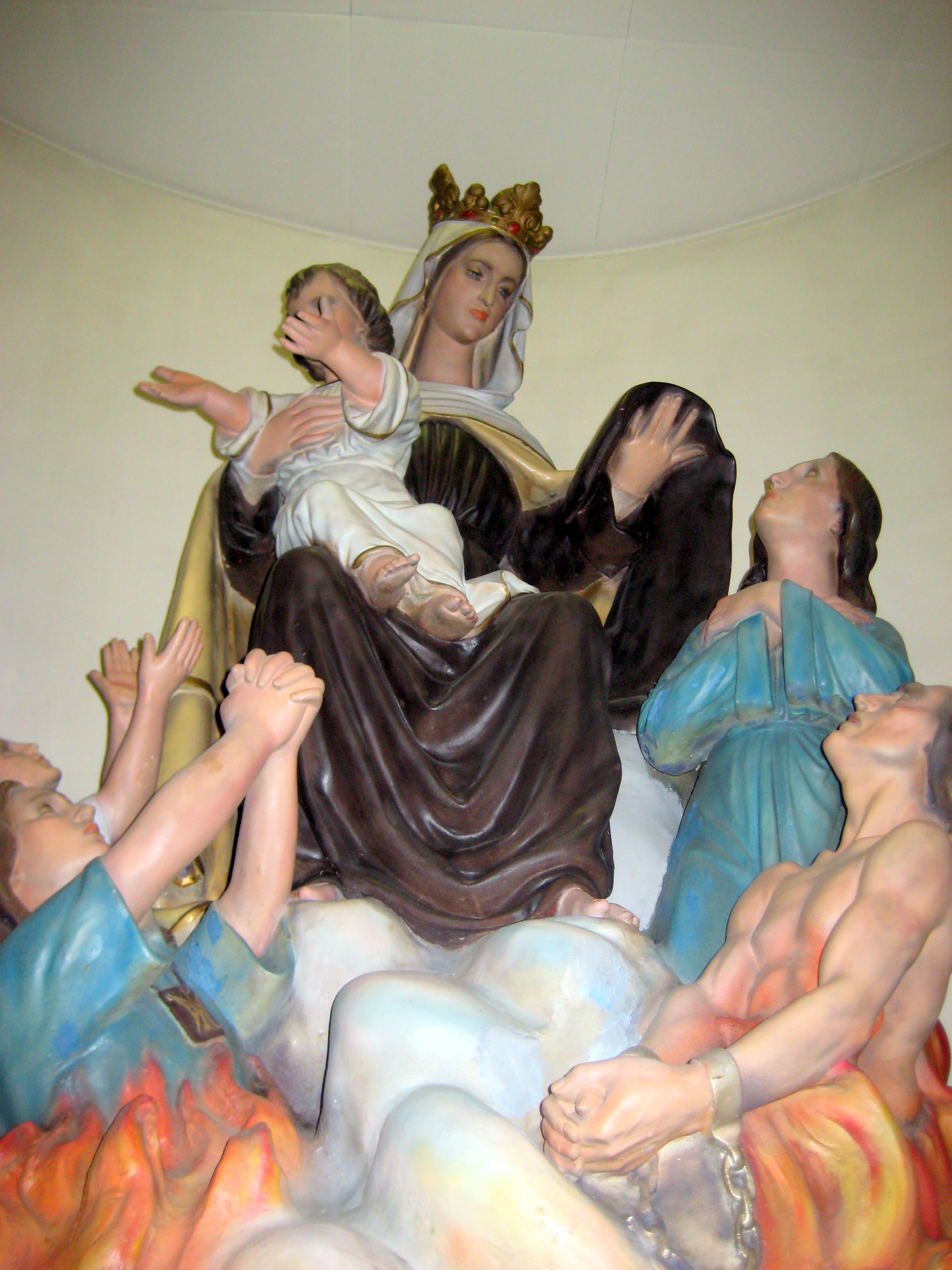
In this statue of Our Lady of Mount Carmel with the Infant Jesus at Saint Leonard of Port Maurice Church, one of the souls in purgatory begging for Mary's intercession appears to be wearing a Scapular of Our Lady of Mount Carmel.

The earliest form of the Scapular promise states simply that wearers of the brown scapular, the Carmelite habit, will be saved. Originally, this referred to Carmelite religious who remained faithful to their vocation. Later the small Brown Scapular became popular with the laity as a sacramental.

The nature of the spiritual help associated with the Brown Scapular came to be described in greater detail and specificity. A traditional formulation of the Scapular Promise is "Take this Scapular. Whosoever dies wearing it shall not suffer eternal fire. It shall be a sign of salvation, a protection in danger and pledge of peace."

Those wearing the Brown Scapular consider themselves consecrated to Mary. In 1951, Pope Pius XII wrote in an Apostolic letter to the Carmelites on the 700th anniversary of the vision of Simon Stock, that he hoped the Scapular would "be to them a sign of their consecration to the most sacred heart of the Immaculate Virgin."

=== Promises of the scapular ===
One of the beliefs most influential in popularizing the brown scapular devotion was a purported promise known as the Sabbatine (Saturday) privilege. This name deduces from the apocryphical papal bull Sacratissimo uti culmine, attributed to Pope John XXII in 1322. It states that Pope John XXII had a vision of Mary personally delivering the souls of Carmelites and Confraternity members out of Purgatory on the first Saturday after their death, as long as they fulfill certain conditions. The Vatican has denied the validity of this document since 1613, but has not forbidden the Carmelites "to preach that the Christian people may piously believe in the help which the souls of brothers and members, who have departed this life in charity, have worn in life the scapular, have ever observed chastity, have recited the Little Hours of the Blessed Virgin Mary, or, if they cannot read, have observed the fast days of the Church, and have abstained from flesh meat on Wednesdays and Saturdays [...], may derive after death — especially on Saturdays, the day consecrated by the Church to the Blessed Virgin [...]." These elements are reflected in older versions of the requirements of enrollment in the Confraternity of the Brown Scapular.

At times the scapular has been criticized as an easy way to heaven, a manner of superstition. The Catechism of the Catholic Church, however, states that sacramentals such as the Brown Scapular "do not confer the grace of the Holy Spirit in the way that the sacraments do, but by the Church's prayer, they prepare us to receive grace and dispose us to cooperate with it."

Today, the Carmelite Orders, while encouraging Marian devotions, explicitly state in their official literature that they do not promulgate the Sabbatine privilege, and that they are at one with official church teaching on the matter.
