= Recanati Annunciation =

Painting by Lorenzo Lotto

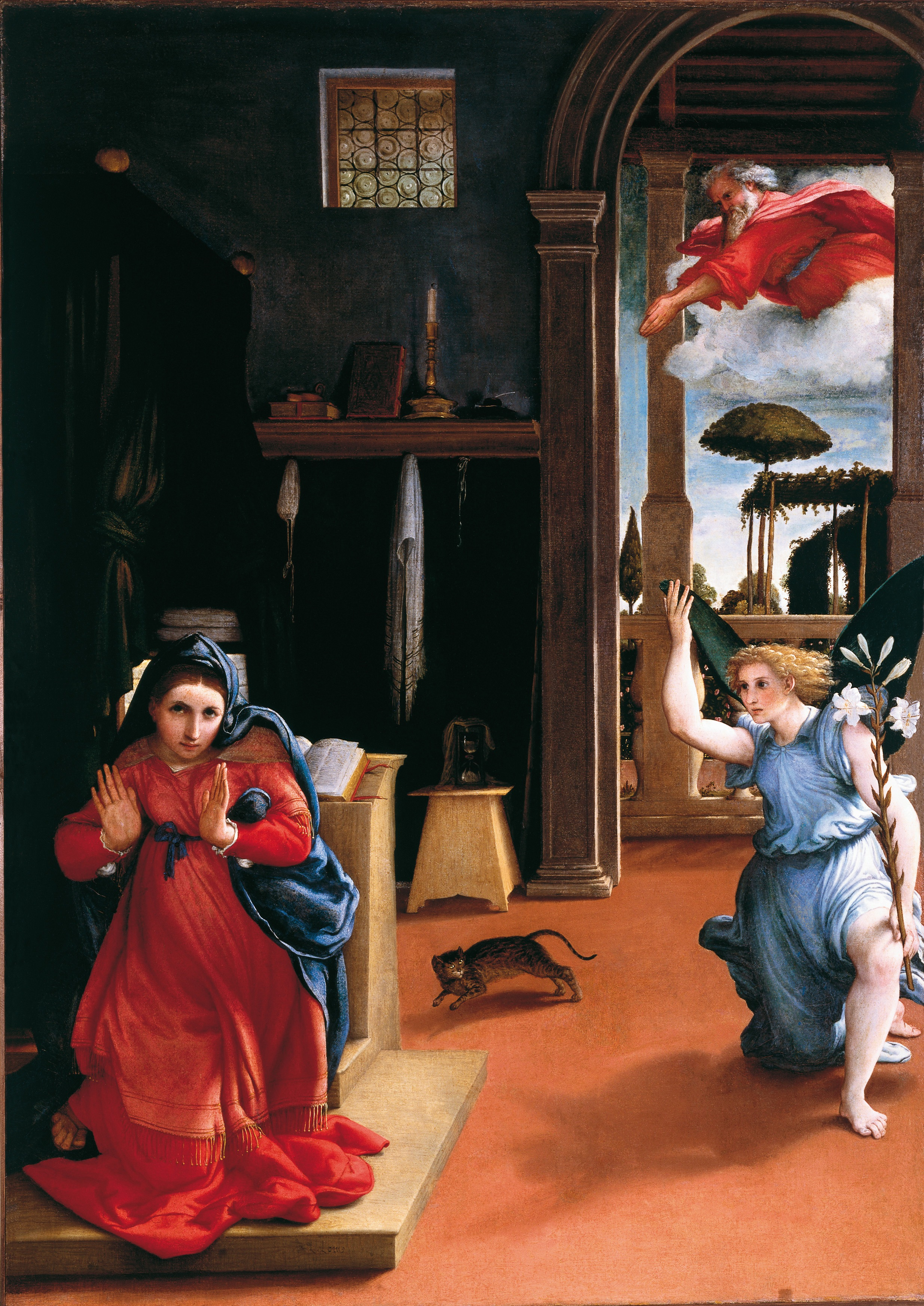
- Artist: Lorenzo Lotto
- Year: c. 1534
- Medium: Oil on canvas
- Dimensions: 166 cm × 114 cm (65 in × 45 in)
- Location: Museo Civico Villa Colloredo Mels; Recanati

The Recanati Annunciation (Italian: Annunciazione di Recanati) is an oil-on-canvas painting by the Italian Renaissance painter Lorenzo Lotto, executed around 1534 and housed in the Civic Museum of Villa Colloredo Mels, Recanati, Italy.

== History ==
The work may date to the artist's sojourn in Venice, from where it would be shipped to the Marche around 1527. Otherwise, it may date to a later period when Looto moved there to execute other works. Today it is generally assigned to a date after the Crucifixion of Monte San Giusto (1533–1534).

The commissioners were perhaps the Brotherhood of the Recanati Traders, who moved to a new seat in 1533 and would therefore use the work for the latter's decoration.

The canvas is mentioned for the first time in 1601.

== Description ==
The painting depicts a bedroom where an Annunciation takes place following an unusual scheme: the angel is on the right, holding a white lily, and has got in from a loggia which opens to a garden (the hortus conclusus). His right arm is pointing at the Father God who has shown in a cloud and is blessing Mary from inside the loggia. Mary is portrayed in the left foreground, looking at the spectator and raising her hands in a surprised gesture.

Stylistically, Lotto used expressive gestures and somewhat under-size heads. The number of carefully painted details show the influence of Northern European paintings: they include the baldachin bed, the small window with sealed glasses, the shelf with a small still life, the hatstand, the stool with an hourglass, the prie-dieu and a scared cat which is fleeing. The baldachin was inspired by a relief by Andrea Sansovino at Loreto.

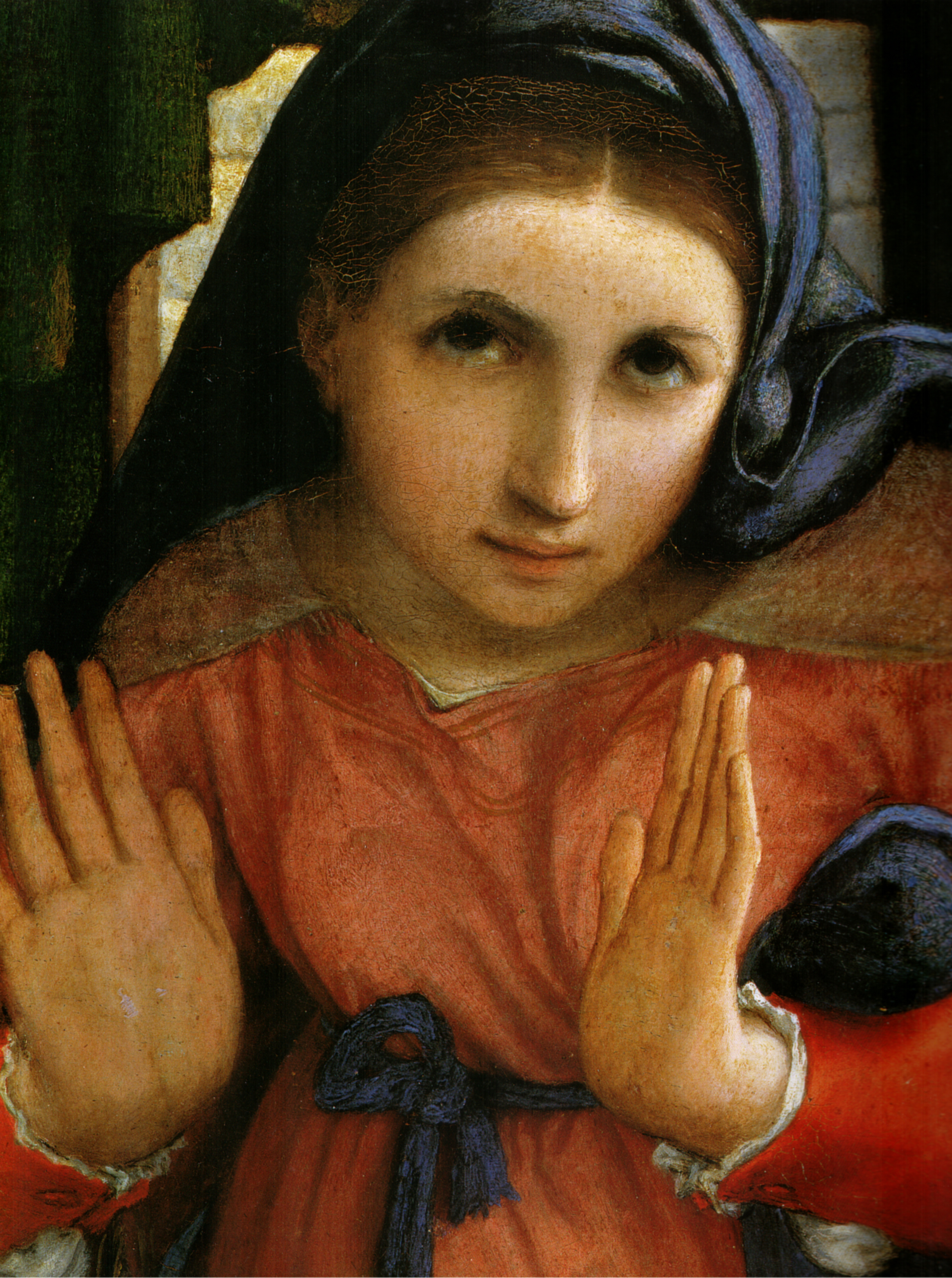
Detail of the Virgin

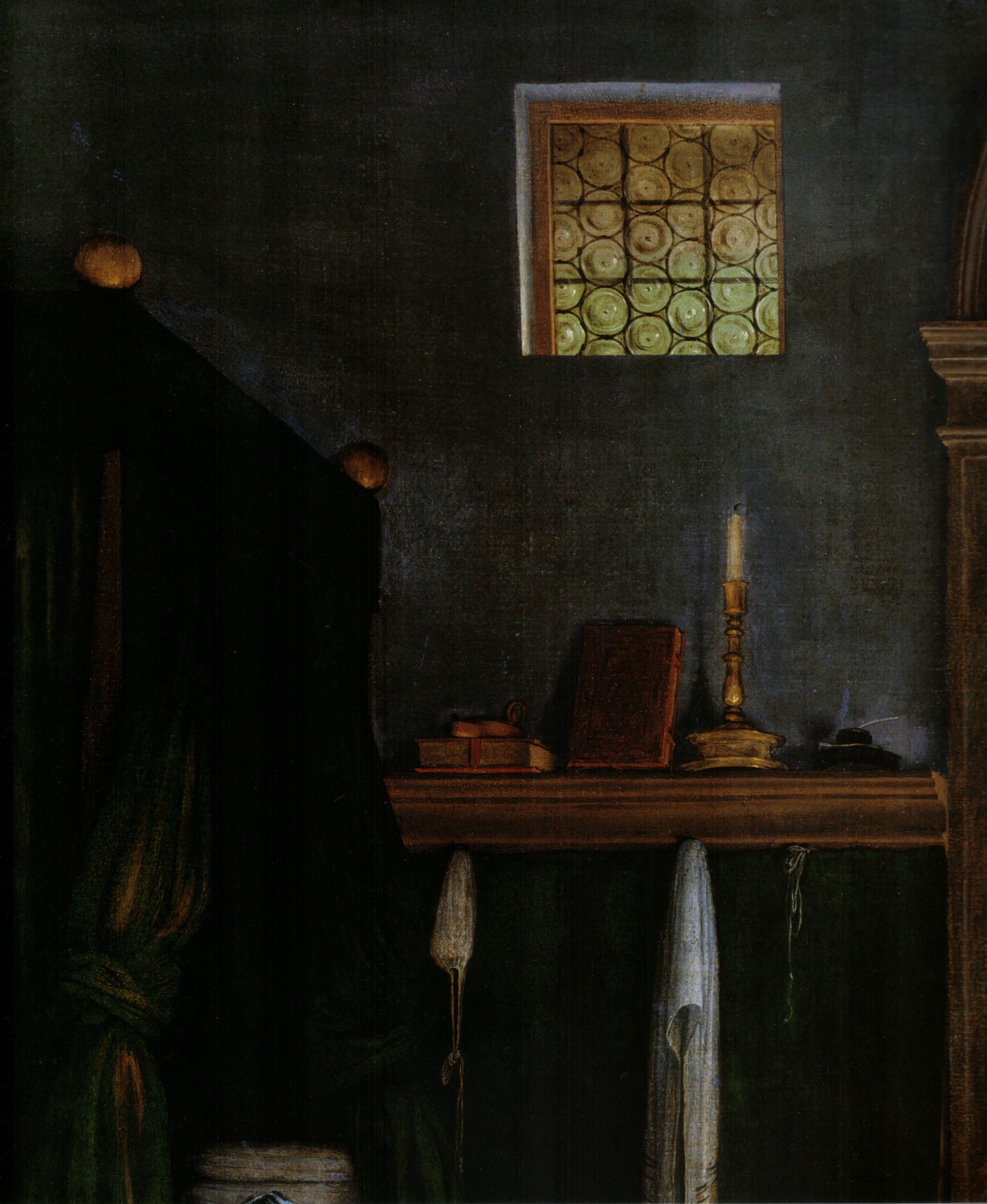
Detail of the shelf and window

The Madonna who faces the viewer and the angel who tries to draw her attention are taken instead from Titian works. According to Italian art historian Giulio Carlo Argan:

Titian's Virgin is a praying queen who nobly turns to receive the divine messenger in her palace. Lotto's Virgin is a good girl; the message takes her by surprise while praying in her room; she cannot even turn her head; her gesture, almost a defensive one, is that of somebody who is struck at the back by a sudden call

== See also ==
- Recanati Polyptych

== Sources ==
- Pirovano, Carlo (2002). Lotto. Milan: Electa.
