= Black Scapular =

Scapulars are devotional objects in Christian worship. Black Scapular may refer to:

- Black Scapular of the Passion
- Scapular of the Seven Sorrows of Mary

== See also ==
- Scapular of Saint Michael the Archangel, a scapular that is both blue and black.
