= Scapular of Saint Dominic =

Catholic devotional scapular

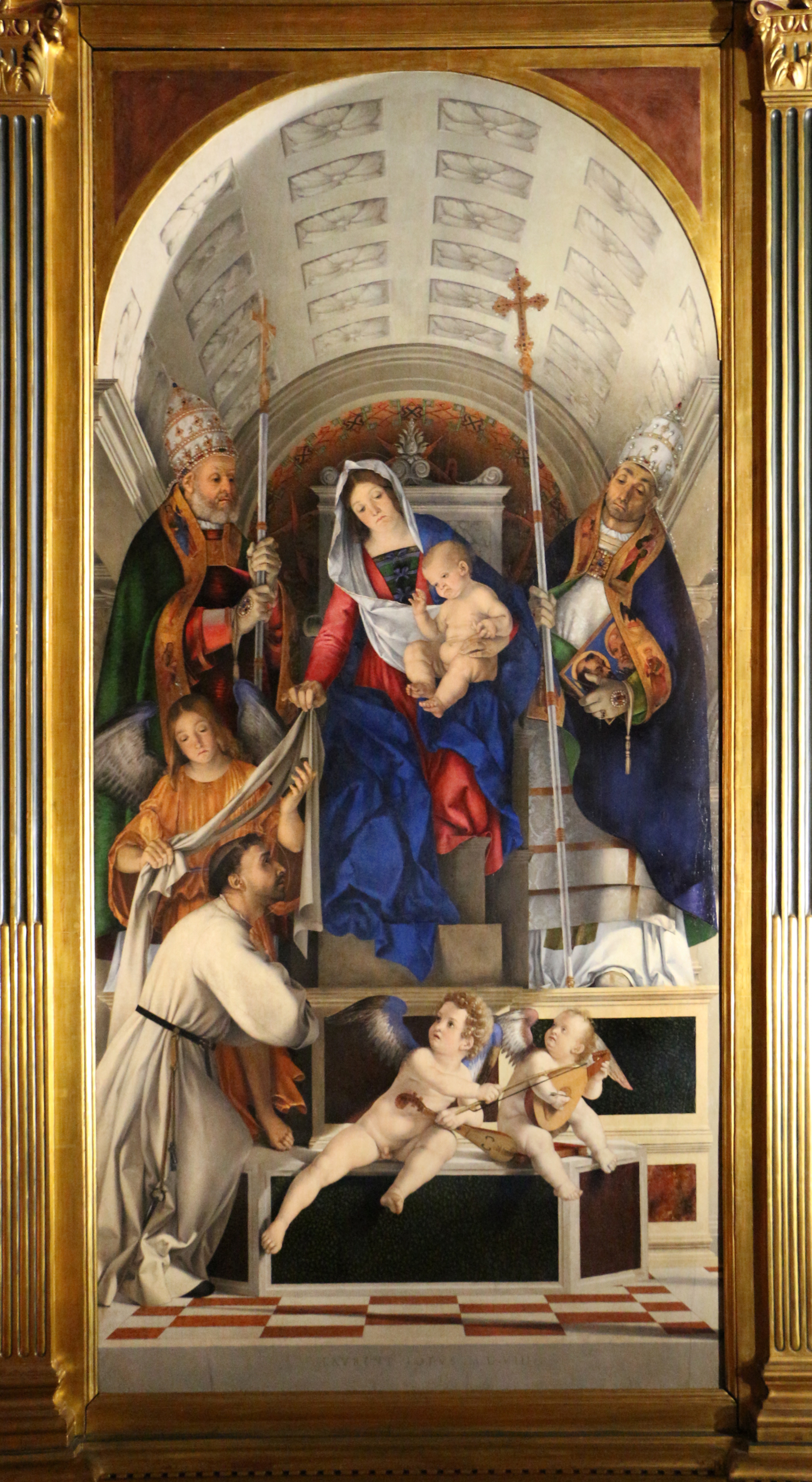
Our Lady bestowing the scapular on St. Dominic

The Scapular of St. Dominic is a Catholic devotional scapular. This scapular was approved by Pope Pius X in 1903.

== History ==
Dominican tradition holds that the white scapular that is part of the habit of the order was conferred on them by the Blessed Virgin. This forms the focus of Lorenzo Lotto's 1508 Recanati Polyptych, painted for the church of San Domenico, Recanati.

Michael J. McGivney, founder of the Knights of Columbus was a friend of the Dominicans, who began to serve St. Mary’s in 1886, two years after McGivney was assigned to St. Thomas Church in Thomaston, Connecticut. He died four years later of pneumonia at the age of thirty-eight. McGivney was particularly devoted to the Holy Rosary and, when his body was interred in St. Mary’s Church in 1982, he was found wearing the white scapular of St. Dominic.

== Description ==
The scapular is two white panels, joined by a cord or ribbon. Although no specific image is prescribed for it, the scapulars distributed by the Dominicans in Rome have an image of Dominic kneeling before the crucifix on the front and on the other side an image of Reginald of Orleans receiving the habit from the hands of the Blessed Virgin Mary.
