= San Francesco, Potenza Picena =

Building in Potenza Picena, Italy

Coordinates: 43.36716°N 13.62017°E

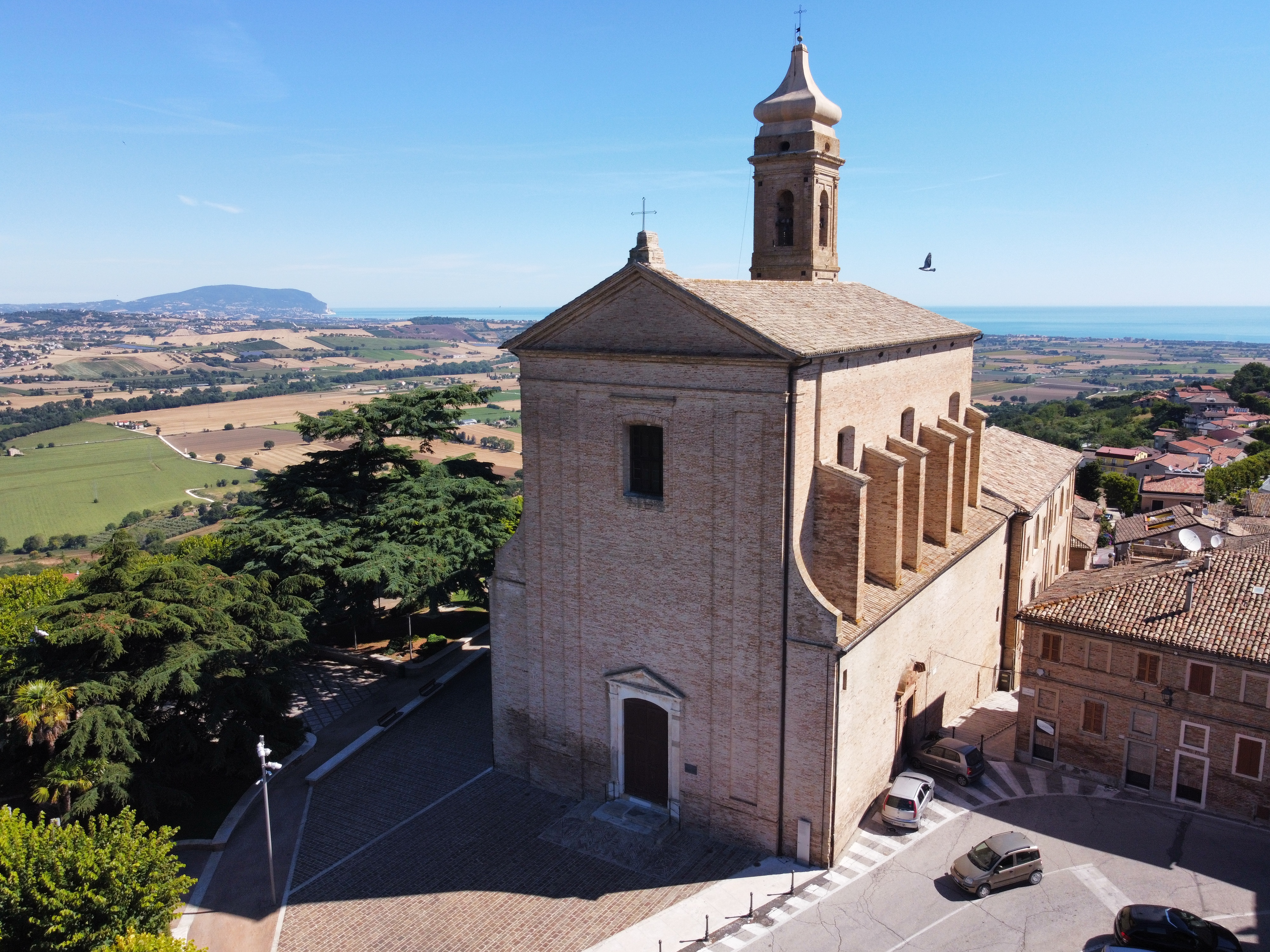
The church of San Francesco

San Francesco is a Roman Catholic former-church located in the town limits of Potenza Picena, province of Macerata, in the region of Marche, Italy.

== History ==
Tradition holds that this at this site, near a church dedicated to San Nicola di Bari, was the spot where St Francis gathered with some fellow monks in the year 1222–1223. This gathering would become the nucleus of the founding of the monastery at the site.

The church, while called San Francesco, is actually dedicated to St Nicholas, represented in the painting above the altar. Papal documents from the first half of the thirteenth century assert the assignment of the property to the Franciscan order. After a short transfer to Monte "Grugliano" (or Coriolanus), the Conventual Franciscans returned to St Nicholas to the 1298. The present church was built from 1766 to 1778. The design of the tall bell tower is attributed to the architect Pietro Augustoni.

An inventory, compiled in 1729 (now in the Archives of Fermo diocese), takes note that the church had two naves and six altars, including the main altar. Among the paintings in the church was an polyptych altarpiece (1493), now dispersed, by Vittore Crivelli. Also lost since that inventory are also the frescoes for the chapel of Santa Venera of the Albanians (1491) painted by Ludovico Urbani. But 15th-century frescoes remain in the wall of the stairs leading to the choir parts of frescoes, supposedly depicting a "Visitation."

The lateral altars have paintings depicting the "Miracle of St Joseph of Cupertino", a "Nativity" and the "Transit of Sant'Andrea Avellino". The two painted canvases, to the sides of the main altar-piece, depict the Papal approval of the Franciscan rule.

The monastery, largely demolished in the second half of the 19th century, in 2016 houses a civic Library, the Historical Archives and the Civic Art Gallery.
