= White Scapular =

The White scapular may refer to:

- Scapular of the Most Blessed Trinity
- Scapular of the Sacred Hearts of Jesus and Mary
- Scapular of Our Lady of Good Counsel
