= Sant'Agostino, Recanati =

Church building in Recanati, Italy

Coordinates: 43°24′07.8″N 13°33′05.0″E

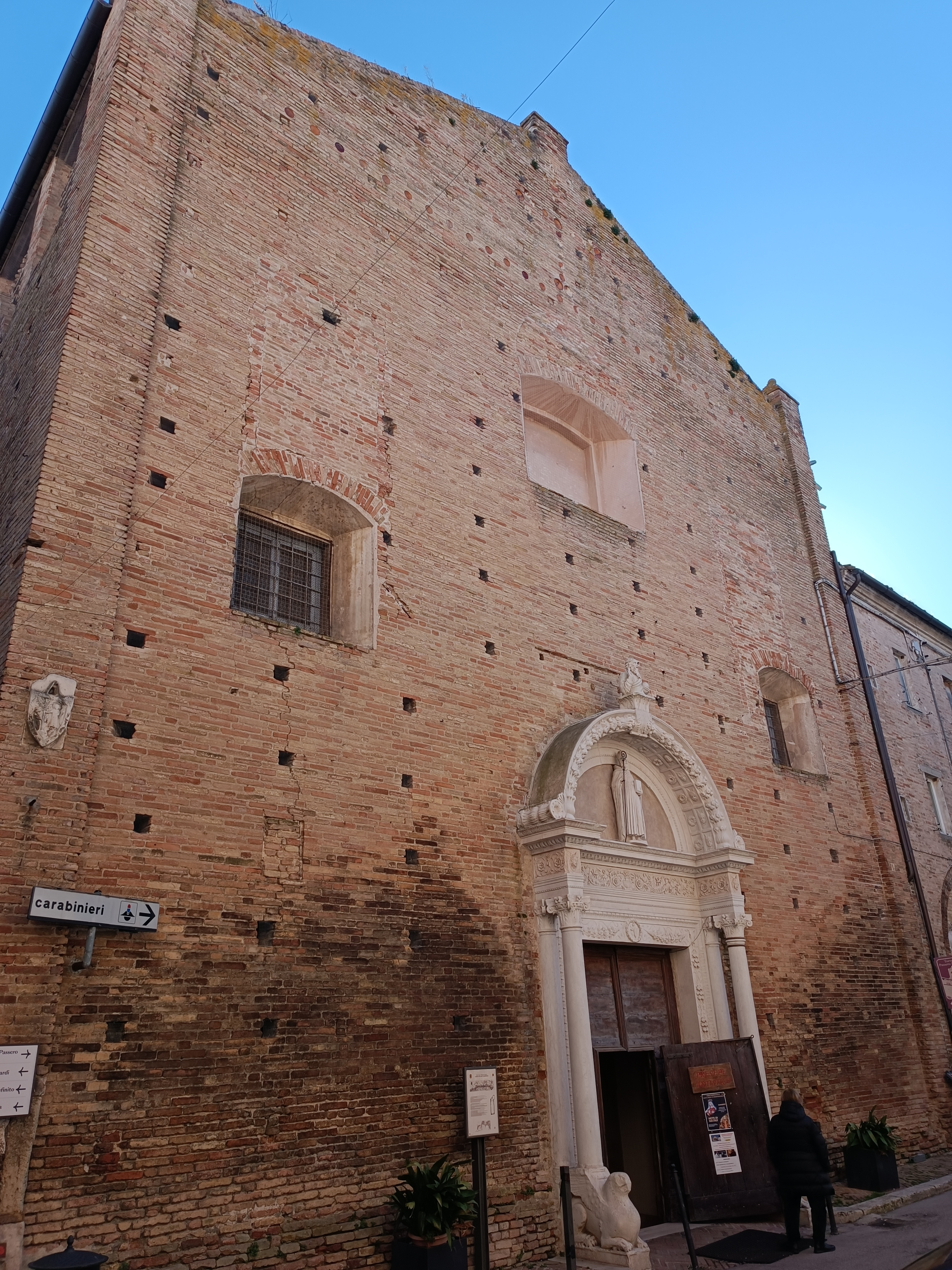
Sant'Agostino Church

Sant'Agostino is a Gothic-style, Roman Catholic church located on Piazzale Giordani #1 in the town of Recanati, province of Macerata, region of Marche, Italy.

== History ==
The church was built in 1270 adjacent to an Augustinian monastery located within the city walls. A century later it was refurbished, but still retains the side buttresses in elegant brick. The rounded portal carved in Istrian marble was completed in 1485 by a sculptor, Giovanni di Fiandra using a design by Giuliano da Majano. It is decorated with a statue of St Augustine and Christ Blessing.

The church interior was refurbished in a Baroque style in the late 17th century, when it was no longer affiliated with the Augustinians. The design was by Ferdinando Galli da Bibbiena.

The side altarpieces were painted by Filippo Bellini, Pier Simone Fanelli, Felice Damiani, Antonio Calcagni, and traces of frescoes by Giacomo di Nicola da Recanati. The crossing of the church has a small cupola. A modern stained glass window has been placed above the main altar. The monastery now houses the Museo di Arte Contemporanea dei Pittori dell'Emigrazione.

Some claim the bell-tower of the church, and not the octagonal town tower, is the inspiration for the tower in Giacomo Leopardi's poem of the Il passero solitario. The poem only states that the sparrow in the poem can see the countryside from this ancient tower.
