= San Vito, Recanati =

Church building in Recanati, Italy

Coordinates: 43°24′05.5″N 13°33′08.8″E

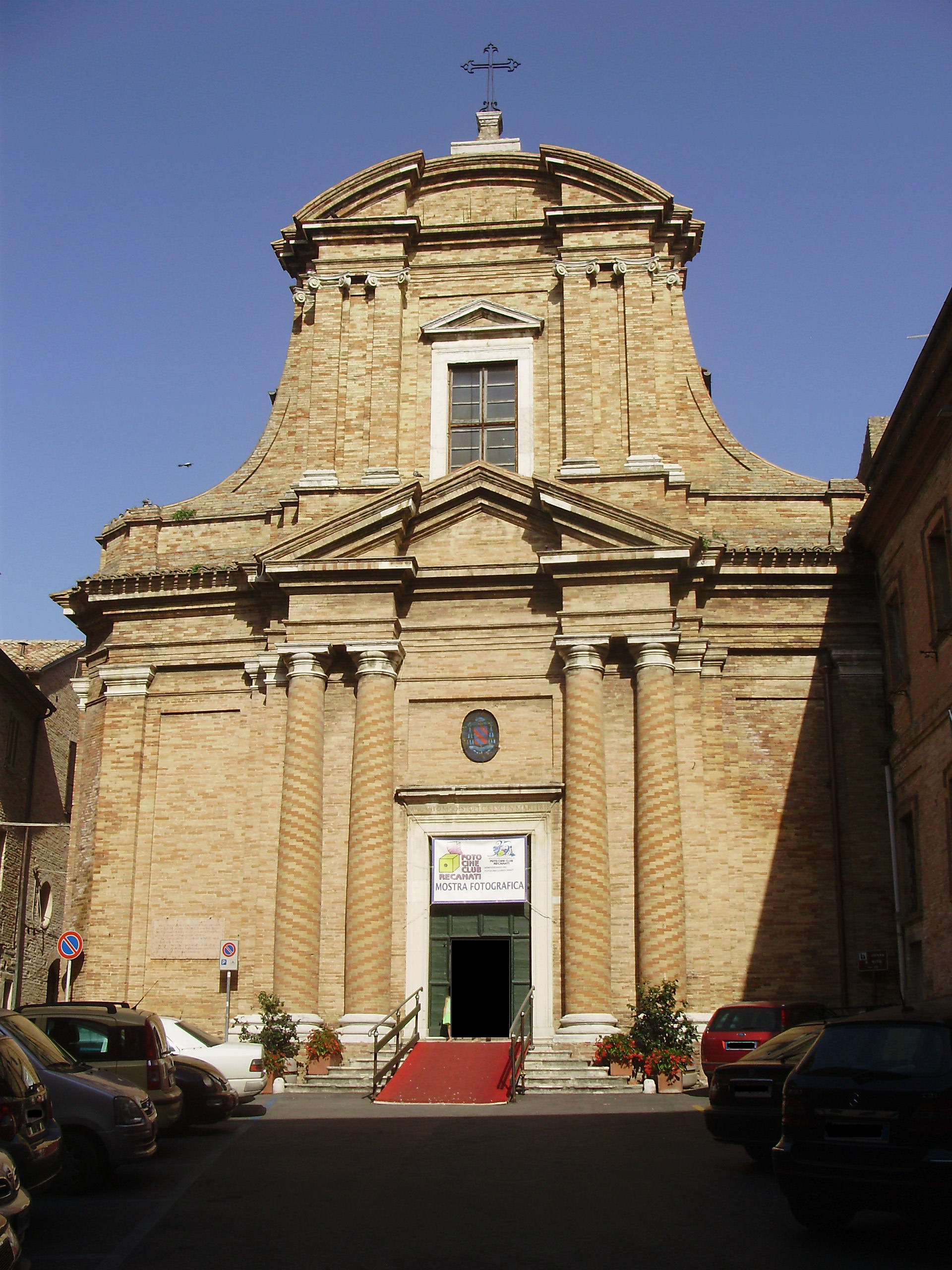
Recanati, church of San Vito: facade.

San Vito is a Romanesque-Byzantine style, Roman Catholic church located in central Recanati, Province of Macerata, Marche.

== History ==
The church was once owned by the Jesuits. In the second half of the 17th century, the church was rebuilt using designs of Pier Paolo Jacometti. The earthquake of 1741 damaged the facade, and in 1771, it was rebuilt in brick with coruscated solomonic columns flanking the portal, using a design by Luigi Vanvitelli. The upper tympanum is rounded.

The church contains paintings by Felice Damiano depicting San Vito al Circo Massimo (1582), by Giuseppe Valeriani: Crucifixion (1550), and by Paolo de Matteis Holy Family and Saints (1727). From the first chapel on the right, one can access the oratory of the Congregation of the Nobili, which holds an altarpiece depicting Presentation at the Temple by Pomarancio (Cristoforo Roncalli) and two canvases by Pier Simone Fanelli, and the Assumption by Latre. A young Giacomo Leopardi read sacred writings in this oratory. The oratory was restored in 2014.
