= San Domenico, Recanati =

Roman Catholic church in Recanati, Italy

Coordinates: 43°24′12″N 13°32′56″E

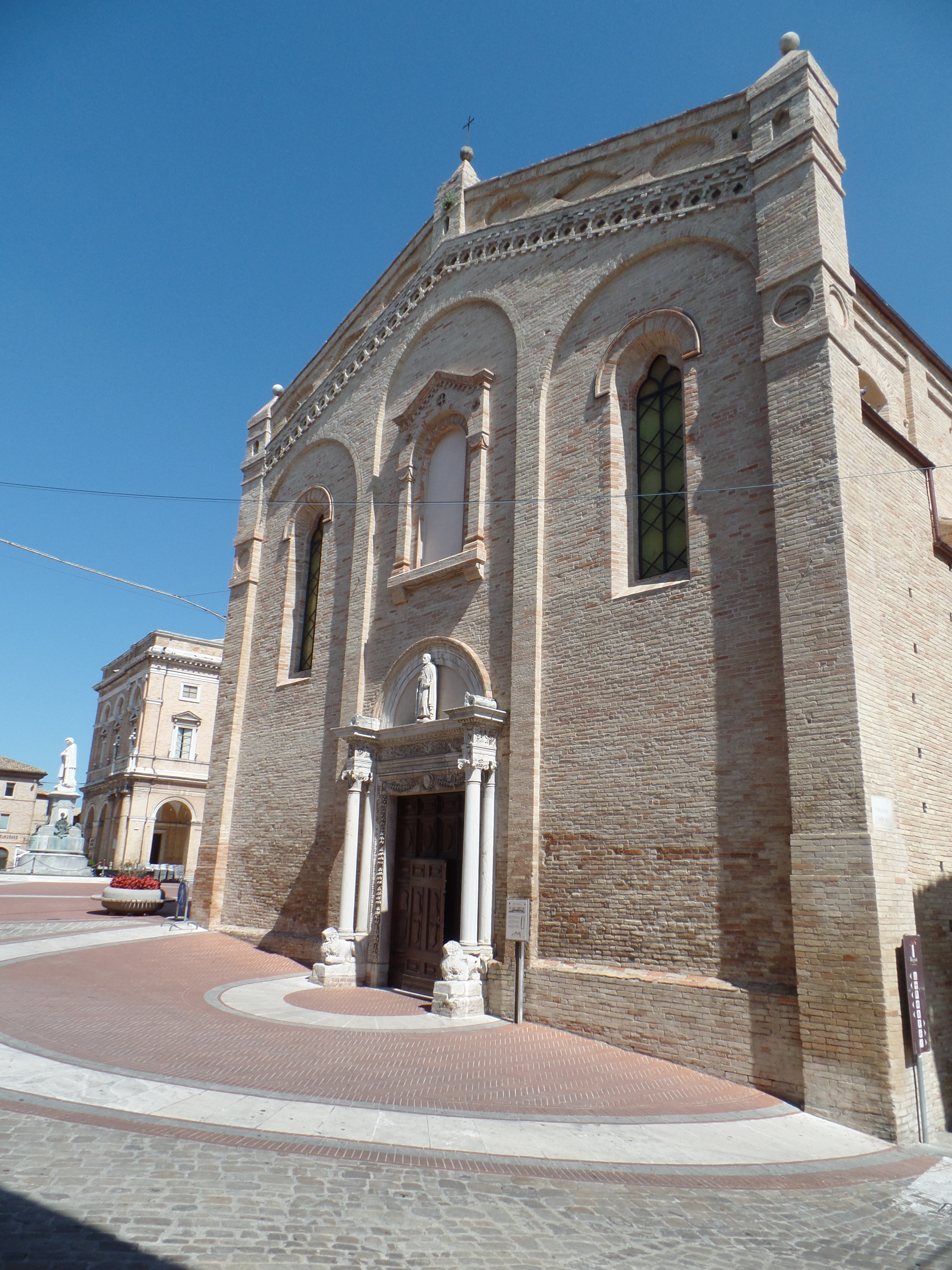
San Domenico, Recanati

The San Domenico is a Roman Catholic church located on Piazza Giacomo Leopardi #3 in the center of the town of Recanati, province of Macerata, in the region of Marche, Italy.

== History ==
The Dominicans arrived in Recanati soon after 1272, and began construction of a church and monastery. The latter no longer exists. This church was first completed in the 14th century presumably at the site of an earlier pagan Roman temple. The brick facade has mullioned windows in Gothic style.

It was rebuilt in the early 18th century, and had further refurbishments.

The interior is said to hold a relic of the Holy Cross transported here by Peter of Verona. This venerated relic was housed in a silver crucifix; when the weather appeared inclement, the crucifix was brought outside to ward away threatening storms.

The first altar on the left has a fresco depicting St Vincent Ferrer (1513) by Lorenzo Lotto. Since the 19th century, Lotto's famous Recanati Polyptych (1508), made for this church, has been relocated, and in 2016 it is housed in the Civic Museum of Villa Colloredo Mels of Recanati.

It is faced by a terracotta statue of St Sebastian by Torregiani.

The portal of the church, made of white Istrian stone, was designed by Giuliano da Maiano. The portal has garlanded frieze above and festoons of fruits along the side. Two columns protrude forward with lion bases and Corinthian capitals. The sculpted portal resembles that of the contemporary church of Sant'Agostino in town. Nearby the church on a rise of the street to the right of the church is the 16th century Porta San Domenico, one of the thirteen gates of the town.
