= Romolo Broglio =

Italian architect and cleric

Romolo Broglio (1655 - 1736) was an Italian architect and cleric living, active in the province of Macerata, region of the Marche, Italy.

He was born in Treia. He is described as a mathematician and scholar. He designed among others, the church of San Filippo in Recanati and the octagonal church of Santa Chiara in Treia.
