= Villa Colloredo Mels =

Coordinates: 43°24′22.55″N 13°32′34.65″E

Villa Colloredo Mels is a suburban palace located on Via Gregorio XII, on the western edge of the urban center of Recanati, province of Macerata, Marche, Italy. It presently houses the civic archeologic and art museum of the town.

== History ==
The villa was present prior to the 16th century, and was rebuilt in its present form in the 18th century. The staircase was built in the 16th century. The rooms were frescoed in the 18th century.

In the mid-18th century the palace was the property of the aristocratic Colloredo Mels family, a prominent family which included Filippo di Colloredo-Mels as one of its members. The Colloredo, who originated from Friuli Venezia Giulia, married the Countess Delia Maria Silvestri of Cingoli. Their son Fabio, born in 1705, married the Countess Teresa Flamini-Antici thus inheriting the original villa.

The last member of the Colloredo family owning the property was the former-count Rudolf Colloredo who died in 1961. The villa was acquired by the commune, and restorations were begun. The museum was opened in 1998.

== Collections ==
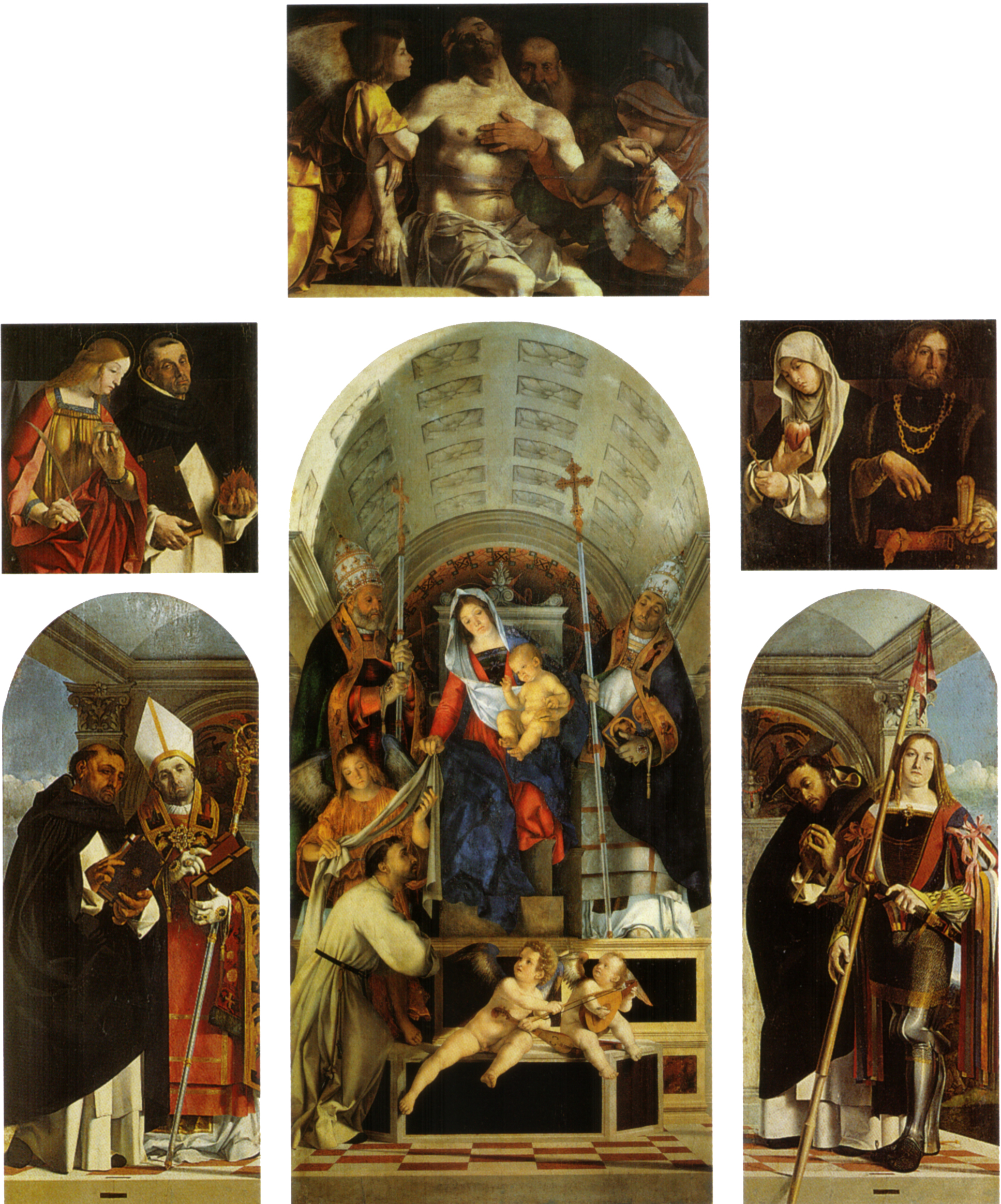
Recanati Polyptych

The archeologic section has findings from Neolithic and pre-Roman cultures, such as the Picena culture of the 9th century BC. Historical collections include objects from Roman through Renaissance period.

Four rooms of the museum are dedicated to Giacomo Leopardi and his era.

The painting gallery has works from the 14th through the 20th century: including works by Giacomo di Nicola da Recanati, Olivuccio di Ciccarello, Felice Damiani da Gubbio, Ludovico da Siena, Vincenzo Pagani, Lorenzo Lotto, Pomarancio, Pier Simone Fanelli, and Biagio Biagetti. The museum has ceramics by Rodolfo Ceccaroni.

Among the highlights of the collections are master works by Lorenzo Lotto such as the Recanati Polyptych (1508) originally from the church of San Domenico, the Recanati Annunciation, a San Giacomo Maggiore, and a Transfiguration.
