= San Filippo Neri, Recanati =

Baroque Catholic church in Marche, Italy

Coordinates: 43°24′19″N 13°32′51″E

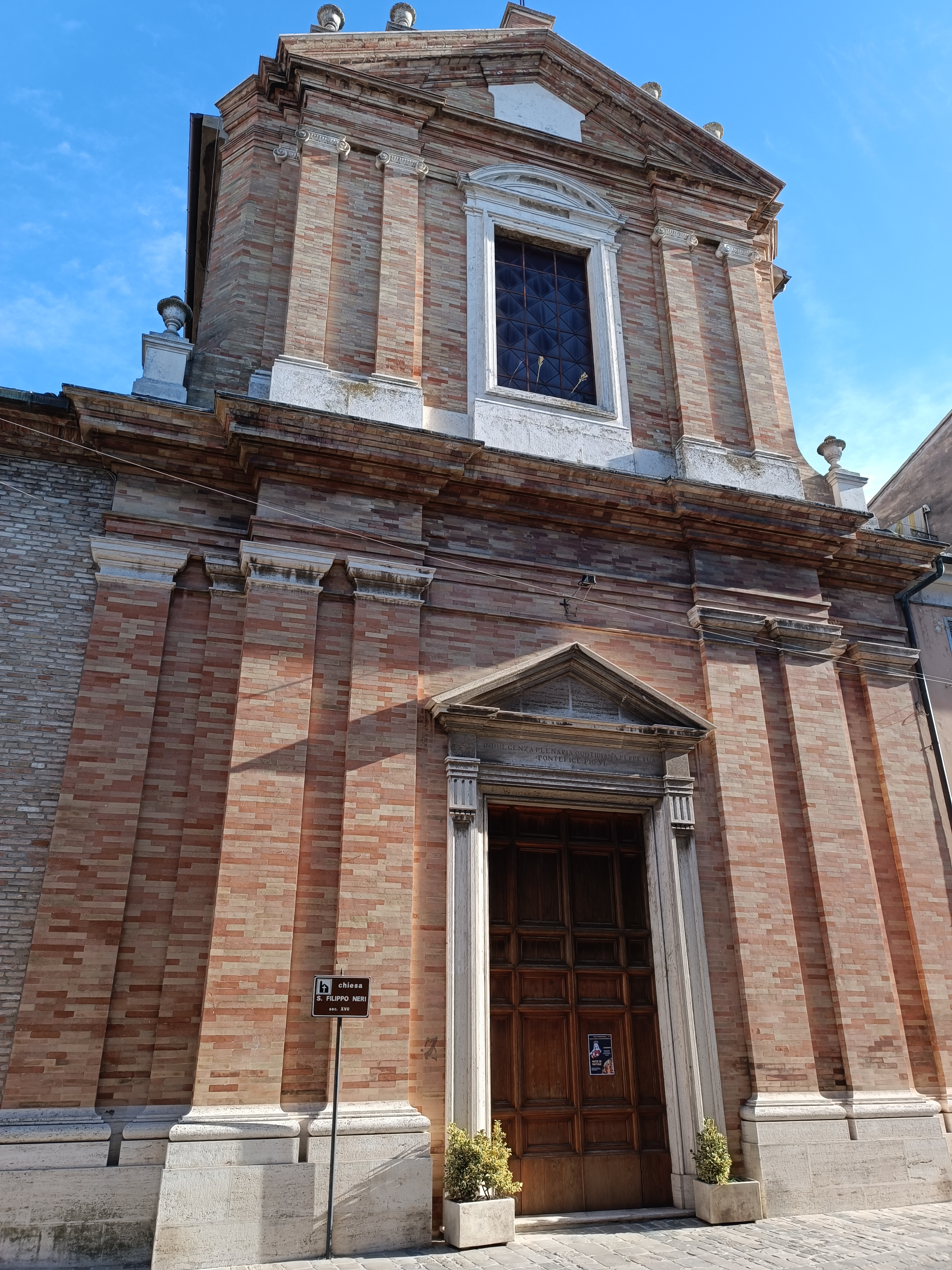

San Filippo is a Baroque-style, Roman Catholic church located on Corso Persiani #44 in the town of Recanati, province of Macerata, region of Marche, Italy.

== History ==
A church was founded here in 1665 by the Oratorians. An adjacent convent was built in 1708 through 1712. In 1722, this larger church was designed by Romolo Broglio. The brick façade is enlivened by white stone elements including the portal, windows, and bases and capitals of pilasters; it was built in 1771 to 1774 using designs by Pietro Augustoni, and an abundance of pilasters in the base.

The interior has two lateral chapels with altarpieces depicting a San Carlo Borromeo by Andrea Pasqualino Marini, and the Madonna with St Joseph, St Teresa of Avila, and the Blessed Sebastian Valfrè by Francesco Saverio Moretti. The apse of the single nave has a massive gilded altar frame with Solomonic columns housing an altarpiece depicting the Ecstasy of St Phillip Neri in the Catacombs by Pier Simone Fanelli.
