= Confraternity of St. Benedict =

Christian devotional garment

In order to associate the faithful, who were not Oblates of St. Benedict, in a certain measure with the Benedictine Order, a Confraternity of St. Benedict was founded in the second half of the nineteenth century, at first by the English Congregation.

== Confraternity ==
The Benedictine scapular is the emblem of the confraternity. Reception is effected by the enrollment of the members and investment with a small blessed scapular of black cloth.

The Confraternity offers an official association to the monastery to those who wish to incorporate Benedictine principles in their lives. Each abbey/priory/convent is independent of each other. St. Gregory's Abbey, Three Rivers in Michigan, is a Benedictine community in the Anglican tradition that sponsors both a Confraternity and an Oblate program.

== Scapular ==
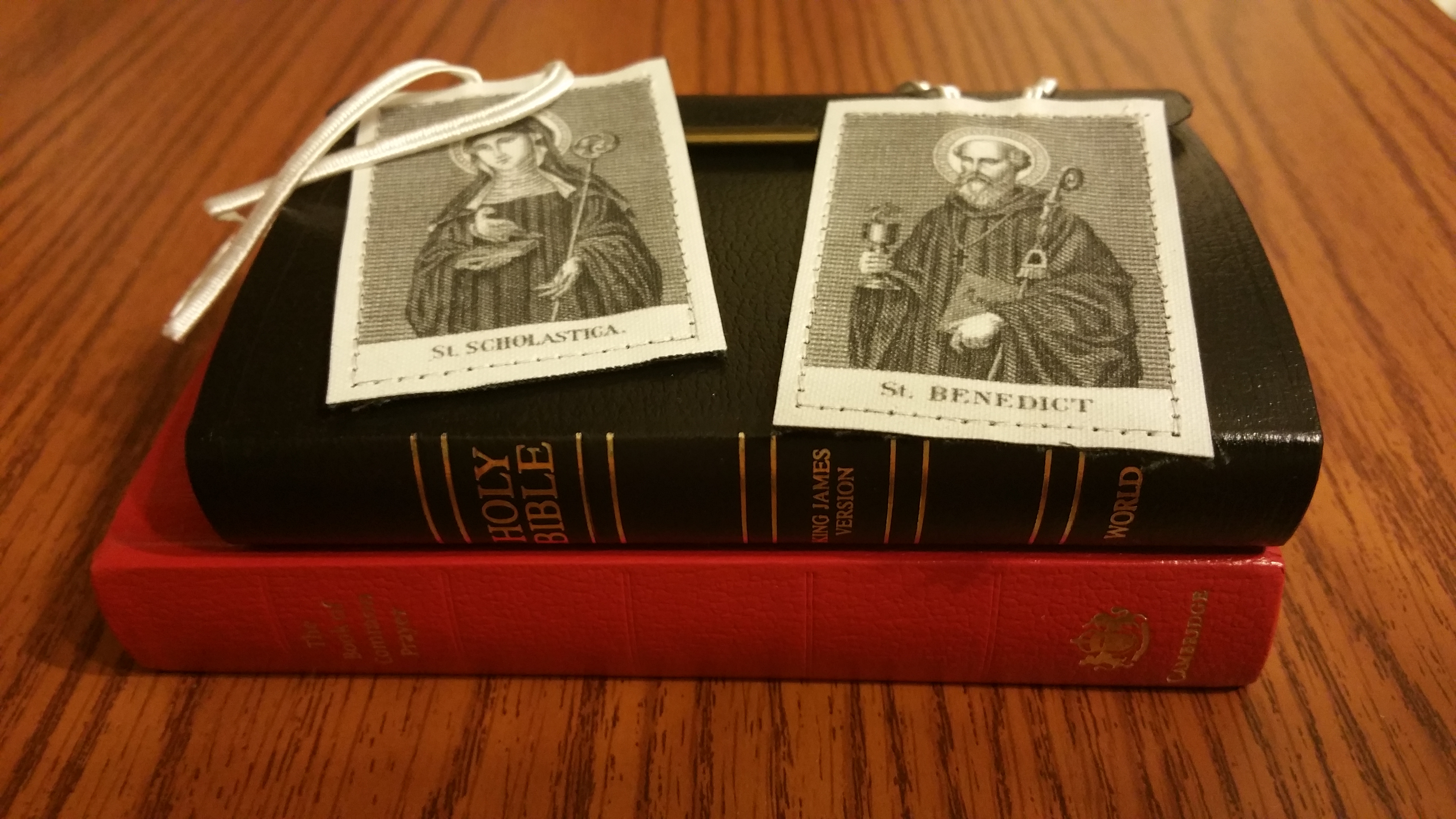
The Scapular of Saint Benedict rests upon the Holy Bible and Book of Common Prayer

The Scapular of St. Benedict is a Christian devotional scapular. This scapular is worn most often by the votarists and oblates belonging to the Order of Saint Benedict, who most often come from the Anglican, Catholic, Lutheran, and Methodist Churches. Others associated with the Order of Saint Benedict may be invested with it.

The front usually has a picture of St. Benedict, but no picture is necessary. The confraternity and the scapular were endowed with indulgences in 1882 and 1883. Since 1950, oblates of the Order of Saint Benedict who reside in warmer climates may wear the Medal of St. Benedict in lieu of the Scapular of St. Benedict, although the latter is still preferred.

== See also ==
- Santi Benedetto e Scholastica
- Saint Benedict Medal
