= Giovanni Domenico Ferracuti =

Italian painter

Giovanni Domenico Ferracuti (mid to late 17th century) was an Italian painter, active in Macerata concentrating on landscapes, especially on wintry landscapes.

He was a follower of Gaspard Dughet and collaborated with figure painter Pier Simone Fanelli in painting for San Giorgio in Macerata.
