= Scapular of Saint Joseph =

The Scapular of Saint Joseph is a Catholic devotional scapular, intended as a reminder of the virtues attributed to Joseph: humility, modesty and purity. It was approved for the Diocese of Verona by the Congregation of Rites in 1880.

== History ==
On 15 April, 1898, Leo XIII granted to the General of the Capuchins the faculty of blessing and investing the faithful everywhere with this scapular. From the Diocese of St-Claude in France use of the scapular was spread by the Capuchins. There are no special conditions, even inscribing the names of its wearers.

== Description ==
Due to the multiple sources for the scapular, the colors may be in combination, having white, gold and purple. The front of the scapular depicts Joseph carrying the infant Jesus, and a lily in the other hand. The back panel features the Papal Arms, a dove (to symbolize the Holy Ghost) and a Cross.

Various indulgences have been granted for all Catholic who wear it by a Rescript of the Congregation for Indulgences, 8 June 1893.

== See also ==
- Scapular
- Rosary and scapular
