= Misericors Dei Filius =

Pope Leo XIII's Coat of arms

Misericors Dei Filius is the title of the 1883 "Constitution On the Law of the Franciscan Third Order" by Pope Leo XIII.

In it Leo XIII declared that wearing of medium-sized scapulars of the "Third Order" or the miniature forms of the smaller devotional scapular entitled the wearer equally to gain the indulgences associated with the order.
