= Recanati Polyptych =

Painting by Lorenzo Lotto

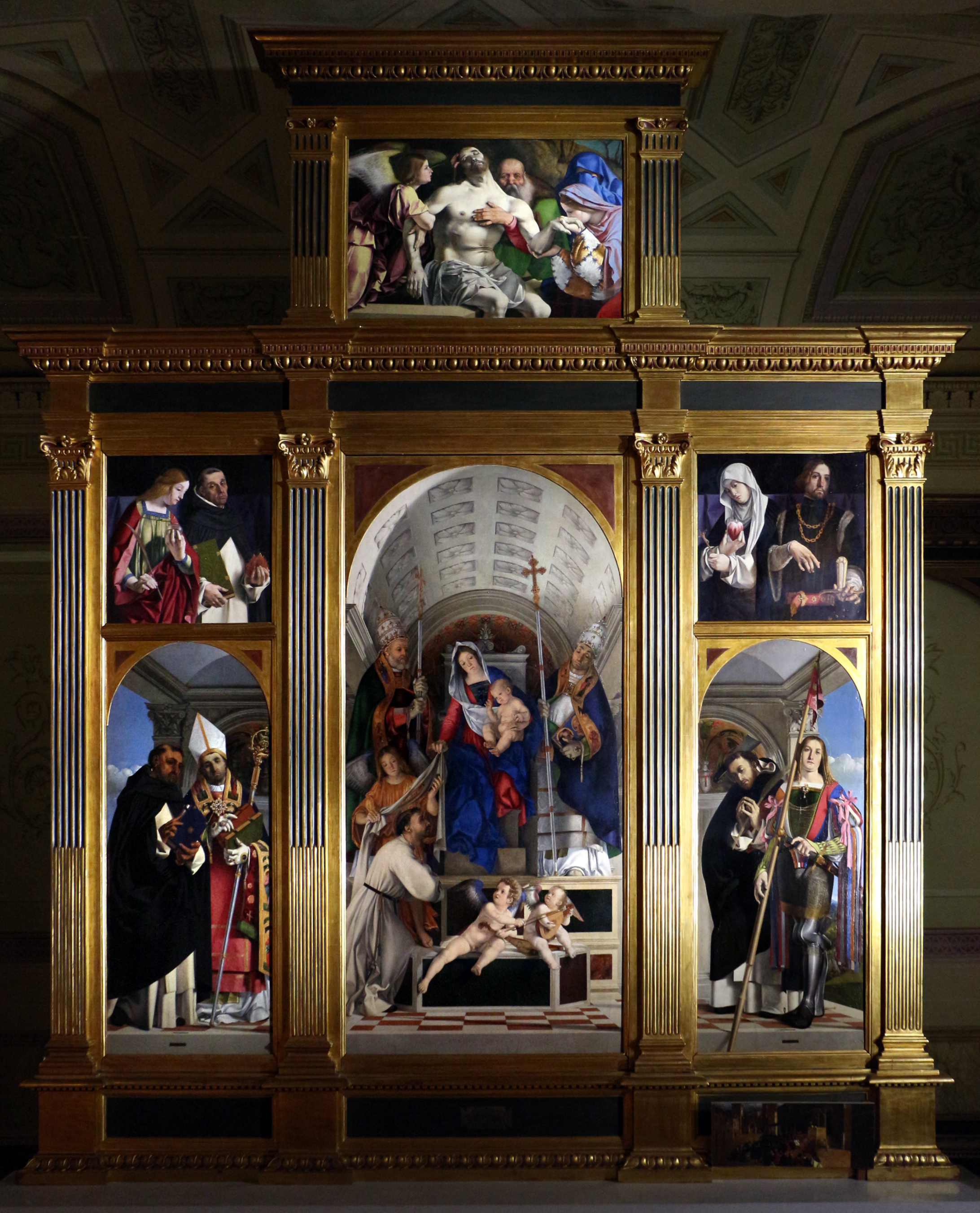
- Artist: Lorenzo Lotto
- Year: 1506–1508
- Medium: Oil on panel
- Dimensions: 307 cm × 242 cm (121 in × 95 in)
- Location: Museo Civico Villa Colloredo Mels, Recanati

The Recanati Polyptych (Italian: Polittico di Recanati) is an oil-on-panel painting by the Italian Renaissance painter Lorenzo Lotto, executed in 1506–1508 and housed in the Civic Museum of Villa Colloredo Mels, Recanati, Italy. The work is dated and signed Laurent[ius] Lotus MDVIII.

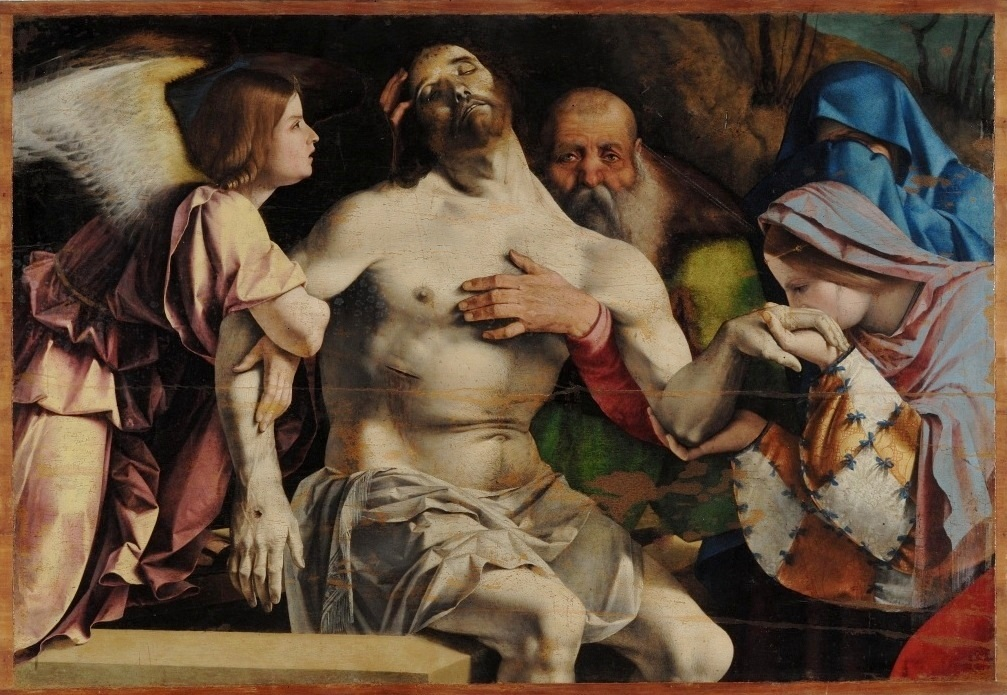
Detail of the Pietà

Lotto began to work on the piece in 1506 as a devotional for the church of San Domenico in Recanati. The work was seen and described complete and in situ by Giorgio Vasari in his Vite, where he wrote that Lotto "was still young and followed partly the manner of the Bellini, partly that of Giorgione". By 1861, the polyptych was disassembled, but was later recomposed and transferred to the Communal Art Gallery. San Domenico still contains a Lotto fresco depicting St Vincent Ferrer.

== Description ==
The polyptych includes a larger altarpiece in the center, flanked by two smaller ones in the same shape. At the top are two side panels with saints, and a top rectangular one depicting the Pietà. The polyptych scheme, related to a 15th-century old-fashioned scheme, was perhaps chosen by the friars of the convent. Lotto developed it into a single composition, at least in the lower panels, with a scene set under a loggia with a coffered barrel vault in center and two minor vaults at the sides, while in the background is a landscape representation.

The niches in the background, featuring Byzantine-style mosaics, are inspired by earlier works by Giovanni Bellini, while the checkerboard pavement is an example of knowledge of the geometrical perspective introduced by the Italian Renaissance in the 15th century.

The panels are:

- Madonna with Child, Angels and Saints (center, 227x108 cm)
- Saints Thomas of Aquino and Flavian (left, 155x67 cm)
- Saints Peter of Verona and Vitus (right, 155x67 cm)
- Saints Lucy and Vincent Ferrer (upper left, 67x67 cm)
- Saints Catherine of Siena and Sigismund (upper right, 67x67 cm)
- Pietà (top, 80x108 cm)

The presence of Dominican saints is connected to the order who held the church, while Flavian and Vitues are the patrons saints of Recanati. Saint Dominic himself is portrayed in the central panel while receiving the white scapular from the Virgin. Next to Dominic are two little musician angels, who are scared by him.

== See also ==
- Recanati Annunciation

== Sources ==
- Pirovano, Carlo (2002). Lotto. Milan: Electa.
