= Santa Chiara, Treia =

Church building in Treia, Italy

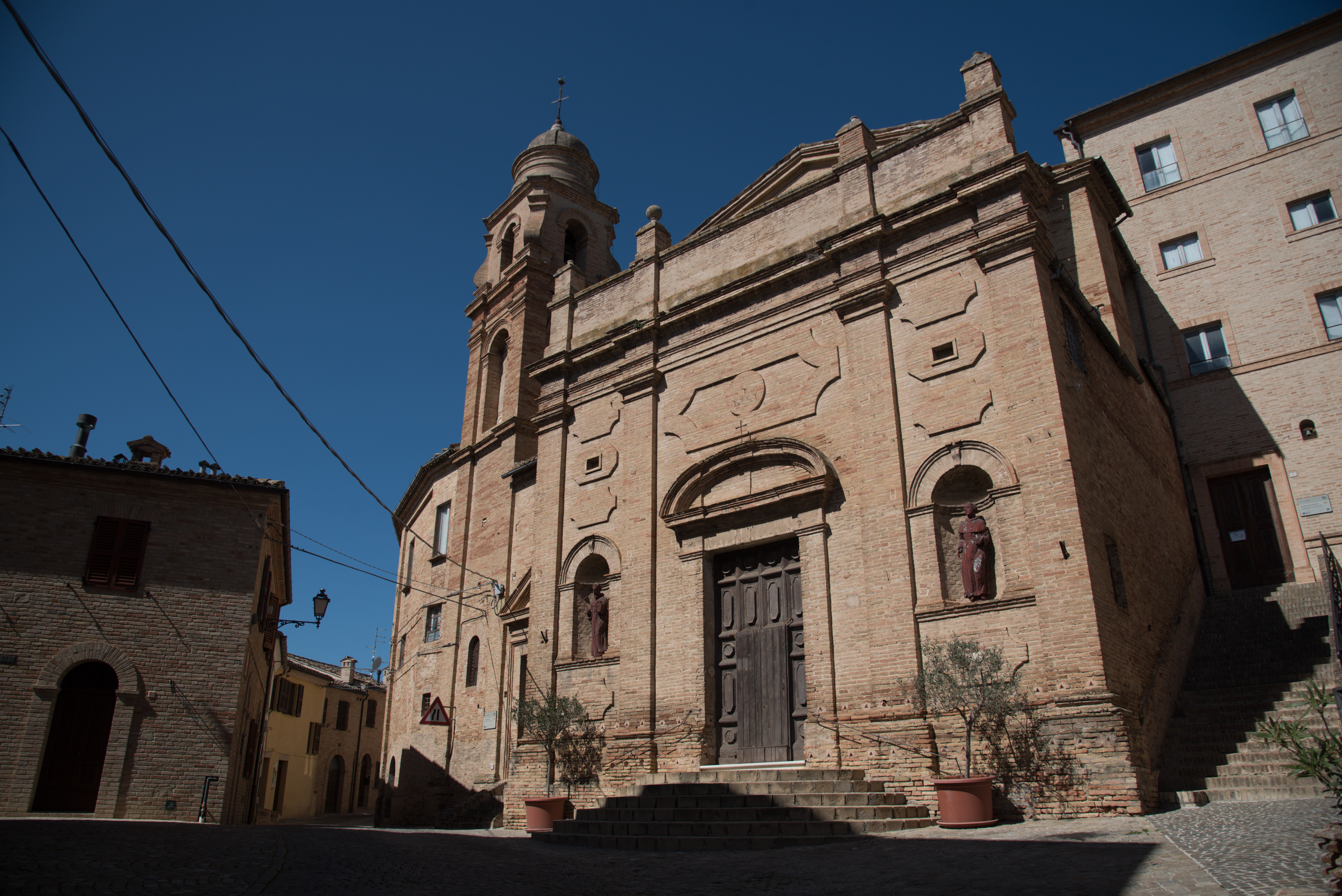
Santa Chiara

Santa Chiara is a Baroque-style, Roman Catholic church located on Piazza Cervigni in the town of Treia, province of Macerata, region of Marche, Italy.

== History ==
The church of Santa Chiara was assigned to a Capuchin order of nuns. In 1710, the church was refurbished by Romolo Broglio. The convent was suppressed by the Napoleonic government, and the convent became a textile mill. The Church was transferred ultimately to the Order of the Visitation of Holy Mary. The church has an octagonal layout. The interiors are sheltered by a decorated ceiling. The main altar has an elaborate gilded frame for a small wooden statue of the Madonna of Loreto.
