= Santa Maria delle Panette, Monte San Giusto =

Roman Catholic church in Monte San Giusto, Italy

Santa Maria delle Panette is a Baroque-style Roman Catholic church and Marian shrine located at the fork of Via Maria Concezione and Via delle Panette, about 400 meters from the western edge of the historic center of the town of Monte San Giusto, province of Macerata, in the region of Marche, Italy.

== History ==
An aedicule with a painting of the Virgin, flanked by St James and St John was located at the site, the home of a charitable Confraternity engaged in providing food to the needy and pilgrims. The distribution of bread (pane) by the fraternity garnered the name of the Vergine delle Pannette to the image. Apparently, tradition holds that a poor peasant girl, after praying to the virgin for bread for her mother, was miraculously rewarded with loaves. This led to popular veneration of the icon.

It was decided by the archbishop of Fermo, Alessandro Borgia, to entrust the local administrator Alessandro Bonafede Seniore to build a church to house the image and faithful. The architect Gaetano Maggi was commissioned a design at the cost of 3000 scudi. Construction began in 1739.

The brick facade has a concave front, and the layout is that of a greek cross. A paraphrased 1771 description of the church by Giovanni Battista Vassalli notes:

(The church) situated not far from (town), circa 20 footsteps of Italian miles in a public road...(The church) is formed to two orders of architecture: the first Doric ... the top Ionic ... Everything is finely ... proportioned in its architecture...the interior ... is built in a square shape, held up by the four pilasters .. which create openings for the main apse and two lateral chapels; each pilaster has two free standing columns, and all is finely squared with stucco.

A further set of corinthian pilasters support four arches that frame the apses of each chapel, well decorated with stucco. The interior is lit by large windows in the chapel and entrance and eight small circular windows in the cupola. The interior is painted in plain colors. The icon of the virgin was repainted in 1830 by Serafino Orsini.
