= Collegiata Santo Stefano, Monte San Giusto =

Church in Monte San Giusto, Italy

Coordinates: 43°14′12″N 13°35′43″E

The Collegiata Santo Stefano is a late-Baroque style, Roman Catholic church in Monte San Giusto, Province of Macerata, region of the Marche, Italy.

The Collegiata was built from 1765 to 1781, using designs of Giovanni Battista Vassalli and Pietro Augustoni.

The chapel of the Madonna Incoronata, patron of the city along with the saints Giusto and Tossano, holds a wooden 16th-century statue of the Madonna with the infant. One of the chapels holds a Madonna del Carmine and Saints painted by Sebastiano Ricci. Another chapel has an altarpiece depicting Saints Giusto and Tossano and the Madonna Lauretana by Domenico Rozzi. The apse has frescoes depicting the Life and Martyrdom of St Stephen (1927) by Ciro Pavisa.
