= Scapular =

Short cloak or cloth pieces, worn with ecclesiastical dress

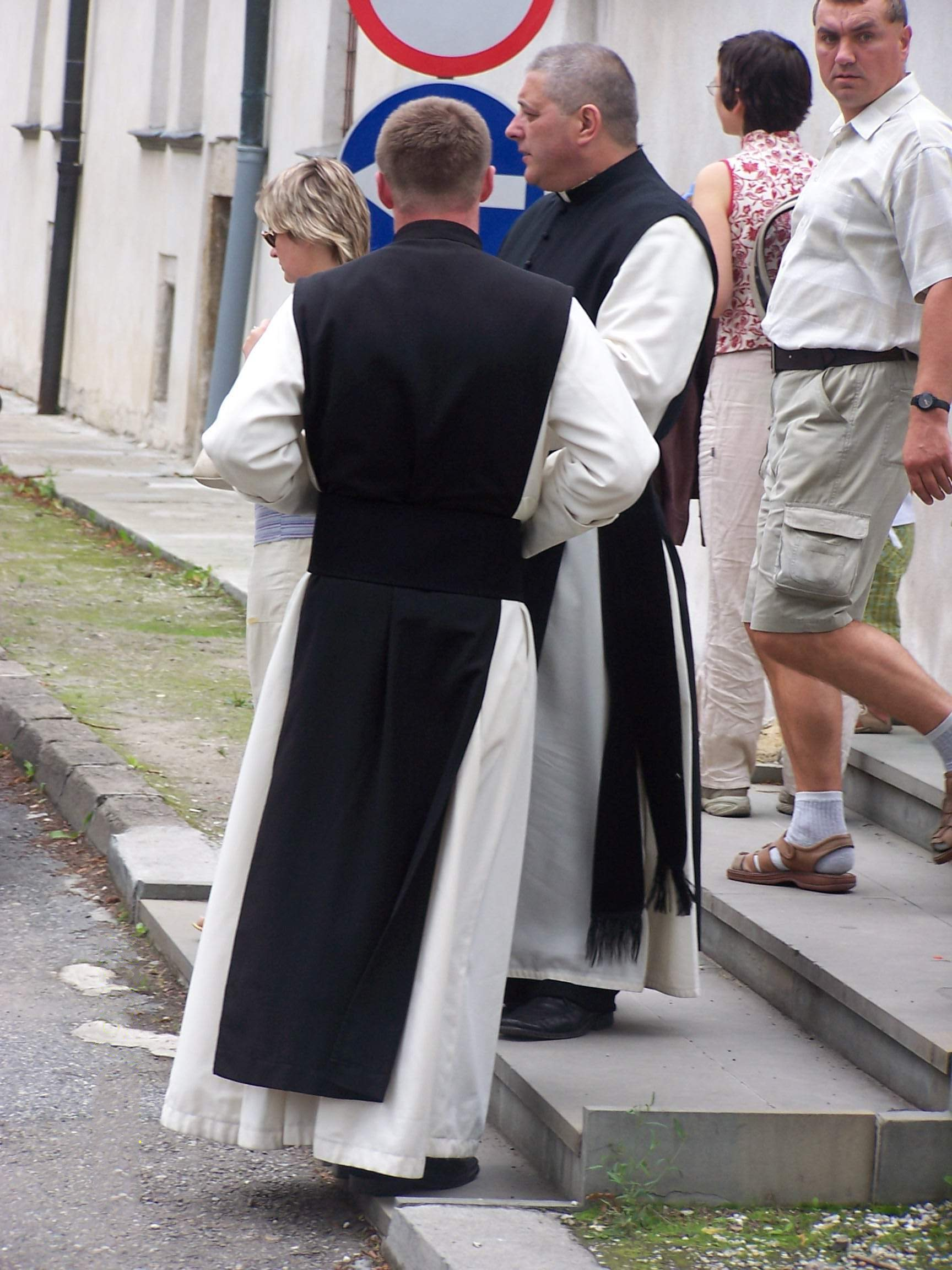
Black scapulars worn by Cistercian monks as part of their religious habits

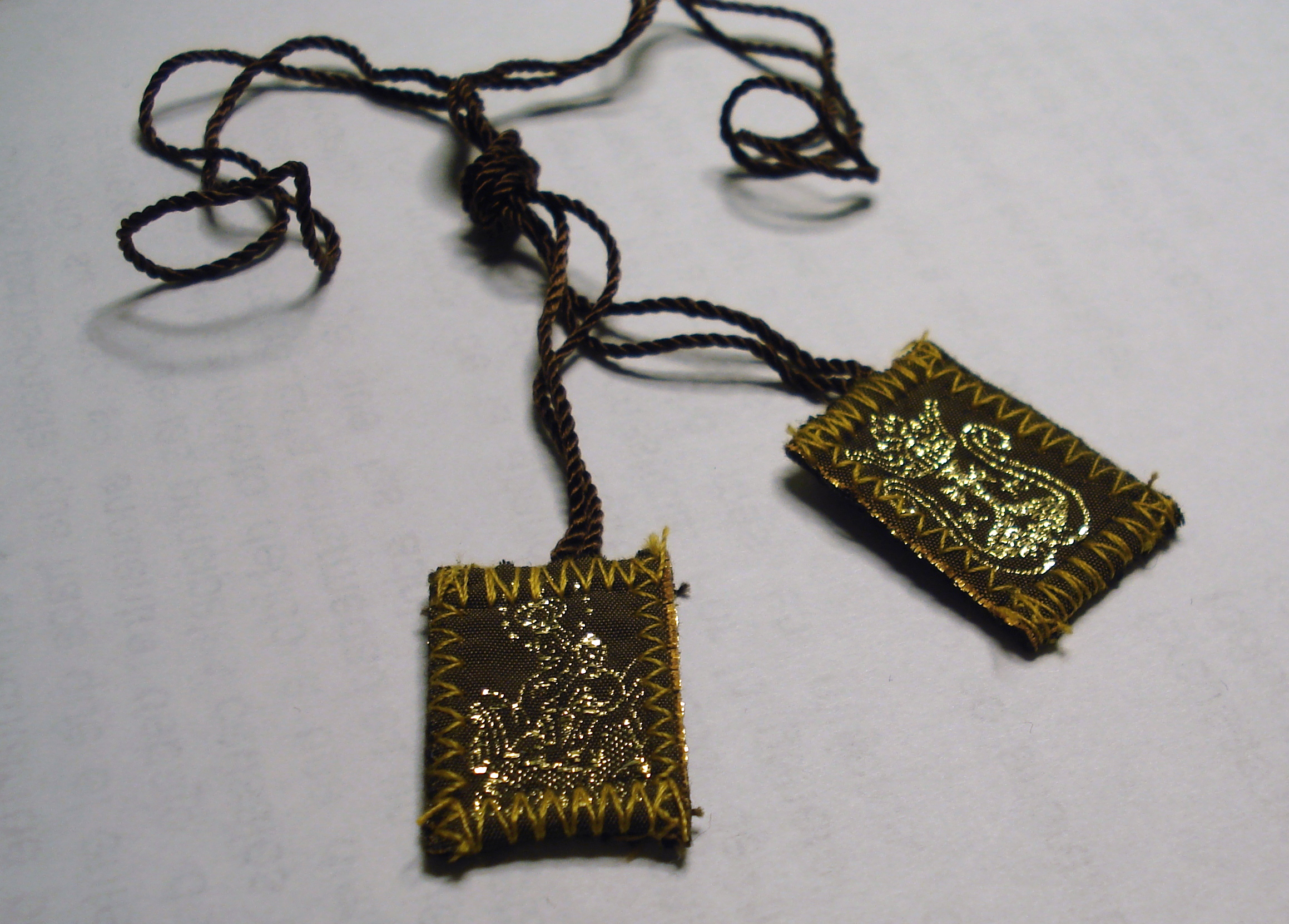
The devotional Scapular of Our Lady of Mount Carmel or "Brown Scapular"

A scapular (from Latin scapula 'shoulder') is a Western Christian garment suspended from the shoulders. There are two types of scapulars, the monastic and devotional scapular; both forms may simply be referred to as "scapular". As an object of popular piety, a devotional scapular serves to remind wearers of their commitment to live a Christian life.

The monastic scapular appeared first, perhaps as early as the 7th century AD in the Order of Saint Benedict. It is a length of cloth suspended both front and back from the shoulders of the wearer, either reaching almost to the hem of the tunic or ends at knee height. It may vary in shape, color, size and style. Monastic scapulars originated as aprons worn by medieval monks, and later became part of the habits for members of orders or confraternities. Monastic scapulars now form part of the religious habit of monks and nuns in many religious communities.

The devotional scapular is a much smaller item and evolved from the monastic scapular. Devotional scapulars may be worn by individuals who are not members of a religious order. The devotional scapular typically consists of two small (usually rectangular) pieces of cloth, wood or laminated paper, a few inches in size, which may bear religious images or text. These are joined by two bands of cloth. The wearer places one square on the chest, rests the bands one on each shoulder and lets the second square drop down the back.

In many cases, both forms of the scapular come with a set of promises made by or to the faithful who wear them. Some of the promises are rooted in tradition.

== History ==
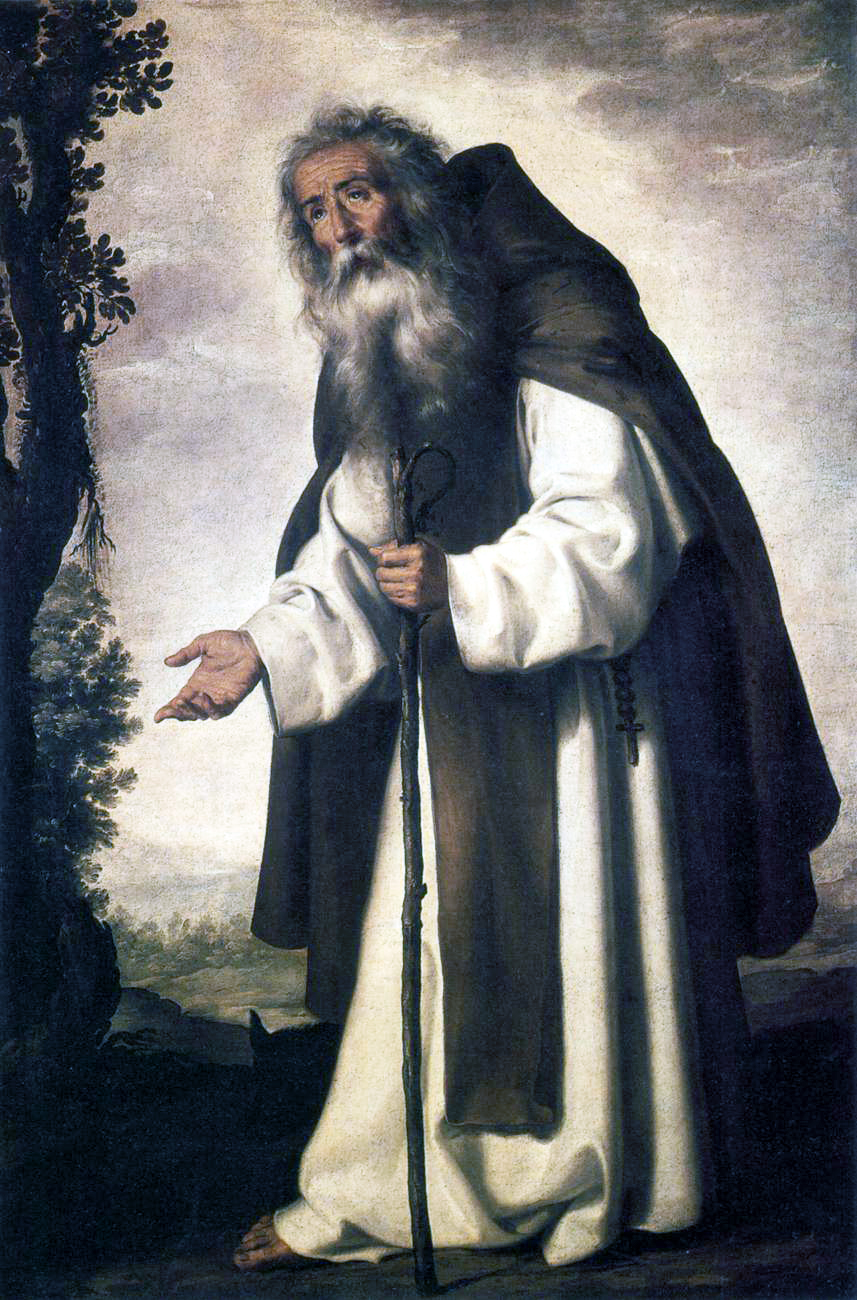
Abba Antony of Egypt depicted wearing a brown monastic scapular and cloak

The scapular may have emerged from an apron-like piece of cloth worn by monks. Item 55 of the Rule of Saint Benedict, dating to the 7th century, refers to the use of the scapular. (Note: Rule of St Benedict (RB) ch. 55.4-6: "… in temperate regions for each monk a "hood(ed cloak)"(? cucullam, cowl) and tunic will suffice – in winter a woolen "hood(ed cloak)"(? cucullam, cowl) is necessary, in summer a thinner or worn one –, and a scapular for work, and footwear: socks (pedules, slip-shoes) and shoes …" Timothy Fry, "RB 1980", p. 262, comments: "This word (scapulare) is found in antiquity only here in RB and in Vita patr. iuren. 3.5, where it appears as a summer garment. De Vogüé 6.916 thinks it is a modified version of the cuculla specially adapted for work. It clearly derives from the Latin scapula, meaning "shoulders", and it may reasonably be concluded that it was a sleeveless or short-sleeved garment … However, A. Guillaumont, "Évagre le Pontique: Traité Pratique" (SC 171, Paris, Éditions du Cerf 1971, p. 488), suggests that the scapular may be the equivalent to the Greek analabos, which Cassian (inst. 1,5) translates uncertainly by three terms: subcinctoria, redimicula and rebracchiatoria, the purpose of which is to fasten the tunic for work.") In the Catholic Church the key elements of a monk's habit eventually became the tunic, the cincture, the scapular and the hood. A nun's clothing included the tunic, the scapular and the head veil. Some authors interpret the scapular as a symbolic apron based on the fact that monks and nuns, when engaged on some manual labor, tend to cover it with a protective apron or carefully tuck it up or throw the front length back over their shoulder to prevent it from getting in the way.

== Varieties ==
=== Monastic scapular ===
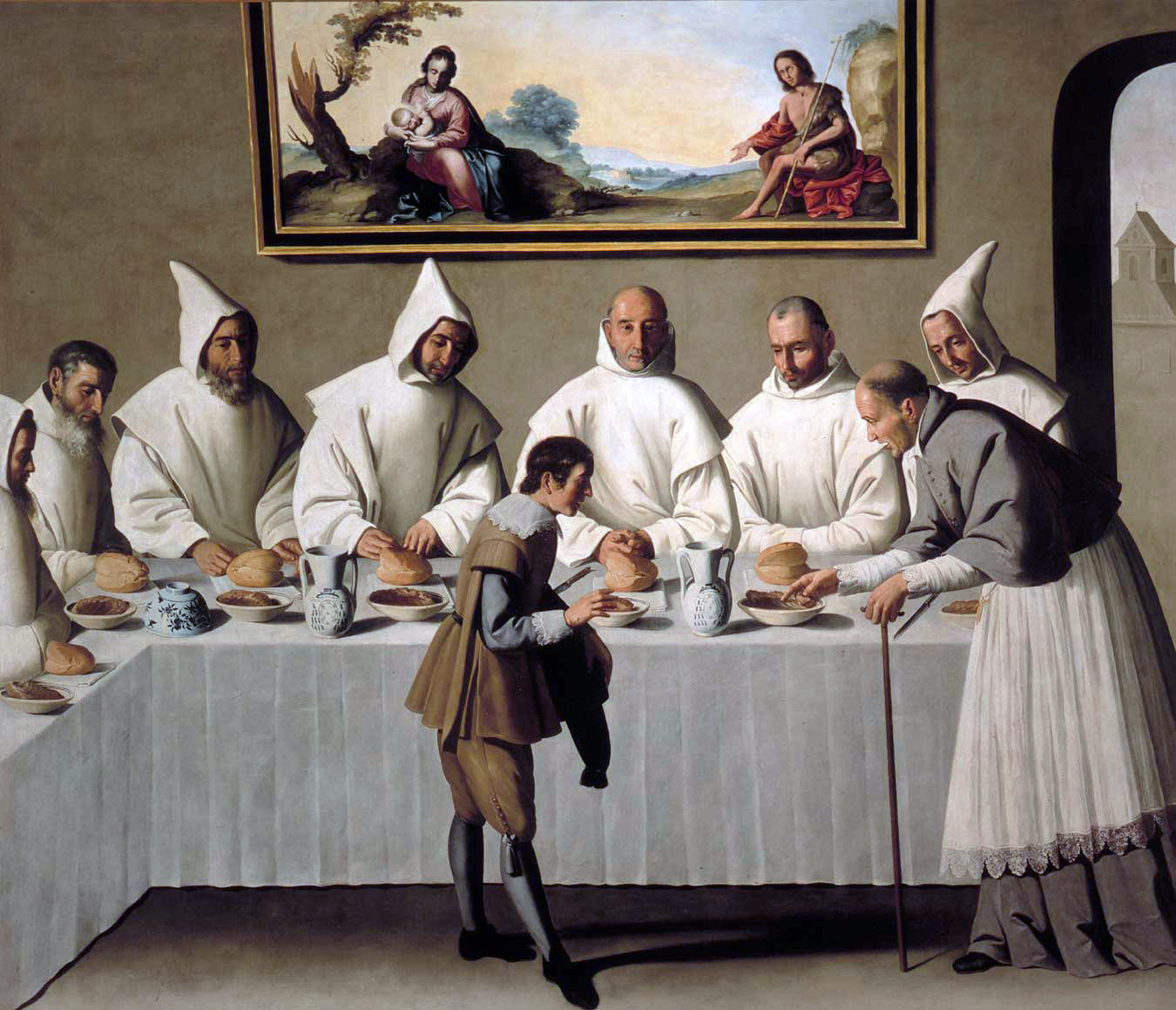
Carthusians in white hooded scapulars, by Francisco de Zurbarán, 1630–1635

Today, the monastic scapular is part of the garb, the habit, of many Christian religious orders, of both monks and nuns. It is an outer garment about the width of the chest, from shoulder to shoulder. It hangs down in the front and back almost to the feet, but is open on the sides (it was originally joined by straps at the waist). It is related to the analavos worn in the Eastern tradition.

Historically, the monastic scapular was at times referred to as scutum (i.e. shield), as it was laid over the head, which it originally covered and protected with one portion (from which the hood afterwards developed). A specific aspect of the use of the monastic scapular from its earliest days was obedience and the term jugum Christi, i.e. "yoke of Christ", was used to refer to it. The term "yoke of Christ" signified obedience and removing a scapular was like removing the yoke of Christ, i.e. rebelling against authority. For instance, the Carmelite constitution of 1281 prescribed that the scapular should be worn to bed under penalty of serious fault, and the constitution of 1369 included automatic excommunication for a Carmelite saying Mass without a scapular.

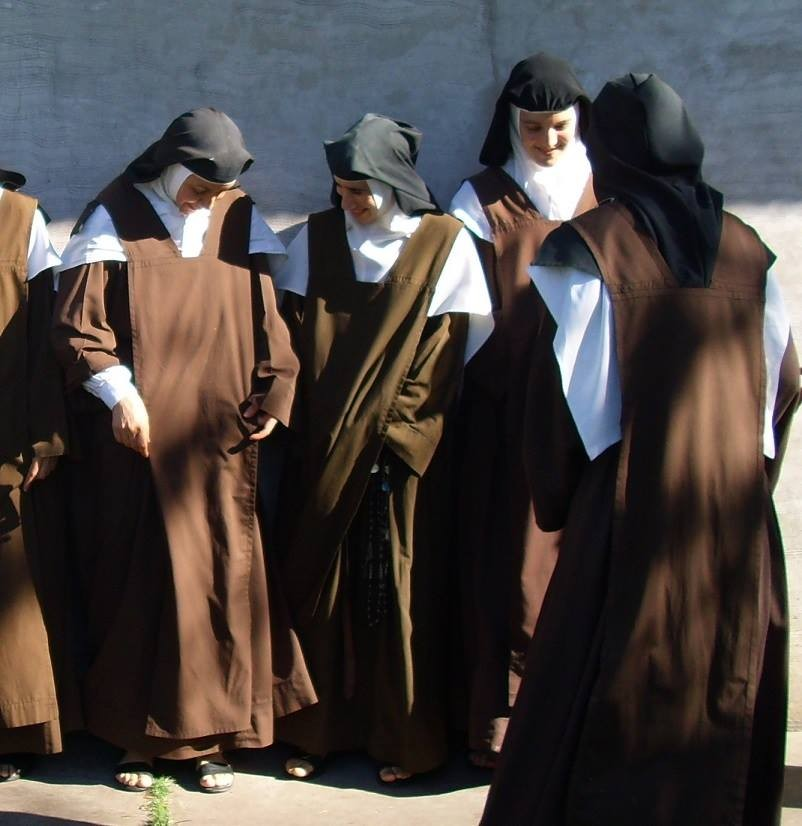
Discalced Carmelites from Argentina wearing their characteristic brown scapular over their tunics

Over the centuries the religious orders adapted the basic scapular as they considered appropriate for themselves, as a result of which there are now several distinct designs, colors, shapes and lengths in use. The Carthusians and others attached a hood to their scapular for the monks, rather than keeping the former a separate item of their habit, while some, like the friars of the Dominicans or the Carmelites, wear it beneath another layer, like a shoulder cape or capuce (that is, the "hood"). The color selection could change over time; for instance, prior to 1255, the Augustinian scapulars for novices were black and those of the lay brethren were white, but thereafter all scapulars but those of the lay brethren had to be white.

In some cases the monastic scapular was used to distinguish the rank or level of the wearer within a religious order. In some Byzantine monastic practices, two levels of fully professed monk or nun exist: those of the "little habit" and those other of the "great habit", these being more senior and not having to do manual labor. In these cases, the "great habit" was simply distinguished from the "little habit" by the addition of a scapular decorated with the instruments of the Passion.

Just as the stole is the vestment that came to mark the office of a priest, the monastic scapular became the equivalent for those in the monastic life and even today, a long scapular identifies its wearer as a member of a religious order.

=== Non-monastic reduced scapular ===
Some authors suggest that the tradition of wearing a reduced form of a non-monastic scapular started in the 11th century with Saint Peter Damian and the monastic scapular was gradually transformed from an item of clothing that was part of the habit of monks and nuns to a smaller item that expressed devotion by individuals, called oblates, who lived in the world, but wished to be affiliated with a monastery.

In the Middle Ages, it became common for Christian faithful to share in the spirituality of the new mendicant orders in an auxiliary sense, sometimes called Third Orders, because they were founded after the initial orders of the friars and nuns. Although these people (called Tertiaries) were permitted to wear the religious garment of a Tertiary, because they had not taken religious vows they were not usually permitted to wear the full habit of the order. With time, it was considered a high honor and great privilege to be granted a small cloth attached by bands which would be worn over the torso in the same manner as the full monastic scapular. Confraternities came to be formed in which people would be granted the wearing of this item as a mark of their sharing in the good works of a particular order. Among the Franciscans, they were known as Cordbearers, due to their also wearing a small cord around the waist in imitation of the one worn by the friar.

After the disruptions of religious life during the period of the French Revolution and the Napoleonic invasions of France and Italy, wearing of the tertiary habit became prohibited. Thus it eventually became common that a smaller form of an order's scapular would be bestowed upon the non-monastic. Rather than a full length of cloth, it consisted of two rectangles (several inches wide, and much larger than a modern devotional scapular) of wool joined by bands in some fashion. These are still worn today by the "Third Order" members of the Franciscans, Carmelites, and Dominicans. In order to gain the benefits of the order, the members must wear these scapulae constantly. However, in 1883 in his Constitution On the Law of the Franciscan Third Order, called Misericors Dei Filius, Pope Leo XIII declared that wearing either these medium-sized scapulae of the Third Orders or the miniature forms of the smaller devotional scapular entitled the wearer equally to gain the indulgences associated with the order. Some religious orders still give a short version (sometimes called the "reduced scapular", but this usage is archaic) of their large scapular to non-monastics that are spiritually affiliated with them. Such short scapulars are designed to be unobtrusive and can be worn under regular clothing at home and at work.

=== Devotional scapular ===
Devotional scapulars are objects of popular piety, primarily worn by Catholics, as well as some Anglicans and Lutherans, designed to show the wearer's pledge to a confraternity, a saint, or a way of life, as well as reminding the wearer of that promise. Some devotional scapulars bear images, or verses from scripture.

Devotional scapulars typically consist of two rectangular pieces of cloth, wool or other fabric that are connected by bands. One rectangle hangs over the chest of the wearer, while the other rests on the back, with the bands running over the shoulders. Some scapulars have extra bands running under the arms and connecting the rectangles to prevent them from getting dislodged underneath the wearer's top layer of clothes.

The roots of devotional scapulars can be traced to the gathering of laity into confraternities for spiritual direction, whereby the faithful would be assigned some badge or token of affiliation and devotion. The image or message on the scapular usually reflects the order's focus, tradition or favored devotion. Devotional scapulars and the indulgences attached to them grew along with the growth of Catholic confraternities during the 17th and 18th centuries.

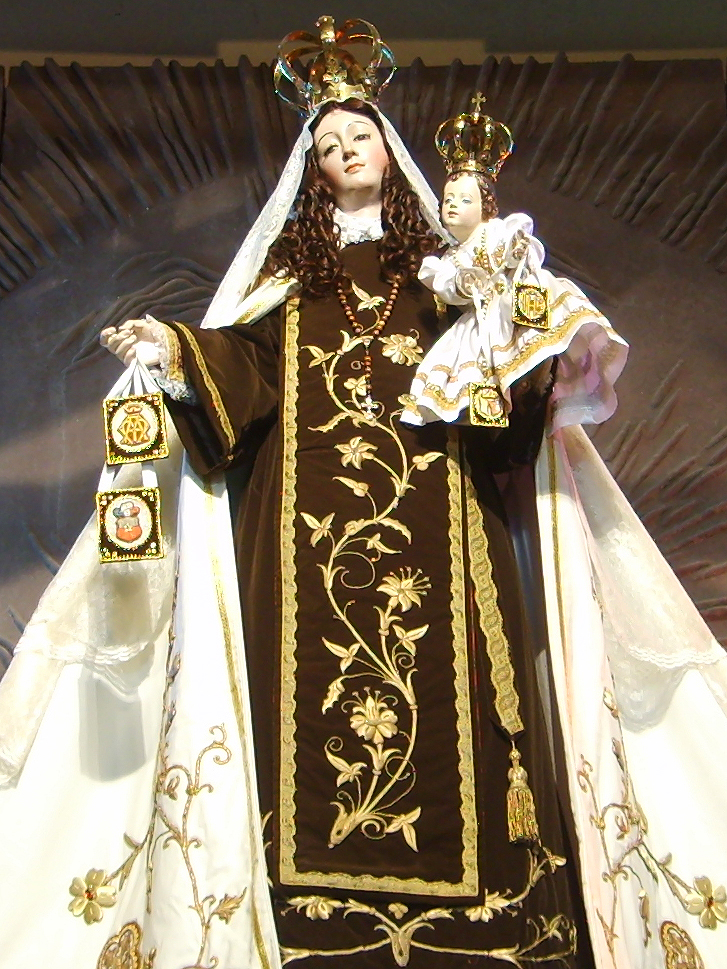
Our Lady of Mount Carmel statue in Chile with a Brown Scapular, an example of the use of the scapular in Marian art.

The fact that specific promises and indulgences were attached to the wearing of scapulars helped increase their following, as was seen with the early example of the Brown Scapular. This promise was based on the Carmelite tradition that the Blessed Virgin Mary appeared to Simon Stock at Cambridge, England, in 1251 in answer to his appeal for help for his oppressed order and recommended the Brown Scapular of Our Lady of Mount Carmel to him and promised salvation for the faithful who wore it piously. Regardless of the scholarly debates regarding the exact origin of the Brown Scapular, it is clear that it has been a part of the Carmelite habit since the late 13th century.

The Blue Scapular of the Immaculate Conception that dates to 1617 was eventually granted a significant number of indulgences, and many graces were promised to those who would honor the Immaculate Conception by wearing the Blue Scapular and live chastely according to their state in life.

During the 19th century, a number of other scapulars were approved. The black Scapular of Our Lady Help of the Sick, (for the Confraternity founded by St. Camillus de Lellis) was approved by Pius IX in 1860. In 1863 he also approved the Green Scapular, which is not from a Confraternity but an image inspired by a vision of Mary experienced by Justine Bisqueyburu from the Daughters of Charity of Saint Vincent de Paul.The green Scapular of the Immaculate Heart of Mary was approved by Pope Pius IX in 1877. In 1885, Pope Leo XIII approved the Scapular of the Holy Face (also known as The Veronica), and elevated the Priests of the Holy Face to an archconfraternity. The white Scapular of Our Lady of Good Counsel received the approval of Leo XIII in 1893 for the purpose of invoking Mary's guidance upon its wearer. He also approved the Scapular of Our Lady of Good Counsel and the Scapular of St. Joseph, both in 1893, and the Scapular of the Sacred Heart in 1900. In 1611, the Servite Order's confraternity and their Black Scapular of the Seven Sorrows of Mary received indulgences from Pope Paul V.

By the early 20th century the devotional scapular had gained such a strong following among Catholics worldwide that Joseph Hilgers, in the Catholic Encyclopedia of 1912 stated: "Like the rosary, [the Brown Scapular] has become the badge of the devout Catholic". In the 1917 reported apparitions of Our Lady of Fátima the Virgin Mary is said to have appeared "with a Rosary in one hand and a scapular in the other". Sister Lúcia (one of the three Fátima children visionaries) stated that the Virgin Mary told her: "The Rosary and the Scapular are inseparable". In the United States "Scapular Magazine" helped enroll one million Americans to pray the Rosary based on the Fatima messages.

While a number of scapulars (e.g. the Scapular of the Holy Face, also known as The Veronica) are entirely Christocentric, the most widespread scapulars (including the Brown Scapular of Our Lady of Mount Carmel and the Blue Scapular of the Immaculate Conception) relate to Marian devotions and consecrations. John Paul II stated that he received his first Brown Scapular of Mount Carmel at age ten when his Marian devotion was taking shape and he continued to wear it into his papacy.

== List of scapulars ==
=== Catholic Church ===
The Catholic Encyclopedia lists 18 small scapulars approved by the Catholic church:

1. The White Scapular of the Most Blessed Trinity (1193)
2. The White Scapular of Our Lady of Ransom (1218)
3. The Brown Scapular of Our Lady of Mount Carmel (1250)
4. The Black Scapular of the Seven Sorrows of Mary (1255)
5. The Blue Scapular of the Immaculate Conception
6. The Red Scapular of the Most Precious Blood
7. The Black Scapular of the Passion (1720)
8. The Red Scapular of the Passion (1846)
9. The Black Scapular of Help of the Sick (1860)
10. The White Scapular of the Immaculate Heart of Mary (1877)
11. The Blue and Black Scapular of St. Michael the Archangel (1880)
12. The Scapular of St. Benedict (1882)
13. The Scapular of the Holy Face (1885)
14. The White Scapular of Our Lady of Good Counsel (1893)
15. The White Scapular of St. Joseph (1898)
16. The White Scapular of The Most Sacred Heart of Jesus (1900)
17. The Scapular of the Sacred Hearts of Jesus and Mary (1901)
18. The White Scapular of St. Dominic (1903)

Of all the types recognized by the Catholic Church the best-known, and perhaps the most popular, is the Scapular of Our Lady of Mount Carmel, sometimes referred to as the Brown Scapular from the color of its bands. The wearing of a devotional scapular has been viewed as a "constant meditation" by Bishop Leo De Goesbriand: "Wherever I am, whatever I am doing, Mary never sees me without seeing upon my body an evidence of my devotion to her." This scapular, with its history in Britain, along with the Scapular of Our Lady of Walsingham are also popular devotions in the Anglican Church. The Green Scapular, "instituted for the conversion of those without faith" is another popular scapular among the Christian community.

=== In Protestant churches ===
Scapular wearing is sometimes found in Protestant churches, including Anglican, Lutheran, Methodist, and Presbyterian churches. Instructions are provided in United Methodist Church allowing scapular to be worn over the alb by anyone lay or clergy, not as a pastoral stole or chasuble, either colored for the Church season or not.

Some Anglican churches use the scapular to designate the difference of vestments between choristers boys and girls, a tradition that continues in Church of South India for women and men.

Lutheran churches sometimes use scapulars as vestments for both men and women servers over cassocks which are regarded as clerical clothing not vestments. Scapulars in Protestant churches do not necessarily have the same meaning as in Catholic church.

Choirs may wear scapular over alb in Lutheran colleges.

== Investment, blessing and rules ==
Though each scapular has its own particular qualifications and usage, the Catholic Church has set down certain rules that pertain to all its types, be they monastic or devotional. A scapular associated with a confraternity must be invested by an ordained representative of that group. A scapular associated with a mystery or devotion may simply be blessed by a priest and given to the wearer. To receive the benefits or indulgences granted the scapular generally must be worn constantly. It may be placed aside for a time but, during that period, the wearer does not receive the scapular's benefits. Should the wearer take up the wearing of it again, the benefits are again conferred.

A devotional scapular must be in good repair with both bands intact. Multiple scapulae may be worn on the same bands, but the bands must be the color of those prescribed by the scapular with the most preeminence, and that scapular must be foremost with the others behind in order of precedence. If a scapular becomes damaged to the point where it cannot be in good repair, it must be replaced. However, it is not necessary for the wearer to be reinvested as it is the devotion of the wearer, not the object itself, that confers the benefit of the scapular.

The 2004 Enchiridion Indulgentiarum grants the partial indulgence to the faithfuls of Christ who use a crucifix or cross, a crown, a scapular, or a medal blessed by a priest.

== See also ==
- Carmelites (Habit and Scapular)
- Green Scapular - approved 1863 and again in 1870
- Our Lady of Good Counsel (White Scapular)
- Rosary and scapular
- Sanbenito
- Scapular of Our Lady of Mount Carmel (Brown Scapular)
- Tabard - a modern scapular worn as an apron, or ceremonially
- The Fivefold Scapular
- The Scapular, Mexican 1968 film directed by Servando González.

== Sources ==
- Rule of St Benedict, ch. 55 (Latin)
- Rule of St Benedict, ch. 55 (English translation)
- John Cassian, Institutes, "On the Dress of the Monks"
