= Scapular of the Sacred Hearts of Jesus and Mary =

Catholic devotional object

The Scapular of the Sacred Hearts of Jesus and Mary (The Scapular of the Most Sacred Heart of Jesus in Agony and of the Most Loving and Sorrowful Heart of Mary) is a Catholic devotional scapular approved at the request of the Archbishop of Marseilles, by the Congregation of Rites in 1900.

== History ==
The scapular owes its origin and spread to the Congregation of the Daughters of the Sacred Heart, founded at Antwerp in 1873. Their petition for the scapular was supported by the Bishop of Marseille and by Cardinal Mazzella, the congregation's Cardinal-protector.

== Description ==
The front has an image of the Sacred Heart of Jesus and the Heart of Mary pierced with by sword. The second segment has a small red cross. Indulgences were granted for the wearing of this scapular in 1901, and increased by Pope Pius X in 1906.
