= Giacomo di Nicola da Recanati =

Italian painter

Giacomo di Nicola da Recanati (active 1433-1466) was an Italian painter, active in the Marche during the 15th century. He paints in a late Gothic style.

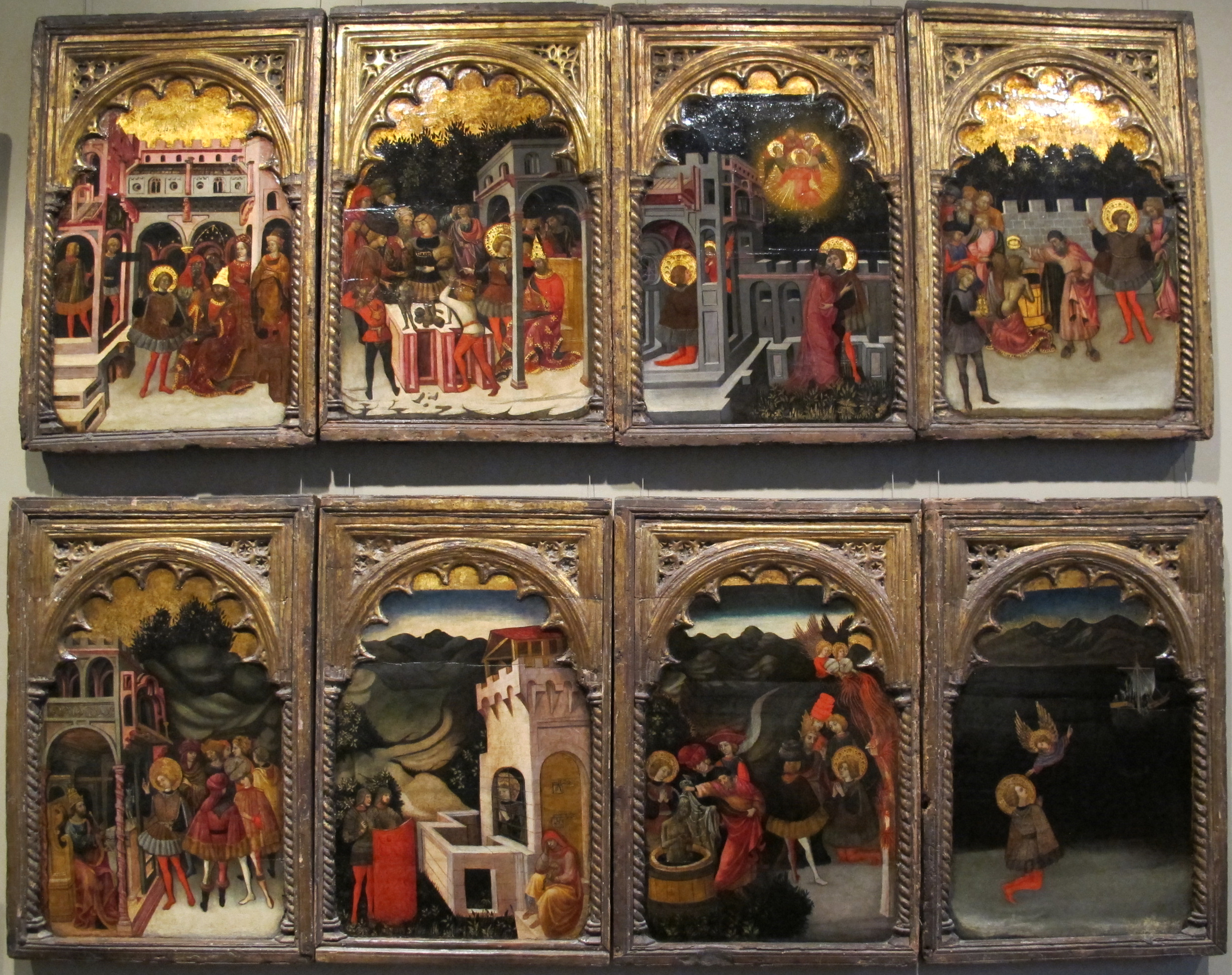
Polyptych panels from Sant'Elpidio a Mare now on display in Louvre in Paris.

== Biography ==
He was born in Recanati, but few details are known of his life. There is a panel at the Pinacoteca Nazionale di Bologna, depicting St Jerome from a polyptych (1433) once housed in the Recanati Cathedral. Other panels are in Avignon and the Museo Diocesano di Recanati.
