= Scapular of Saint Michael the Archangel =

Catholic devotional scapular

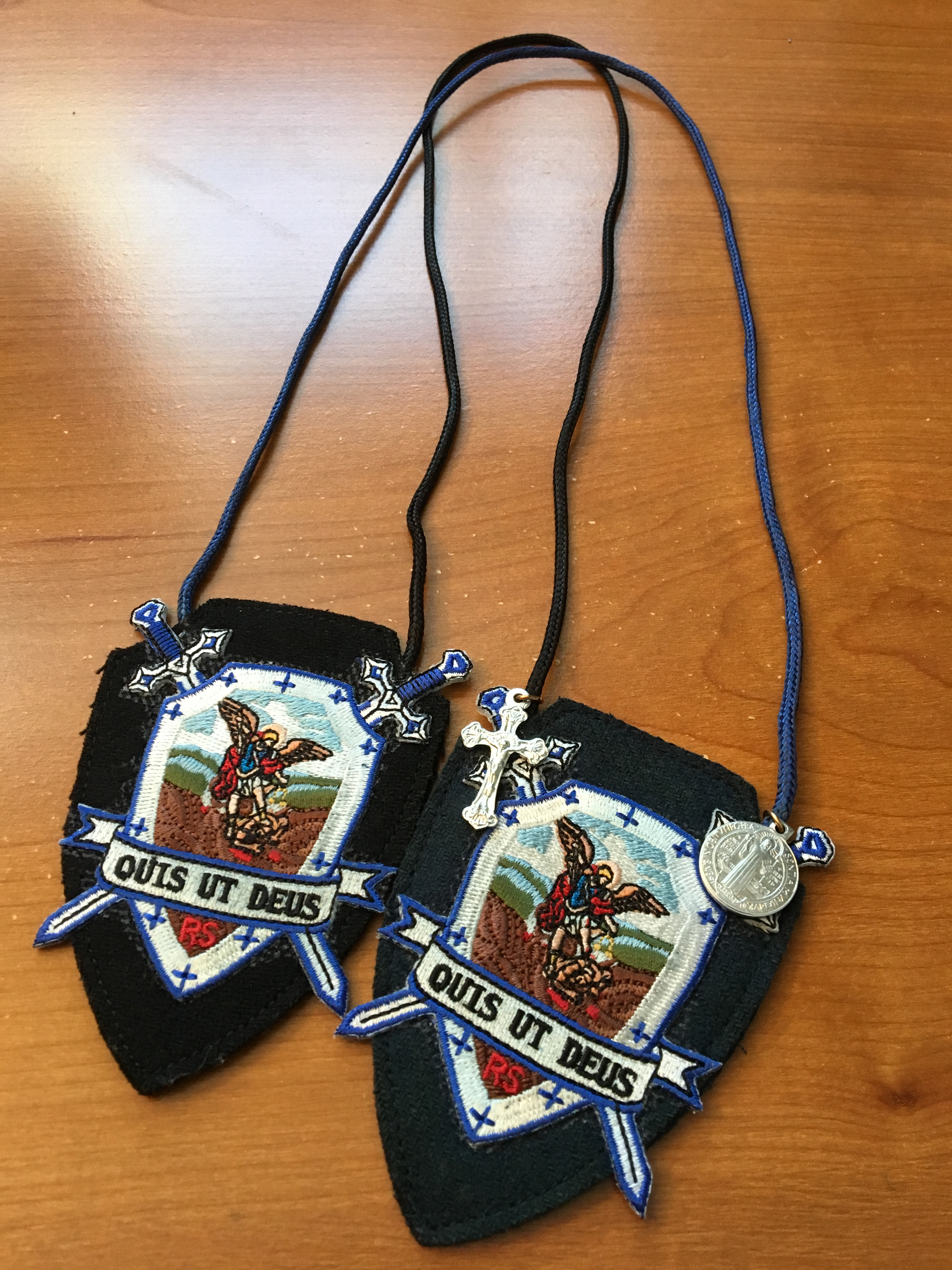
Scapular of St. Michael the Archangel

The Scapular of Saint Michael is a Catholic devotional scapular associated with Michael, the Archangel and originated prior to 1878. It was formerly the badge of the now-defunct Archconfraternity of the Scapular of Saint Michael.

== Archconfraternity of the Scapular of St. Michael ==
Pope Pius IX gave this scapular his blessing, but it was first formally approved under Pope Leo XIII. In 1878 a confraternity in honour of St. Michael the Archangel was founded in the Church of Sant'Eustachio at Rome, and in the following year in the Church of Sant'Angelo in Pescheria. In 1880 Leo XIII raised it to the rank of an archconfraternity, called the Archconfraternity of the Scapular of St. Michael. Indulgences were approved by the Congregation for Indulgences in 1903. Each member of the confraternity was invested with the scapular.

The Archconfraternity of the Scapular of St. Michael is distinguishable from the Brotherhood of Saint Michael, a "Pious Association" based at the Basilica Sanctuary of Monte Sant'Angelo. It was approved by Pope Julius III in 1555.

== Current practice ==
Currently, the confraternity has been extinguished and the blessing and enrollment of the scapular has fallen in the previous reserved rites, so that now it is possible for the faithful to be enrolled in this scapular by any priest. The scapular places the wearer under the special protection of Saint Michael and is considered a “visual prayer.”

The form of this scapular is somewhat distinct, in that the two segments of cloth have the form of a small shield; one is made of blue and the other of black cloth, and one of the bands likewise is blue and the other black. Both portions of the scapular bear the well-known representation of the Archangel St. Michael defeating Satan and the inscription "Quis ut Deus?", meaning Who is like God?, a translation of the Hebrew name of Michael (Mi — "who", cha — "like", el — "God").

== Blessing and Enrollment in the Scapular ==
P: Our help is in the name of the Lord.

R: Who made heaven and earth.

P: The Lord be with you.

R: And with your spirit.

P: Let us pray. Almighty, everlasting God, who graciously defends your Church from the wiles of the devil through St Michael the Archangel, we humbly implore you to bless † and sanctify † this token introduced for arousing and fostering devotion among your faithful toward this great protector. And do you grant that all who wear it may be strengthened by the same holy archangel, so as to vanquish the enemies of body and soul, both in this life and at the hour of death. Through Christ our Lord.

R: Amen

The priest sprinkles the Scapular with holy water, and then bestows it, saying:

P: Receive brother/sister, the scapular of St Michael the Archangel, so that by his constant intercession you may be disposed to lead a holy life.

R: Amen

P: Let us pray: We appeal to your goodness, O Lord that you would hear our prayers and graciously bless † this servant of yours, who has been placed under the special patronage of St Michael the Archangel. Through his intercession may he/she avoid and guard against whatever is displeasing to you, and thus merit in serving you to accomplish his/her own sanctification and that of others. Through Christ our Lord.

R: Amen.

== See also ==
- Scapular
- Saint Michael (Roman Catholic)
- Chaplet of Saint Michael
- Prayer to Saint Michael

== Sources ==
- Rituale Romanum, editio annum 1928
