= Monte San Giusto =

- Comune
- Comune di Monte San Giusto
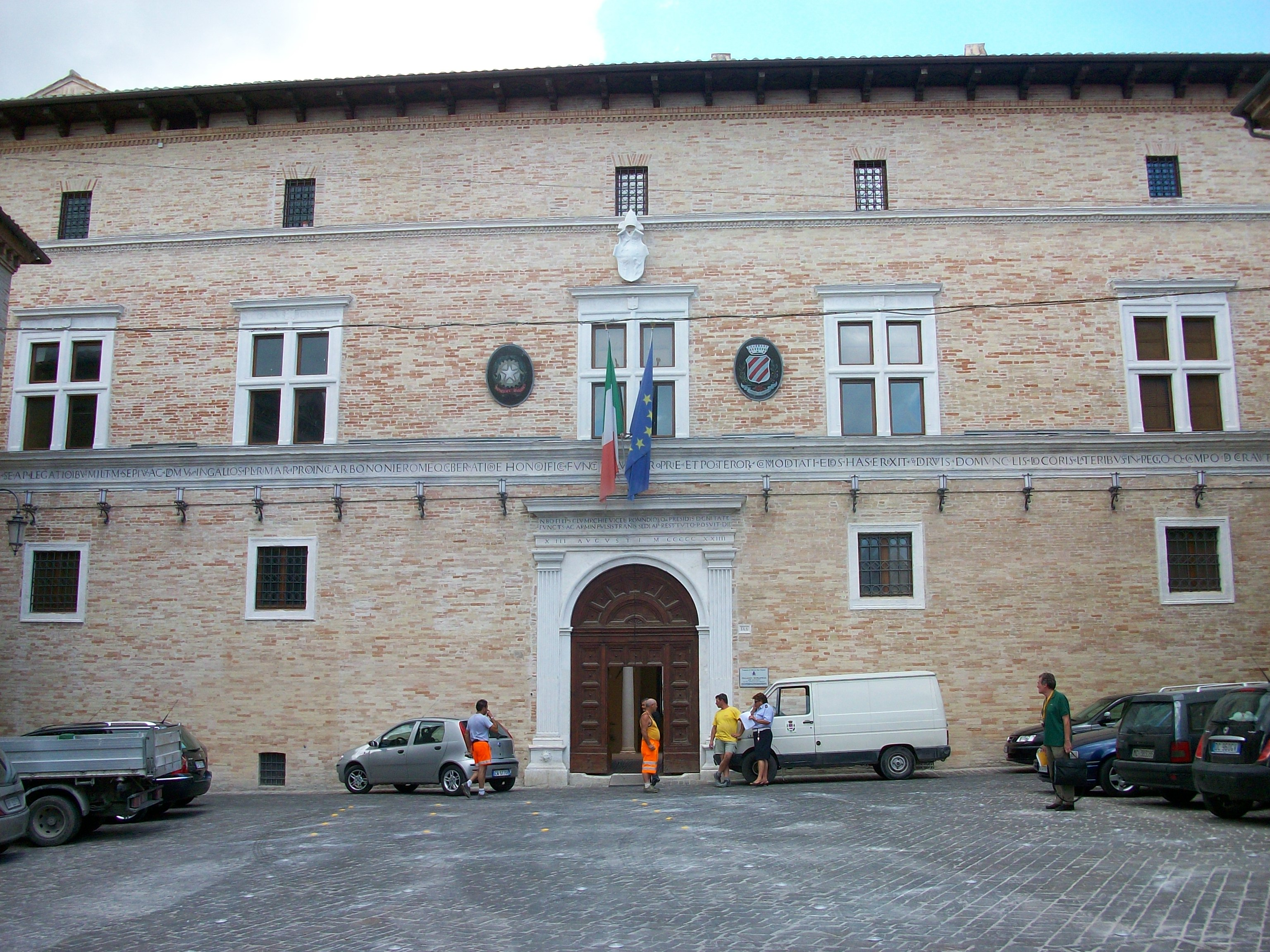
- Palazzo Bonafede

- Location within Italy Location within Marche
- Coordinates: 43°14′N 13°36′E
- Country: Italy
- Region: Marche
- Province: Macerata (MC)
- Frazioni: Villa San Filippo

Government
  - Mayor: Andrea Gentili

Area
  - Total: 20.04 km^{2} (7.74 sq mi)
- Elevation: 236 m (774 ft)

Population (31 August 2017)
  - Total: 7,990
  - Density: 399/km^{2} (1,030/sq mi)
- Demonym: Sangiustesi
- Time zone: UTC+1 (CET)
  - Summer (DST): UTC+2 (CEST)
- Postal code: 62015
- Dialing code: 0733
- Patron saint: Nativity of the Theotokos
- Saint day: September 8
- Website: Official website

Monte San Giusto is a comune (municipality) in the Province of Macerata in the Italian region Marche, located about 45 kilometres (28 mi) south of Ancona and about 14 kilometres (9 mi) southeast of Macerata.

Monte San Giusto borders the following municipalities: Corridonia, Monte San Pietrangeli, Montegranaro, Morrovalle.

Among the churches in Monte San Giusto are:

- Santa Maria della Pietà in Telusiano
- Chiesa Collegiata di Santo Stefano
- Santa Maria delle Panette
