= Scapular of the Seven Sorrows of Mary =

Catholic devotional garment

The Scapular of the Seven Sorrows of Mary (also called Scapular of the Seven Dolours of Mary) is a Catholic devotional scapular that dates back to the thirteenth century. It is worn by members of the Confraternity of the Seven Dolours of Mary, associated with the Servite Order.

== Background ==
In 1255 Pope Alexander IV sanctioned the Servite Order and that order gained a significant number of followers devoted to the Seven Sorrows of Mary. They became the Confraternity of the Seven Dolours of Mary, affiliated with the Servites. Members of this Confraternity later wore a scapular habit which had to be of black cloth, like the habit of the order.

In 1611, the Servite order's confraternity and the Black Scapular of the Seven Dolours of Mary received indulgences from Pope Paul V.

Nothing is prescribed concerning this scapular, but usually the front has an image of Our Lady of Sorrows. This scapular must be worn constantly, if one wishes to gain the indulgences of the confraternity approved by the Congregation for Indulgences in 1888. Priests may obtain from the General of the Servites the faculty to receive the faithful into the confraternity and to bless and invest with the scapular.

== The Confraternity ==
This scapular is the symbol of the Confraternity of Our Lady of Sorrows, a body of the Catholic faithful associated with the Servite Order. The purpose of this association is to foster devotion to the Passion of Jesus Christ and the Sorrows of Mary his mother. In the case of most devotional scapulars there are some prescriptions regarding ornamentation or design. In the case of the Black Scapular, there are no such prescriptions, aside that it be of black woollen cloth.

=== History ===
The confraternity began to develop around in the 13th Century, soon after the founding of the Servite order in 1223. Groups of laypeople wishing to share in the life and spirit of the monks moved into areas surrounding the Servite monasteries. In 1374, the prior general of the order declared the members of these groups to be members of "their association" and permitted them to take part in the spiritual merit of the order. Little changed in the association until the ascension of Pope Paul V who, in 1607, promulgated new regulations regarding the ordering of confraternities which were extant at the time. It was at this point that the familiar small cloth devotional scapulars began to become the symbol of confraternities associated with Religious orders. The Confraternity, as it stands today, was officially designated by Pope Innocent X in 1645.

=== Enrollment, Obligations and Benefits ===
Any baptised person of any age or gender, who is willing to undertake the obligations stipulated by the order may be enrolled. These obligations are to wear the Black Scapular, to pray 15 minutes daily for the whole of the Servite order and the church (the Chaplet of Seven Sorrows is recommended) including at least one "Hail Mary", one "Hail Holy Queen", and if possible perform some work of mercy towards those suffering either bodily, spiritually, or mentally. The benefits of membership are in participation in the life of the Servite order as well as a share in all of their works and prayers and an opportunity to deepen one's understanding of the life of Christ and His mother. There are other more, ethereal benefits, based on private revelations from various mystics.

== See also ==
- Scapular
