= Pietro Augustoni =

Italian architect

Pietro Augustoni (2 September 1741 – 12 October 1815) was an Italian architect of the Rococo and Neoclassical period, mainly active in the Marche region of Italy, including Fermo, a region under the governance of the Papal States.

== Biography ==
Augustoni was born in Como in Northern Italy. He would design a number of churches, including:

- Collegiata dei Filippini, Fermo
- Collegiata Santo Stefano, Monte San Giusto
- San Filippo Neri, Treia
- San Filippo Neri, Recanati
