= Recanati =

- Comune
- Città di Recanati
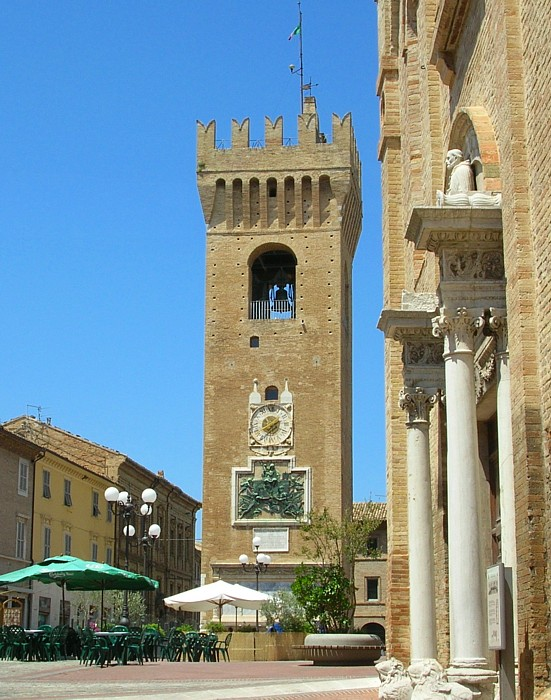
- Civic Tower

- Flag Coat of arms

- Location within Italy Location within Marche
- Coordinates: 43°24′13″N 13°32′59″E
- Country: Italy
- Region: Marche
- Province: Macerata (MC)
- Frazioni: Bagnolo, Castelnuovo, Chiarino, Le Grazie, Montefiore, Santa Lucia

Government
  - Mayor: Antonio Bravi (Democratic Party)

Area
  - Total: 103.46 km^{2} (39.95 sq mi)
- Elevation: 296 m (971 ft)

Population (31 July 2016)
  - Total: 21,229
  - Density: 205.19/km^{2} (531.44/sq mi)
- Demonym: Recanatesi
- Time zone: UTC+1 (CET)
  - Summer (DST): UTC+2 (CEST)
- Postal code: 62019
- Dialing code: 071
- Patron saint: St. Vitus
- Saint day: 15 June
- Website: Official website

Recanati (Italian pronunciation: [rekaˈnaːti]) is a comune (municipality) in the province of Macerata, in the Italian region of Marche. Recanati was founded around 1150 AD from three pre-existing castles. In 1290 it proclaimed itself an independent republic and, in the 15th century, was famous for its international fair. In March 1798 it was conquered by Napoleon.

The elongated historic center extends from one end to the other for over 200 metres and occupies an area of about 35 hectares. Its linear structure distinguishes it from most of the neighboring centers with a concentric plan, in which the inhabited area has extended from a central square. Along the margins of the central road, connecting the ancient housing clusters, there are numerous aristocratic buildings, for the most part on three floors, built by merchants or landowners.

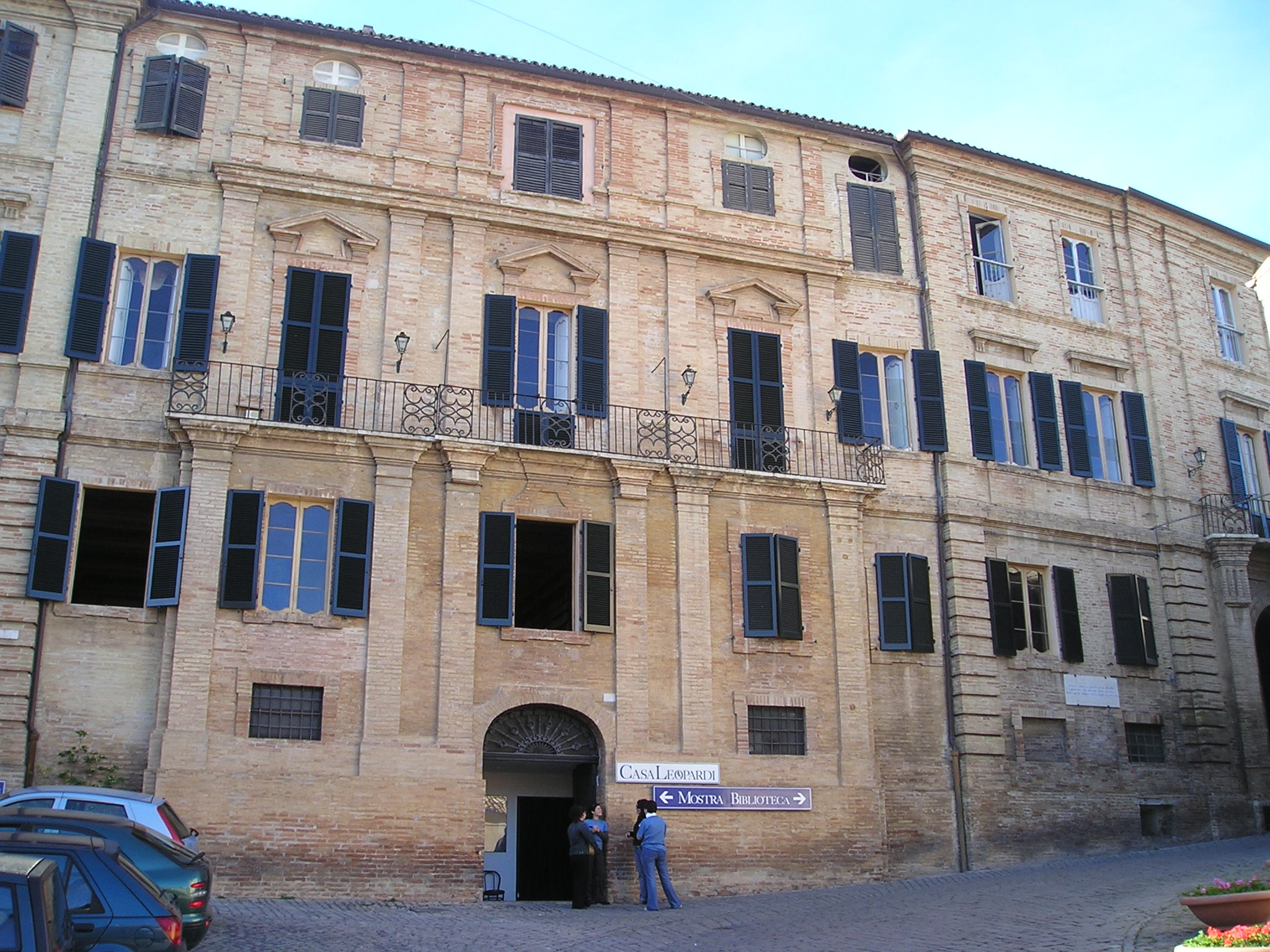
Leopardi's palace

It is the hometown of the tenor Beniamino Gigli and the poet Giacomo Leopardi, which is why the town is known to some as "the city of poetry". Famous medieval Ashkenazi Kabbalist Rabbi Menahem Recanati flourished here in the 13th century. Teatro Persiani named after Giuseppe Persiani an opera composer, born in 1799, is located in the town.

== History ==
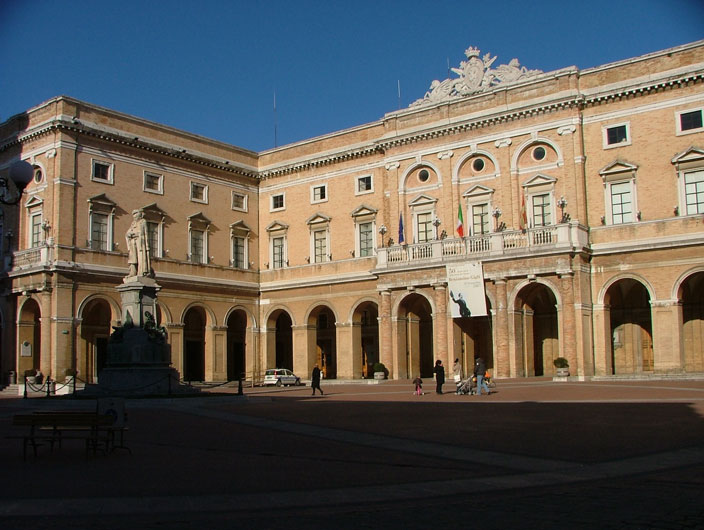
Town Hall

The origin of Recanati is unclear, although the area was inhabited since prehistoric times by the Piceni. In Roman times, the river Potenza, which was navigable then, saw the rise of two cities: Potentia, which developed at the river's mouth, and Helvia Recina, located more inland. When the Goths led by Radagaisus ravaged the region around 406 AD, their inhabitants took refuge on the hills, perhaps founding the modern Recanati, which would take its name from Ricina.

The first document in which Recanati is mentioned dates back to a papal seal wrote in 1139: here it is cited the Santa Maria de Recanato church.

In the 12th century, during the controversies between Frederick Barbarossa and the Pope, Recanati expelled the feudal counts which ruled its area, and gave itself a communal constitution under the lead of consuls (consoli). In 1203 they were replaced by podestà. In 1228, Recanati sided with Barbarossa's nephew, Frederick II, who again was in conflict with the pope; for this reason, the town acquired the control of the nearby Adriatic shore, and the right to found a port (the modern Porto Recanati). In 1239, however, Recanati began to support the pope, and the following year Gregory IX gave it the title of City and bishopric seat that had been previously held by the nearby Osimo.

In this period, the development of trade and the demographic development lead to a progressive urban expansion: all the depopulated areas became populated and the original castles merged, so that Recanati become an actual united village.

In the early 14th century, the strife between Guelphs and Ghibellines, which plagued much of Italy, also affected Recanati. In a series of incidents, citizens of Recanati, among the others, ravaged and plundered the cathedral, and later killed some Guelph (pro-papal) exponents. In response, in 1322, papal mercenaries besieged Recanati, and destroyed its fortifications, the main Ghibelline palaces, and the Priors' Palaces. By 1328, the Pope had pardoned the city; however, her seat as a bishopric was restored only in 1354. In 1415 Recanati hosted former Pope Gregory XII, who died here two years later.

At the time, the town was home to a popular trading fair, which was further boosted by Pope Martin V in 1422.

Around the middle of the 15th century, the Jewish ghetto, previously located near the cathedral, was transferred, considering that it could interfere with the main Christian worship, along one of the alleys of Montevolpino.

During several centuries of economic prosperity, Recanati became home to prominent jurists, writers, and artists such as Lorenzo Lotto and Guercino.

Recanati was occupied by Napoleonic troops in 1798. In 1831 it took part to the Risorgimento riots, and was annexed to the newly formed Kingdom of Italy in 1860 after the dissolution of most of the Papal States.

== Main sights ==
=== Religious buildings ===
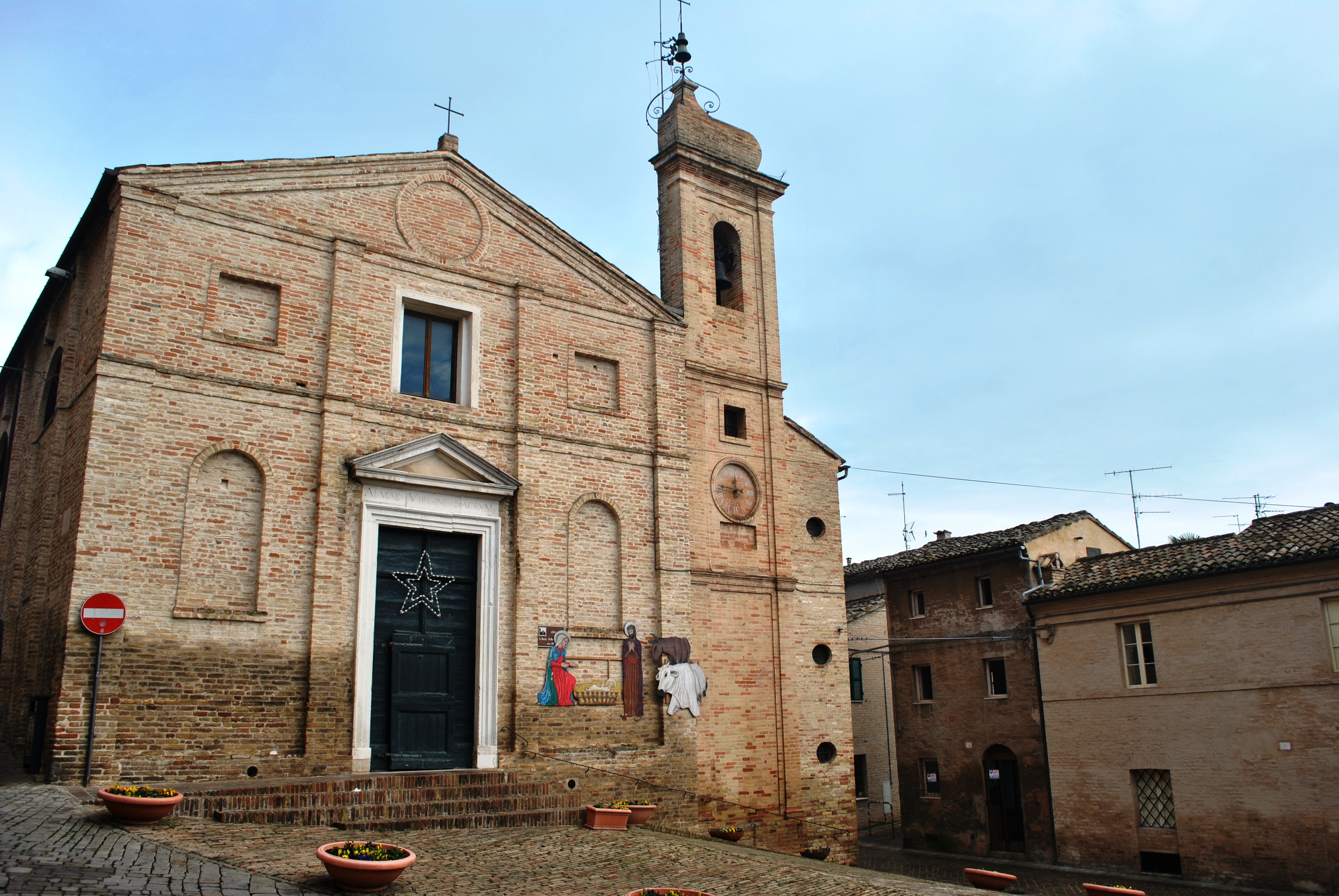
Santa Maria di Montemorello

- Santa Maria di Castelnuovo: 12th-century church with portal with a Byzantine style lunette, signed and dated 1253, depicting the Madonna enthroned with Sts Michael and Gabriel. The interior has a fresco by Pietro di Domenico of Montepulciano.
- Sant'Agostino: 13th-century church and cloister, remade one century later together with the cathedral. Istrian stone portal by Giuliano da Maiano. In the 18th century, the interior was remade redecorated according to a design by Ferdinando Galli da Bibbiena, with canvases by Pomarancio, Pier Simone Fanelli, and Felice Damiani.
- San Vito: church built over a pre-existing Romanesque-Byzantine edifice. It was given the current appearance in the mid-17th century, only the apse and the bell tower remaining of the former structure. The façade was remade after an earthquake in 1741 according to a design by Luigi Vanvitelli. Artworks in the interior include canvases by Pomarancio, Fanelli, Felice da Gubbio (1582), Giuseppe Valeriano (1550) and Paolo de Matteis (1727).
- Co-Cathedral of St. Flavian: 14th-century church with the annexed bishop's palace and the diocesan museum. Pope Gregory XII is buried here.
- San Domenico: 15th-century church with a 1481 portal by Giuliano da Maiano. It houses a fresco of the Glory of St. Vincent Ferrer by Lorenzo Lotto.
- San Pietrino: 14th-century church with an 18th-century façade attributed to Vanvitelli.
- Madonna delle Grazie: 1465 church.
- San Filippo Neri: church
- Santa Maria in Monte Morello
- San Michele

=== Secular buildings ===
- Palazzo Venieri: designed by Giuliano da Maiano.
- Palazzo Mazzagalli: designed by Giuliano da Maiano or Luciano Laurana.
- Montefiore Castle: dates to the Late Middle Ages. It has a polygonal plan with a high tower with merlons.
- Neolithic necropolises of Fontenoce and Cava Kock (4th millennium BC).
- Civic Museum of Villa Colloredo Mels: town museum of art and archeology, among the paintings it houses among other paintings, Lotto's Recanati Polyptych.
- Carabinieri barracks (14th century)

== Economy ==
The city has a long tradition of producing musical instruments, such as accordions by Castagnari and guitars and others by Eko Guitars.

== Religion ==
Recanati is characterized by a religious vitality, as the abundance of churches and religious complexes testify: it is a consequence of its filiation with the State Church, its close link to the shrine of Loreto and its role of bishopric.

The Diocese of Recanati was a Roman Catholic diocese in Italy. It was founded in 1240 by Pope Gregory IX, who allowed Recanati to pass from "castrum" to "civitas".

Its principal church, S. Flaviano, was raised to the dignity of a cathedral on 21 December 1239, and separated from the jurisdiction of the Diocese of Osimo. The diocese of Osimo was then suppressed, as it chose to support the Emperor Frederick II against the pope. On 22 May 1240, the Castello di Recanati was raised to the dignity of a city by Gregory IX.

During its early history it often lost and regained its episcopal status due to the policy adopted by the pope. On 27 July 1263 the diocese was completely suppressed by Pope Urban IV in the bull Cives Recanatensis due to its support of Manfred, who claimed the Kingdom of Sicily.

== People ==
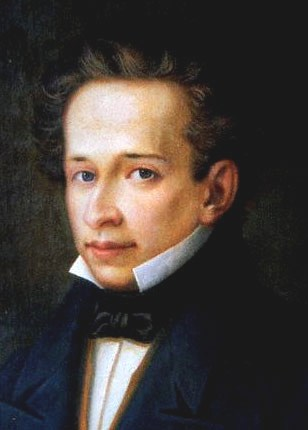
Giacomo Leopardi

- Giacomo Leopardi (1798–1837), poet, essayist, philosopher and philologist, pioneer of the Romanticism movement
- Beniamino Gigli (1890–1957), tenor
- Giuseppe Persiani (1799–1869), opera composer
- Recanati was also the place of origin of the Italian paternal ancestors of famed Argentine footballer Lionel Messi.
- Menahem Recanati (1223–1290), Kabbalist and Rabbi
- Franco Uncini, Italian former professional motorcycle road racer
