= Pier Simone Fanelli =

Italian painter (1641–1703)

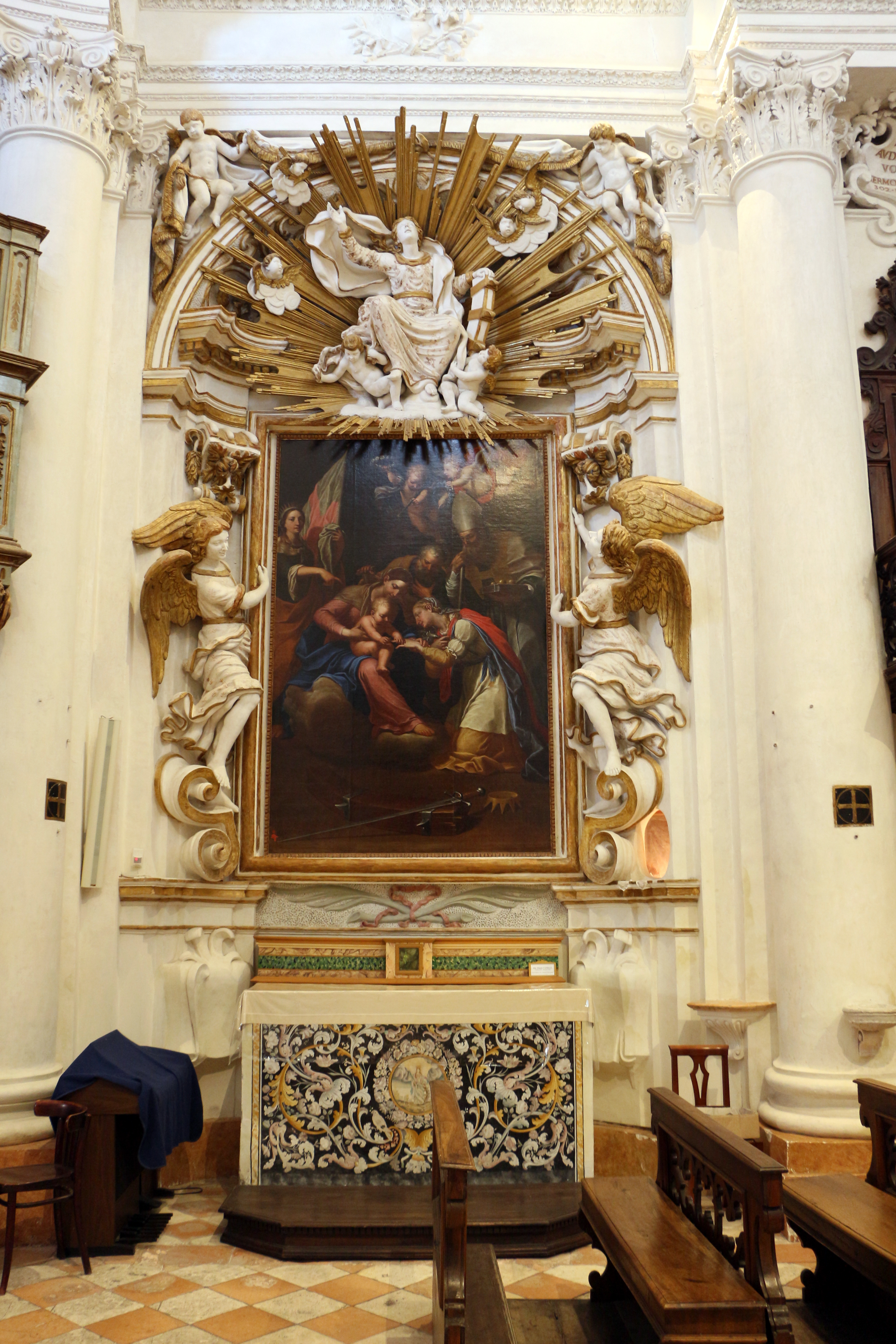
Altarpiece in Cingoli, Marche

Pier Simone Fanelli (29 December 1641 - 1703) was an Italian painter active in the region of Marche, active in a Baroque style.

== Biography ==
He was born in Ancona and died in Cingoli. His training is unclear. By 1665-1666 he was painting in the church of the Filippini in Recanati. By 1680, he was employed by the Cappuccini in Macerata. In Macerata he worked with Giovanni Domenico Ferracuti, a landscape painter. He also worked with Paolo Marini, to decorate the church of San Filippo Neri in Cingoli.
