= Fivefold Scapular =

Catholic sacramental that combines five scapulars

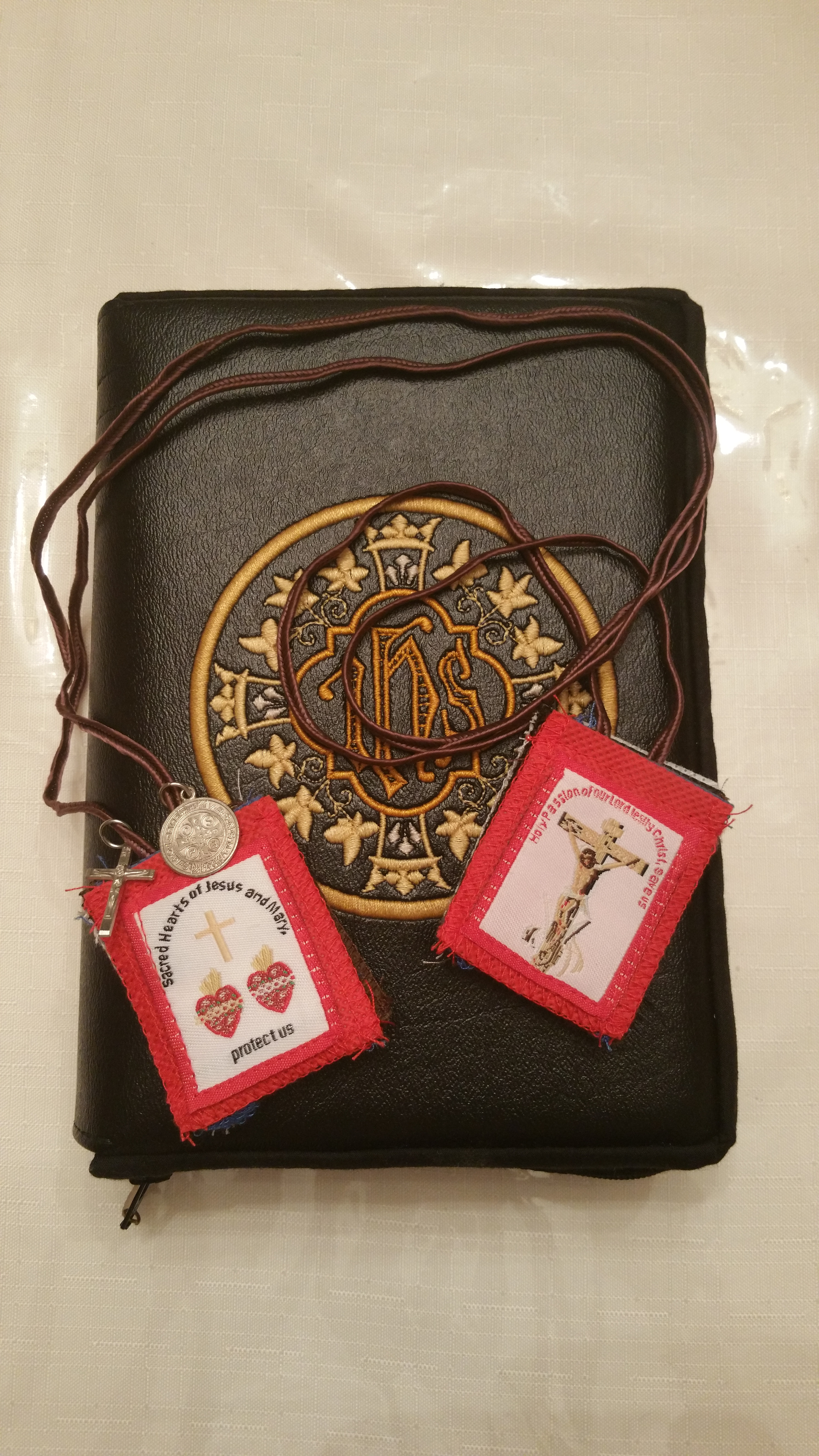
A Fivefold Scapular sits atop a copy of the Holy Bible.

The Fivefold Scapular, also known as Redemptorist Scapular, is a sacramental made up of five best-known of the early scapulars in the Catholic Church: the Brown Scapular of the Carmelites, the Blue Scapular of the Immaculate Conception, the Black Scapular of the Servites, the Red Scapular of the Passion, and the White Scapular of the Most Holy Trinity. There are 17 total officially approved scapulars of the Catholic Church.

== History ==
The Fivefold Scapular originally was a four-fold scapular (Brown, Black, Blue, and white), and is known as Redemptorist Scapular, since the Redemptorist Fathers were first granted special faculties, in perpetuity, by the Holy See to bless and invest the scapulars in 1803 and to enroll the faithful into the respective confraternities. In 1847, the Red Passionist Scapular was added to the other four to become the current form of Fivefold Scapular, and in 1886 Pope Leo XIII gave permission to bless and enroll the five scapulars cumulatively, and later the Church extended the faculty (to bless and enroll the Fivefold Scapular) to any priest.

== The Brown Scapular ==
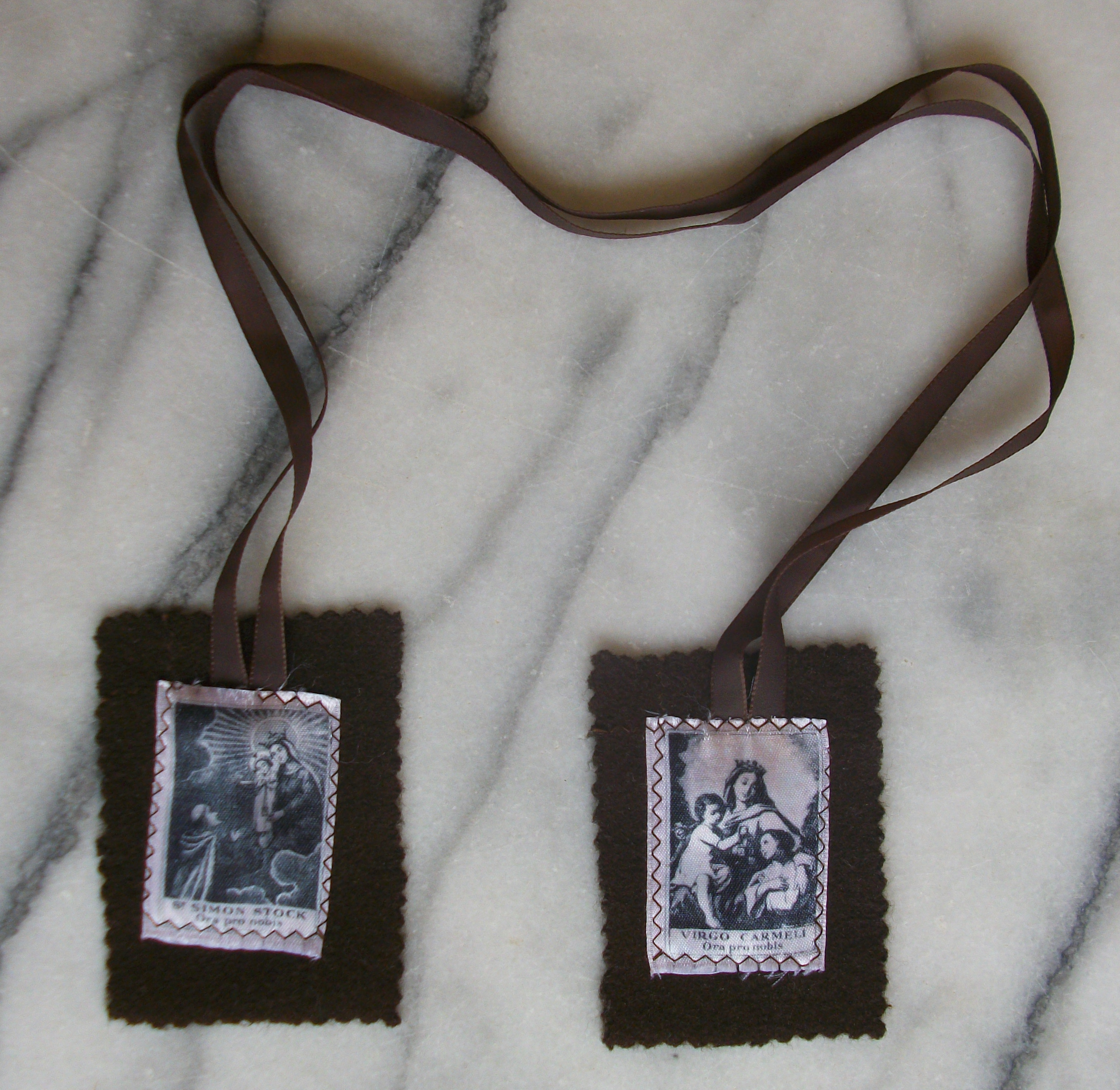
The Scapular of Our Lady of Mount Carmel (Brown Scapular).

The Brown Scapular (also known as the Scapular of Our Lady of Mount Carmel, or simply as the Scapular) is the most popular scapular. It was given to Simon Stock by Our Lady of Mount Carmel, who promised him that "whoever dies clothed in this scapular shall not suffer the eternal flames." Later, she appeared to Pope John XXII as the Mediatrix of all graces, promising him that "whoever shall wear my Scapular faithfully, pray the Divine Office [various indults have applied in the past and apply today], and exercise chastity in their state of life shall not suffer Hell, and if they should go to Purgatory, I shall bring them to Heaven on the First Saturday after their death" (Sabbatine Privilege).

The Brown Scapular has been praised by numerous popes. Venerable Pope Pius XII said that the Brown Scapular is "a sign of consecration to the Immaculate Heart of Mary" and that "the scapular is not superstitious... One is not saved from Hell merely by wearing it. No, for it is a sign that they must live their lives in total obedience to God and trust in him, through and with the Immaculate Heart of Mary." In 1917, the Virgin Mary appeared in Fátima, Portugal, as Our Lady of the Rosary, holding not only the Holy Rosary but also the Brown Scapular. Moreover, in her final apparition, during the Miracle of the Sun, one of the three seers, after known as Sister Lúcia, saw Our Lady of Mount Carmel. Furthermore, it was to Saint Dominic that the Virgin Mary appeared with the Rosary and the Brown Scapular, her arms outstretched (a gesture of prayer), saying, "One day by the Rosary and the Scapular I will save the world". Finally, the members of the Blue Army of Our Lady of Fátima wear the Brown Scapular as a sign of personal consecration to Our Lady of Fátima.

== The Blue Scapular ==
The Blue Scapular (also known as the Scapular of the Immaculate Conception) is due to Venerable Ursula Benincasa, founder of the Order of Theatine Nuns, when a group of wealthy young women who had given up their wealth in order to live for Jesus Christ had wanted to honor the Immaculate Conception of the Blessed Virgin Mary. The Virgin Mary had promised Benincasa that whoever wore her Scapular would be under her special protection and receive special graces through her maternal intercession. The Blue Scapular was highly praised by Pope Clement X.

== The Black Scapular ==
The Black Scapular (also known as the Scapular of the Seven Sorrows of Mary) was revealed to Pope Alexander IV shortly after he had sanctified the Servite Order in 1255. Our Lady of Sorrows had promised that whoever meditated upon her seven dolors would receive her special protection at the hour of death.

== The Red Scapular ==
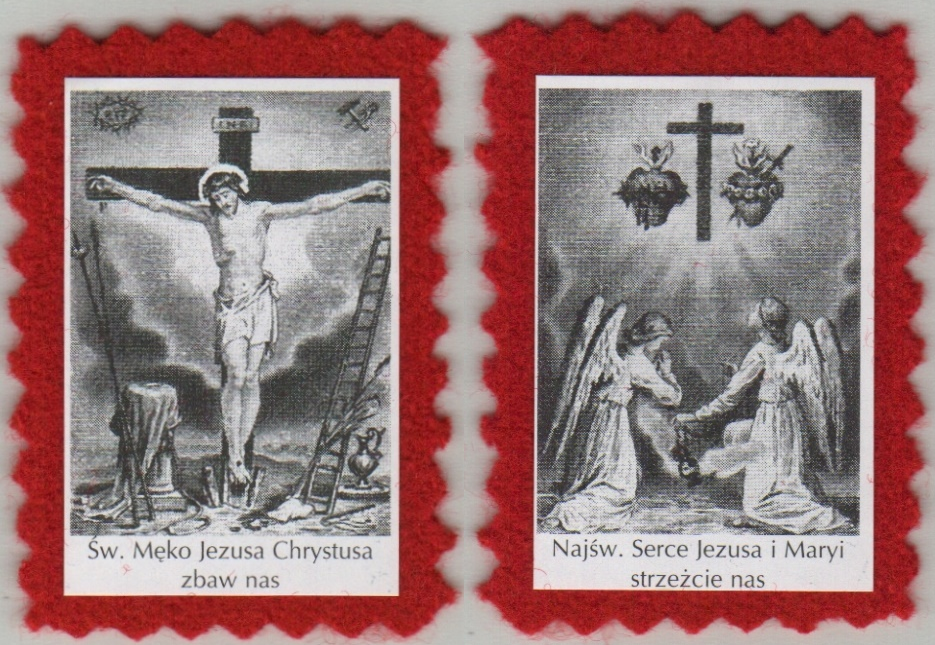
The Scapular of the Passion.

The Red Scapular (also known as the Scapular of the Passion of Our Lord and the Sacred Hearts and Jesus and Mary) was revealed to Sister Apolline Andriveau, a Daughter of Charity of Saint Vincent de Paul, in 1846. The Lord promised that whoever wore his Scapular would be granted a great increase of faith, hope, and charity every Friday (the office day of the Passion). The apparition was repeated several times, and in the following year Pope Pius IX sanctified the sacramental on June 25, 1857.

== The White Scapular ==
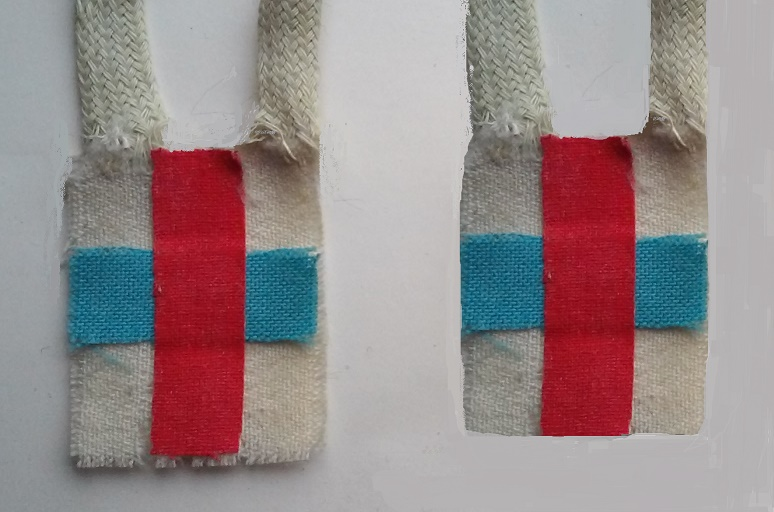
The Scapular of the Most Holy Trinity (White Scapular).

The White Scapular (also known as the Scapular of the Most Holy Trinity) is the usual habit of the Secular Third Order of the Most Holy Trinity and is worn also by members of the Confraternity of the same Order (the Trinitarians). Saint John de Matha during his first Mass (around 1193) had a vision of Christ between two captives (http://www.trinitari.org). The Christian captive had a staff with a red and blue cross on the top in the Greek form (+). From this vision he founded the Order of the Holy Trinity and Captives (the Trinitarian Order) whose charism was to liberate Christians taken into captivity by the Moors and to glorify the Holy Trinity. (Today it is still seeking the glory of the Holy Trinity and the liberation of captives).

== See also ==
- Green Scapular
- Miraculous Medal
- Rosary and scapular
- Saint Benedict Medal
