= Blue Scapular of the Immaculate Conception =

Catholic devotional garment

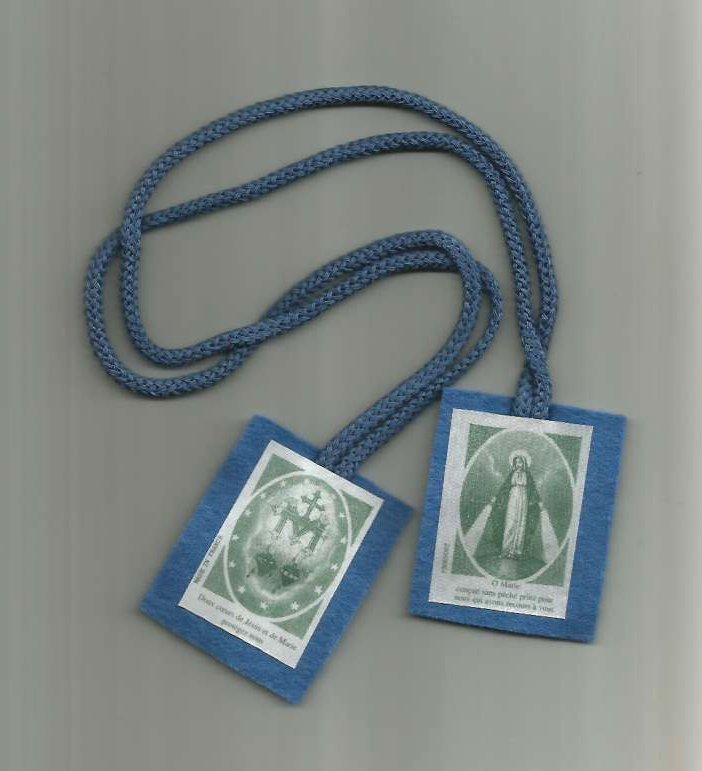
The Blue Scapular.

The Blue Scapular of the Immaculate Conception (most known as simply Blue Scapular) is a devotional scapular that traces its roots to Venerable Ursula Benincasa, who founded the Catholic religious order of the Theatine Nuns. This scapular must have a blue woollen cloth and on one side bears a symbolization of the mystery of the Immaculate Conception of Our Lady and on the other the name of the Blessed Virgin Mary.

== History ==
=== Ursula Benincasa ===
Consecrated by her parents to Virgin Mary's Immaculate Conception, Ursula Benincasa (1547-1618), spent part of her youth and adult life as a hermit in the region of Saint Elmo (Naples). In 1583, she founded the Congregation of the Oblates of the Immaculate Conception of the Most Blessed Virgin Mary. She also founded the Hermitage of the Contemplative Nuns of the Immaculate Conception. The rule of both communities was approved by Pope Gregory XV on April 7, 1623. On August 7, 1793, Pope Pius VI recognized the heroic virtues of Ursula, and proclaimed her "Venerable".

=== Blue Scapular ===
In 1617, Benincasa experienced a vision in Naples in which Jesus promised great favors for her religious order. She then begged Jesus for the same graces to such people who, living in the world, would have a special devotion to the Immaculate Conception, observe chastity according to their station in life, and wear a small blue scapular. She stated that Jesus granted her petition and she began to make small blue scapulars. One part bears the image of the Immaculate Conception, the other has the name of the Virgin Mary. She had them blessed, and started to distribute them. In January 1671, Pope Clement X approved the blessing and investing of this scapular.

=== Confraternity ===
The confraternity of the Immaculate Conception of the Blessed Virgin and Mother of God Mary was erected in 1894 in the Theatine Church of Sant'Andrea della Valle at Rome. (However, according to the official Blue Scapular handbook's reference to historical documents, it was first established on June 26, 1734, at the Congregation's first monastery). It later became an archconfraternity. According to the statutes of the archconfraternity, admission is effected by the blessing and investing with the Blue Scapular, the presentation of the small chaplet of the Immaculate Conception, and the enrolling of the name in the register of the confraternity.

On June 3, 1992, the Marians of the Immaculate Conception obtained a perpetual permission from the Superior General of the Theatine Fathers to bless and confer the blue scapular of Immaculate Conception.

The Blue Scapular is also included in the Fivefold Scapular. The Fivefold Scapular is made of five of the most popular scapulars sewn together on the top and connected to a single shared string.

== See also ==
- Scapular
- Brown Scapular
- Green Scapular
- Red Scapular
- Fivefold Scapular
- Miraculous Medal
