= St. Vincent's Medical Center (Bridgeport) =

Coordinates: 41.202°N 73.2028°W

- Hartford HealthCare

Geography
- Location: Bridgeport, Connecticut, United States

Organization
- Care system: Private
- Type: Teaching
- Affiliated university: Frank H. Netter MD School of Medicine at Quinnipiac University; New York Medical College & Columbia University College of Physicians and Surgeons

Services
- Emergency department: Level II trauma center
- Beds: 473
- Specialty: Tertiary Care Hospital

Helipads
- Helipad: FAA LID: CT12
Number	Length		Surface
Number	ft	m	Surface
H1	40	12	Steel, concrete

History
- Founded: 1903

Links
- Website: http://www.stvincents.org/
- Lists: Hospitals in Connecticut

St. Vincent's Medical Center is a 473-bed tertiary care Catholic hospital in Bridgeport, Connecticut, United States. It serves a large population in Southern Connecticut and offers comprehensive and advanced medical services. The hospital is now managed by Hartford HealthCare, which acquired it from Ascension in 2019.

== Size and services ==
The hospital has a medical staff of 450 physicians and has a total of more than 1,800 employees.

St. Vincent's has an angioplasty program, a bariatric surgery center, and cancer and orthopedic services.

The hospital also has a Family Birthing Center with private rooms for labor, delivery and recovery, a private bathroom and sleeping accommodations for the father, and an entertainment center.

Psychiatric services include an on-site psychiatric unit for acute care and the Hall-Brooke Behavioral Health Services (formerly the independent Hall-Brooke Hospital) an inpatient and outpatient behavioral health facility in Westport, Connecticut.

St. Vincent's is affiliated with Frank H. Netter MD School of Medicine at Quinnipiac University. In 2016 St. Vincent's announced a deal with the Veterans Choice Program to provide health care to veterans.

== St. Vincent's College ==
St. Vincent's Medical Center ran St. Vincent's College, which offered associate degrees in General Studies, Medical Assisting, Nursing, and Radiography. St. Vincent's College also offered a Bachelor of Science degree in Radiologic Sciences and a RN to BSN program. Pharmacy Technician and an RN Refresher.

In 2017, the college was acquired by neighboring Sacred Heart University of Fairfield. It became known as St Vincent's College at Sacred Heart University. In 2024, the college closed and its programs were merged with the college of nursing at Sacred Heart University.

== History ==
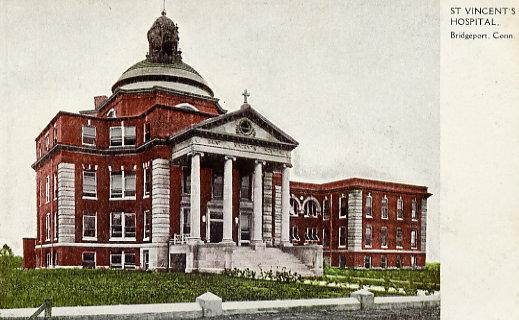
Early postcard picture of the hospital

The hospital was founded by the Daughters of Charity religious order and incorporated on May 19, 1903. Its first building had 75 beds and was built at a cost of $250,000. It opened its doors on June 28, 1905; more than 70 patients were treated by the end of that first day. In the 1930s, Sister Mary Flavia Egan, a Daughter of Charity who is possibly the first student to have received a bachelor of science degree in nursing at Georgetown University in 1925, was the principal of its school.

On Easter Sunday, April 17, 1976, a new hospital building opened just behind the original one. That day, William J. Riordan, then president and chief executive officer of the hospital, directed the transfer of 209 patients to the new structure, a 440,000-square-foot (41,000 m^{2}) building nearly twice the size of the old one.

When the move was made to the new building, the hospital's name was changed from St. Vincent's Hospital to St. Vincent's Medical Center.

== See also ==
- List of hospitals in Connecticut
- Bridgeport Hospital
- Norwalk Hospital
- Yale-New Haven Hospital
- Stamford Hospital
- Greenwich Hospital
- Hartford Hospital
