= Scapular of the Passion =

Scapular of the Passion can refer to

- Red Scapular of the Passion
- Black Scapular of the Passion
