= Mary Flavia Egan =

American religious sister and nurse (1879–1935)

Mary Flavia Egan D.C.
- Born: c. 1879; New York City, US
- Died: August 27, 1935 (aged 56); Washington, D.C., US
- Education: Georgetown University, Nursing Diploma, 1925, Bachelor of Science degree, 1925
- Occupations: Religious sister, nurse
- Organization: Sisters of Charity of Saint Vincent de Paul
- Known for: Presumed to be the first Georgetown graduate to receive a Bachelor of Science in Nursing

Mary Flavia Egan, D.C. (c. 1879 – 1935) was an American Sister of Charity of Saint Vincent de Paul and a nurse leader. She earned a Bachelor of Science degree in 1925, 44 years before Georgetown University officially admitted women in 1969, making her the first graduate of the program as well.

== Background ==
A video by Bill Cessato presents what is known of Sister Mary Flavia's history before and after her time at Georgetown. She served at Providence Hospital in Washington, D.C., then at St. Joseph's Hospital in Philadelphia, and finally, for the last eight years of her life (1927-1935), at St. Vincent's Hospital in Bridgeport, Connecticut, where she was principal of the School of Nursing. Her funeral, presided over by Msgr. John J. McGivney (brother of the Knights of Columbus founder Ven. Michael J. McGivney), was at St. Patrick's Church in Bridgeport, Connecticut, and was mentioned in several Catholic newspapers.
