= Frank H. Netter MD School of Medicine at Quinnipiac University =

Medical school of Quinnipiac University

Coordinates: 41.42014°N 72.89454°W

Frank H. Netter M.D. School of Medicine at Quinnipiac University
- Motto: Qui Transtulit Sustinet "He who transplants, sustains"
- Type: Private
- Established: 2010
- Dean: Dr. Lisa Coplit
- Faculty: 20 full-time
- Students: MD – 380
- Location: North Haven, Connecticut, U.S.
- Campus: Suburban
- Nickname: Bobcats
- Mascot: Boomer the Bobcat
- Website: www.qu.edu/schools/medicine/

The Frank H. Netter M.D. School of Medicine at Quinnipiac University, also known colloquially as Quinnipiac Medical School, or simply "Netter," is a medical school located in North Haven, Connecticut. The medical school was established in 2010 with its first class starting in 2013. It awards the Doctor of Medicine (MD) degree.

== Establishment ==
The Frank H. Netter M.D. School of Medicine was established in 2010 with a $100 million investment from the family of Frank H. Netter, the renowned surgeon and medical illustrator. It received preliminary accreditation from the Association of American Medical Colleges (AAMC), preliminary accreditation from the Liaison Committee on Medical Education (LCME), and full accreditation from the Connecticut State Board of Education in 2012. It welcomed its first class in 2013. The School of Medicine received full accreditation from the LCME in February 2017.

Netter is one of about a dozen new medical schools established in anticipation of increased demand for medical professionals following the passage of the Patient Protection and Affordable Care Act and the aging of the baby boomer generation. Upon opening, it had a strong message that highlighted its desire for graduates to pursue primary care. However, over the years, as students started to match into competitive residencies such as orthopedics, plastic surgery, ophthalmology, dermatology, general surgery, etc. at some of the top programs in the country, students are now encouraged to go into any field of medicine that they think will best suit them. In its most recent years, Quinnipiac received accreditation to launch several home residency programs based out of St. Vincent's Medical Center (Bridgeport). For the Class of 2030, there were over 11,700 applicants for 95 spots. For matriculants, the mean MCAT score was 512, the mean total GPA was 3.8, and the mean age was 25. The estimated annual budget for a student is $73,141, which is comparable to other medical schools.

== Curriculum ==
During the first two years, the majority of students' time is spent engaging in various learning modalities in the organ systems-based Foundation of Medicine (FOM) course. FOM includes a mix of traditional lectures and small group, team-based activities. Additionally, pre-clinical students spend one morning per week in the Clinical Arts and Sciences (CAS) portion of the curriculum in which they learn and practice clinical skills, often with the help of standardized patients.

Students participate in the longitudinal Medical Student Home (MeSH) program starting in their first semester, working one half-day each week in the offices of primary care doctors throughout their first three years of medical school. Students spend their third and fourth years rotating through internships in various departments at St. Vincent's Medical Center (Bridgeport), Saint Francis Hospital & Medical Center, Connecticut Children's Medical Center, and other affiliated hospitals (such as MidState Medical Center and Middlesex Hospital Connecticut). Quinnipiac completed its own 145,000 square foot medical facility on March 1, 2013. The Medical School facility is located adjacent to the facilities for the Schools of Health Sciences and Nursing, and students of all three schools are expected to interact frequently with each other through classes and the Center for Interprofessional Healthcare Education.

Throughout the entire medical school experience, each student pursues a capstone project in one of the following fields:

1. Global, public, and community health
2. Health policy and advocacy
3. Health management and leadership
4. Health communication
5. Medical education
6. Translational, clinical, and basic science research
7. Medical humanities
8. Interdisciplinary Medicine
9. Self-designed
