= Therese-Madeleine Fantou =

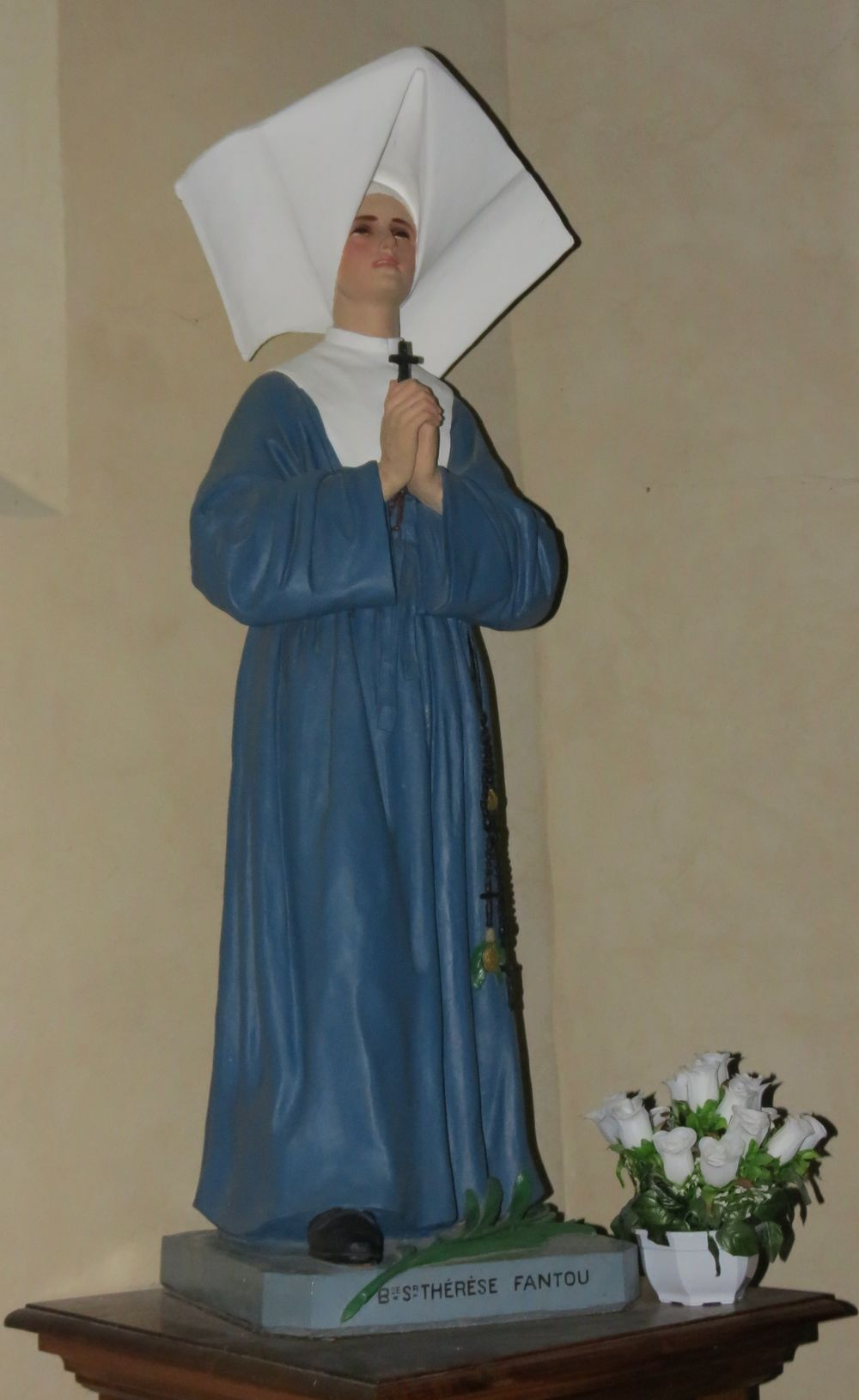

Religious
- Born: 29 July 1747; Miniac-Morvan, Kingdom of France
- Died: 26 June 1794; Cambrai, French First Republic
- Venerated in: Roman Catholic Church
- Beatified: 13 June 1920 by Pope Benedict XV
- Feast: 26 June

Therese-Madeleine Fantou was a religious with the Daughters of Charity of Saint Vincent de Paul martyred during the French Revolution. She is recognized as a Blessed martyr by the Catholic Church.

Coming from a very modest family, she received from her mother a rigorous Catholic education.

At the age of 24, on November 28, 1771, she joined the Daughters of Charity of Saint Vincent de Paul de Plouer and entered the mother house in Paris.

In 1790, the Constituent Assembly proclaimed the Civil Constitution of the Clergy. It unilaterally reorganized the secular clergy of France, instituted a new Church (the Constitutional Church), which caused the division of the clergy into constitutional clergy and refractory clergy. The year 1793 would be the last year for the congregation of the Sisters of Arras. Indeed, the arrival of citizen Joseph Le Bon elected to the Committee of General Safety offered only one solution to religious orders, that of taking an oath to the Constitution to save their lives.

The sisters of Arras would not escape judgment. Arrested and transferred from prison to prison, Thérèse Fantou and the nuns of the congregation refused to accept the constitution. On June 26, 1794, they were beheaded.

With her companions Madeleine Fontaine, Françoise Lanel and Jeanne Gérard, she was beatified by Pope Benedict XV on June 13, 1920. The four Blessed are honored on June 26.
