= Green Scapular =

Catholic sacramental

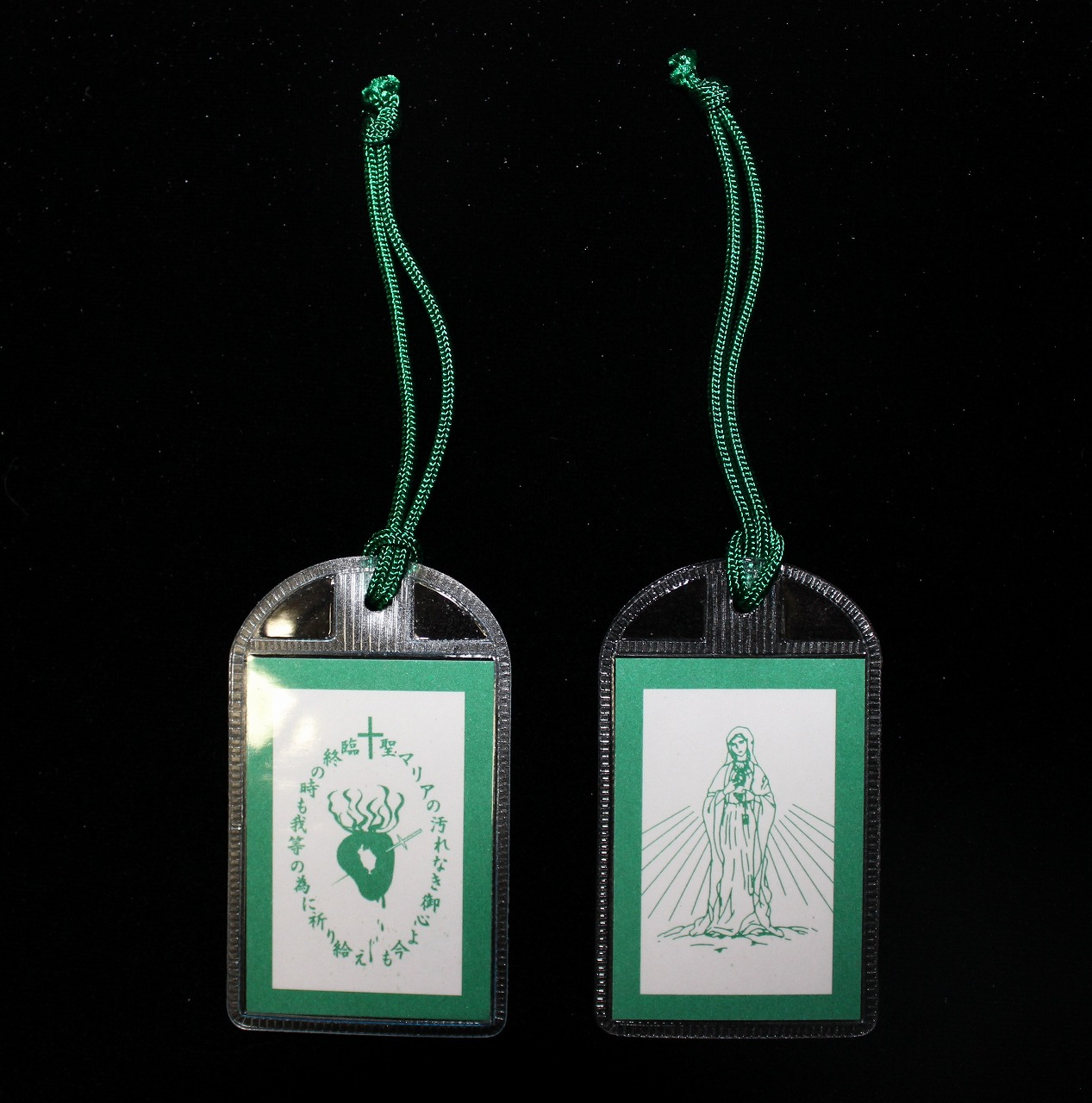
The Green Scapular

The Green Scapular (also called The Badge of the Immaculate Heart of Mary) is a Catholic sacramental that invokes the Blessed Virgin Mary by way of her Immaculate Heart. Approved by Pope Pius IX in 1870, it is historically among the most popular scapulars ever sanctioned in the Church and arose from the very same Vincentian congregation of religious as the slightly-older Miraculous Medal and the slightly-younger Red Scapular. The Green Scapular is worn to gain Mary's intercession in various aspects of one's own life or, alternatively, that of an associate as well as at the hour of death. A hallmark of this sacramental against others from Catholicism is its flexibility; it can be kept by Catholics and non-Catholics alike, the keeper need not maintain any prayer or obligation, and the favor(s) it earns will apply to the one who wears it, carries it, or simply keeps it aside without exception. It can be carried or kept by one party in the stead of another if circumstances impede the intended recipient to safely or practically accept it.

It has been called a scapular due primarily to its material construction and its resemblance to other Catholic scapulars, but it is not descended from any scapular that constitutes an essential part of any order's habit. Having one two-sided cloth pendant instead of two one-sided cloth pendants (as is typical for Catholic scapulars), it is more appropriately styled as a badge than as a proper scapular.

The development of the Green Scapular is attributed to visions that Sister Justine Bisqueyburu, a Daughter of Charity, experienced in Paris beginning in 1840.

== Background ==
Almost ten years after Saint Catherine Labouré, a member of the same Congregation of the Daughters of Charity, reported several apparitions of the Blessed Virgin Mary, in 1830, at the motherhouse in the Rue du Bac, Paris, that resulted on the creation of the Miraculous Medal of Our Lady of Graces. According to Chris Maunder, the visions of the Rue du Bac inspired other similar accounts among the French Vincentian nuns during the 1840s.

A second Daughter of Charity of St Vincent de Paul, Sister Justine Bisqueyburu, reported a similar experience in 1840, that led to the creation of the Green Scapular. In 1846 Sister Apolline Andriveau purportedly received a vision at Troyes, France, that formed the basis of the Red Scapular of the Passion.

== Description ==
The Green Scapular consists of a single rectangular piece of green cloth suspended from a green cord. Unlike traditional devotional scapulars, which ordinarily consist of two pieces of cloth, it has only one cloth badge, with a devotional image on each side. Marie Edouard Mott described its original form as resembling “more like a medallion of cloth” than a scapular in the ordinary sense.

One side depicts the Virgin Mary as Justine Bisqueyburu reported seeing her in her apparitions: dressed in a long white gown and light-blue mantle, with uncovered hair falling loosely about her shoulders and holding her Immaculate Heart. The other side depicts the Immaculate Heart of Mary, radiant and pierced by a sword. The heart is surrounded by an oval inscription, surmounted by a cross, reading: “Immaculate Heart of Mary, pray for us, now and at the hour of our death.”

Mott noted that the designation “scapular” was technically imprecise because the object was not derived from the habit of a religious order or associated with a confraternity. He stated that “Badge of the Immaculate Heart of Mary” had been considered a more exact name, but that Green Scapular had already become established in common usage.

Four examples of the Green Scapular, showing variations in design and construction; each is shown front and back.

== Devotional use ==
Green scapulars can be worn about the neck, provided one has a cord or ribbon of sufficient length, but simply keeping it on one's person or storing it in one's own space is understood to be just as effective. They can be placed under the pillow, kept in a wallet, or stitched into one's clothing. Covert placement of the scapular—by a member of the faithful—into the proximity of the intended recipient of its associated graces continues to be recognized as legitimate and this practice has seen infrequent waves of popularity.

According to Marie Edouard Mott, C.M., the Green Scapular does not require the formal investiture associated with some other devotional scapulars because it is not derived from the habit of any order or religious society. Mott also states that no specific formula is mandated for its blessing, however the blessing rite itself should be properly reserved for a priest. The scapular may be worn by the person for whom it is intended, placed in the person's clothing, or kept in the person's bed or room.

A popular devotional practice associated with the scapular encourages daily recitation of the prayer inscribed around the image of the Immaculate Heart of Mary: “Immaculate Heart of Mary, pray for us now and at the hour of our death.” Mott suggests that—especially if a recipient is unwilling or unable to say the prayer—it can be said by the person who gave it on behalf of a recipient.

Mott attributes these practices to instructions that Sr. Justine reported receiving during an apparition of the Blessed Virgin Mary on September 8, 1846. According to his account, Sr. Justine had been directed by her spiritual director, Jean-Marie Aladel, C.M., to seek clarification about whether the scapular required a particular blessing or ceremony, imposed particular prayers or other obligations, or was intended only for use by missionaries. Ultimately, the devotion was not described as geographically restricted and, in Mott's account, could be practiced both within France and abroad.

Above all else, however, Mott states that it is the confidence with which the scapular is given that is the chief determinant of the degree of any graces obtained, and the Society of the Green Scapular furthermore corroborates this understanding in its own literature. Mott relates that this understanding is supported directly by the apparition narrative wherein rays of differing lengths issue from Mary's hands.

In 1870 Mott reports Father Borgogno, procurator general of the Congregation of the Mission at the Holy See, as having presented a Green Scapular to Pope Pius IX and requested permission for the Daughters of Charity of Saint Vincent de Paul to promote and distribute it. According to Borgogno's account as reproduced by Mott, Pius IX granted the requested permission.

Graces attributed to an invocation of this holy image are broad and diverse. They range from physical health and peace of mind to wholesale spiritual conversions (particularly those of lapsed Catholics).

== Shrines ==
There is a diocesan shrine of Our Lady of the Green Scapular at Immaculate Heart of Mary Parish in Monona, Wisconsin, in the Diocese of Madison. The shrine can be traced as far back as 1950 when the parish was founded. "When the permanent parish church was finally completed in 1961, it was designed with this Marian devotion in mind." At the time, in 1961, it was "the World Shrine of Our Lady of the Green Scapular." "A mosaic on the front of the building depicts Our Lady giving the Green Scapular to Sr. Justine Bisqueyburu, the visionary who received it from her in 1840 in France."

With Marian devotion falling out of style in the late 1960s and 1970s, the shrine was removed from the parish and traded hands several times. However, there has been renewed interest in the shrine and on the 18th of June, 2023, Immaculate Heart of Mary in Monona, Wisconsin was once again designated a shrine to Our Lady of the Green Scapular.

== See also ==
- Brown Scapular
- Blue Scapular
- Red Scapular
- Fivefold Scapular
- Miraculous Medal
