= Suor Orsola Benincasa University of Naples =

- Università degli Studi Suor Orsola Benincasa - Napoli
- Type: Private
- Established: 1895
- Rector: Prof. Lucio d'Alessandro
- Students: 8,918 (2012/13)
- Location: Naples, Italy
- Sports teams: CUS Napoli
- Affiliations: BioGeM
- Website: www.unisob.na.it

The Suor Orsola Benincasa University of Naples (Italian: Università degli Studi Suor Orsola Benincasa - Napoli) is a private university located in Naples, Italy. It was founded in 1895, named after the venerable sister Ursula Benincasa and is organized into 8 departments.

== Organization ==
The university is divided into 8 departments

- Education
- Law
- Letters
- Economics
- Archaeology
- Art History
- Psychology
- Social Sciences

== Pagliara Museum ==
The school also administers the art collection of the Pagliara Foundation, established in 1947. Since the museum's inauguration in 1952, its collection has supported the school's educational and research activities. Works are organized chronologically and presented in the cells of the nun's cloister, with each representing the esthetic vision of a brief period from the 16th to the 19th centuries. The collection is open by appointment to those unaffiliated with the university.
