= Rosary and scapular =

Christian devotional articles

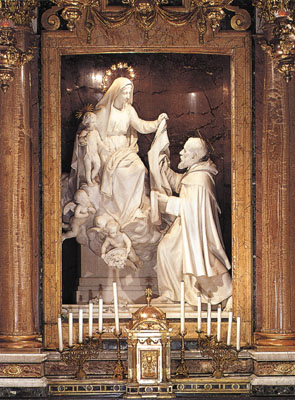
Statue of the Virgin Mary giving the Scapular to Simon Stock (19th-century) by Alfonso Balzico located in the church of Santa Maria della Vittoria, Rome

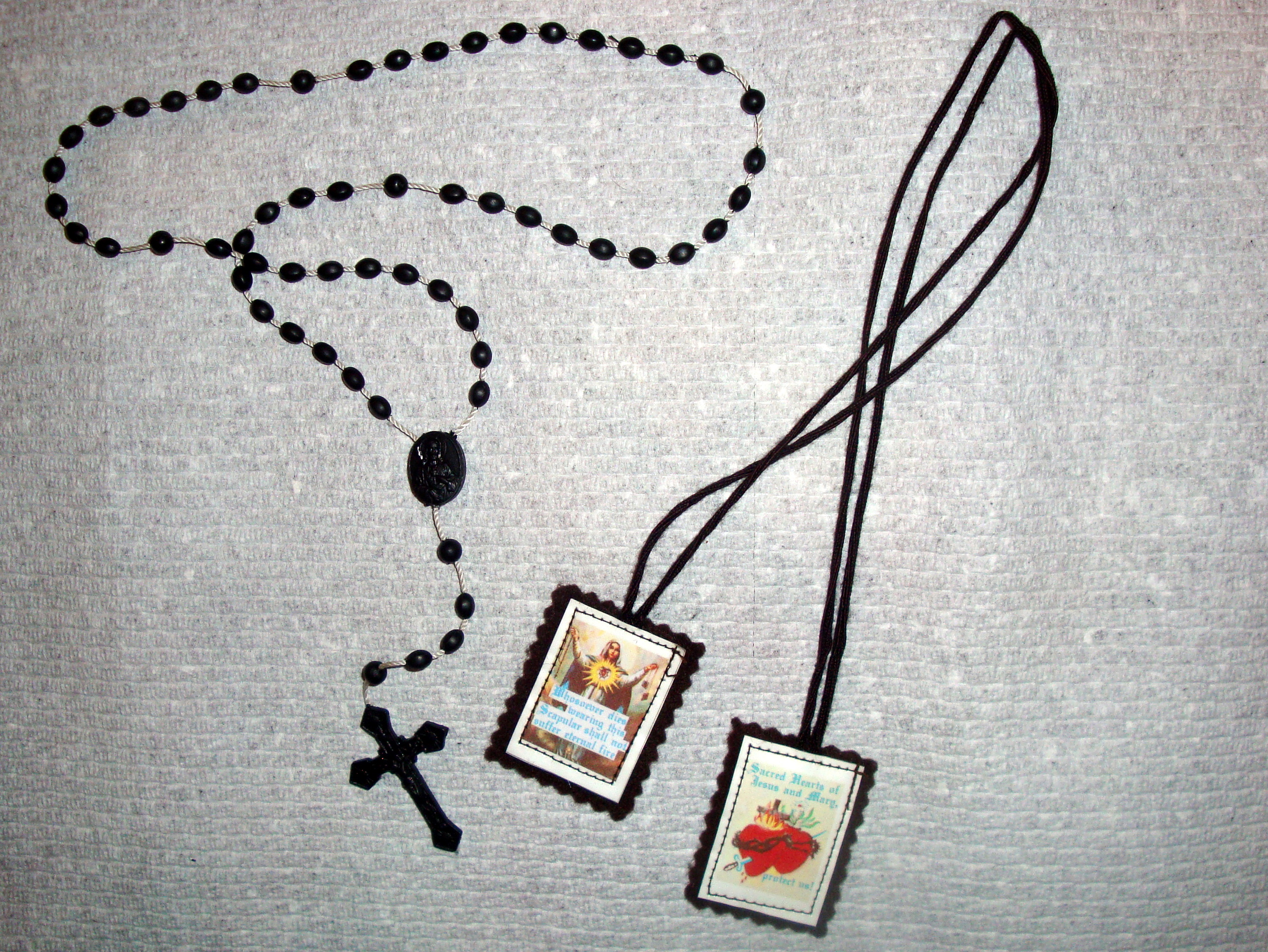
Rosary and scapular

The exact origins of both the rosary and scapular are subject to debate among scholars. Pious tradition maintains that both the rosary and the brown Scapular of Our Lady of Mount Carmel were given by the Virgin Mary to Dominic and Simon Stock respectively during the 13th century. Historical records document their growth during the 16th and 17th centuries in Europe. By the early 20th century, they had gained such a strong following among Catholics worldwide that Josef Hilgers, writing in the Catholic Encyclopedia of 1914, stated: "Like the Rosary, the Brown scapular has become the badge of the devout Catholic."

Known as sacramentals, these objects have since the Second Vatican Council acquired the term "devotional articles", to distinguish these from liturgical actions and items used therewith, such as candles, chrism, or sprinkling with holy water.

As with all religious articles, the use of the rosary and the scapular are optional for Roman Catholics. Specific indulgences have been associated with each of them. This article reviews the history, Mariology and the development of the rosary and the scapular as important expressions of popular piety in the Latin Rite of the Catholic Church.

== Devotions ==
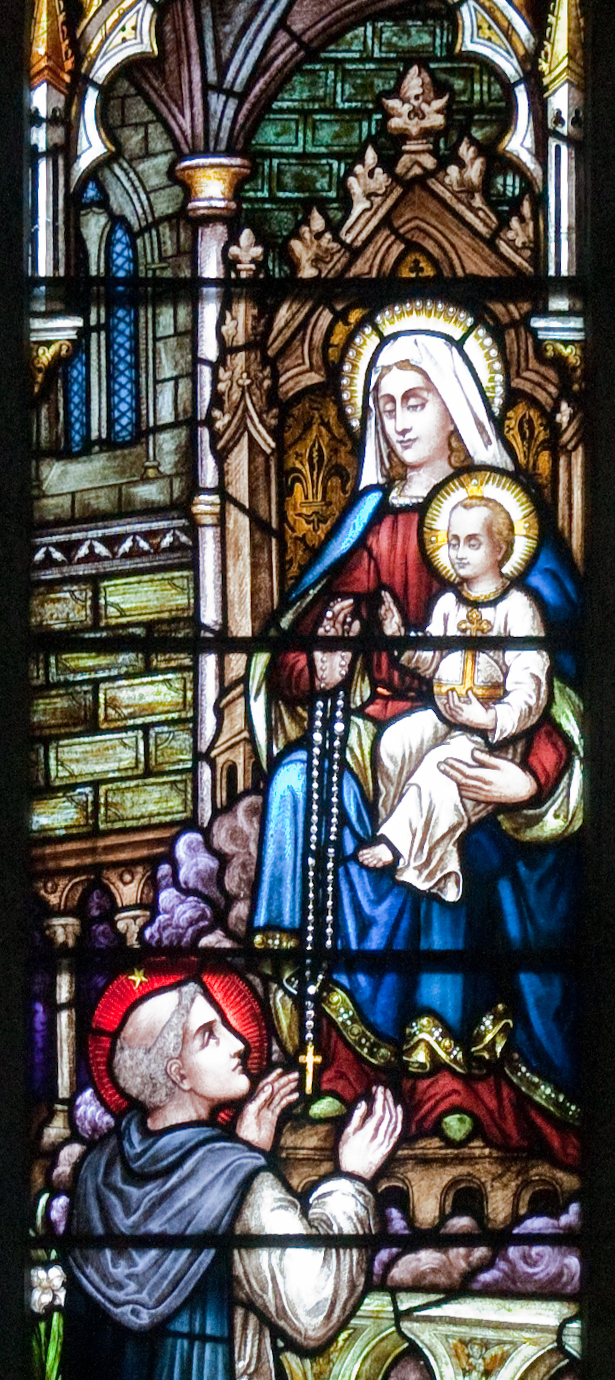
"St Dominic Receives the Rosary from the Virgin Mary", Church of the Sacred Heart in Glengarriff

The rosary and the scapular are viewed as devotional elements of Catholicism. However, although many of the faithful choose to pray the rosary and wear the scapular, the link between the rosary and the scapular is not formally reflected in Church doctrine.

== Traditional accounts ==
=== Dominic ===
According to the tradition of the Dominicans, the rosary was given to Dominic in an apparition by the Blessed Virgin Mary in the year 1214 in the church of Prouille, the Marian apparition receiving the title of Our Lady of the Rosary. However, many scholarly researchers suggest a more gradual and organic development of the rosary, and some attribute it to Alanus de Rupe. Some sources question the authenticity of the apparition to Saint Dominic.

=== Simon Stock ===
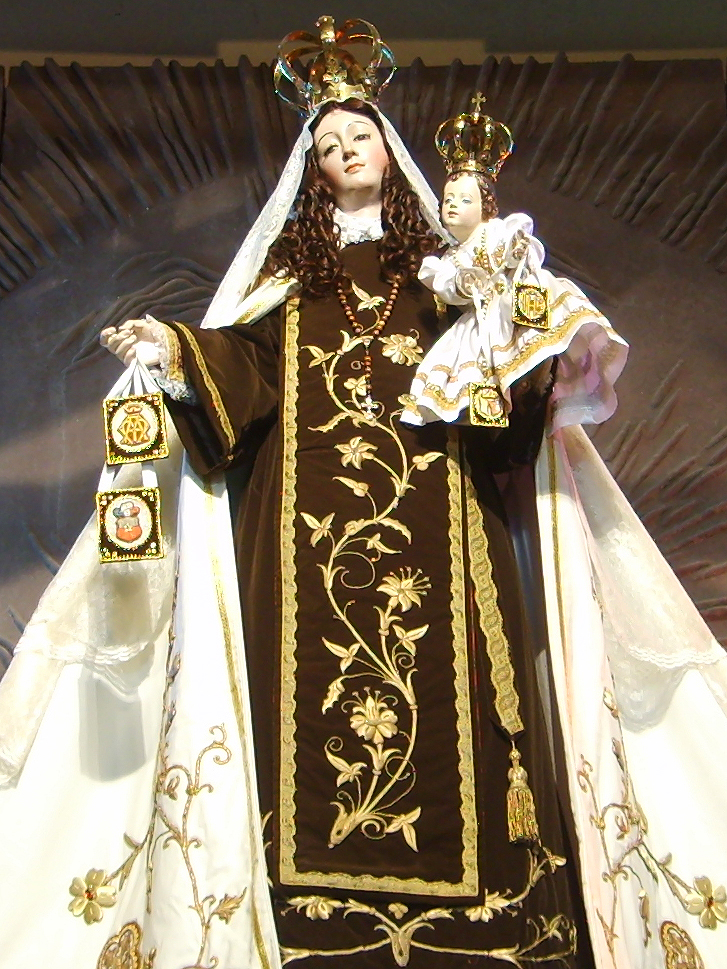
Statue of Our Lady of Mount Carmel (Chile)

Carmelite tradition holds that the Blessed Virgin Mary appeared to Simon Stock in Cambridge, England in 1251 in answer to his appeal for help for his oppressed order, and recommended the Brown Scapular to him. Originally, the scapular was a broad band of cloth over the shoulders, serving as an apron, still worn as part of the religious habit by a number of orders of monks and friars. The Brown Scapular has been a key element of Carmelite history since the late 13th century.

Like the purported vision of Mary to Dominic, the earliest mention of Simon Stock's vision comes over 100 years later, and there is a lack of documentary evidence that would demonstrate the truth or historicity of the apparition. While Richard Copsey questioned the fact that any apparition took place with respect to the scapular, Although the historicity of the scapular vision is disputed, the scapular itself has remained for all Carmelites a sign of Mary's motherly protection and as a personal commitment to follow Jesus in the footsteps of his Mother, the perfect model for all his disciples.

== Historical developments ==
=== Confraternities ===
The beginning of the 18th century witnessed a significant growth in Marian confraternities, such as the Confraternities of the Rosary. A small number of such confraternities had started sometime in the 15th century, through the preaching of Alan de Rupe. Their numbers began to grow under the supervision of the Dominicans, which also helped create a more uniform format for the rosary. An important Apostolic Constitution on the Rosary Confraternity was issued by Pope Leo XIII in 1898.

The approval of the "Confraternity of the Scapular" for every diocese helped the spread of that devotion, reaching its culmination in 1726 via the extension of the Feast of Our Lady of Mount Carmel (July 16) to the universal church.

=== Marian apparitions ===
In the mid-19th century, the reported Marian apparitions of Our Lady of Lourdes gathered significant attention, and provided momentum for the spread of the rosary. The spread of the devotion to both the rosary and the scapular was influenced by Marian apparitions of Our Lady of Fátima reported by three Portuguese children in 1917. The Fátima messages placed a strong emphasis on the rosary, as the apparition reportedly identified herself as The Lady of the Rosary. The visions and messages also encouraged the wearing of the Brown Scapular, and in the final apparition on 13 October 1917, the Miracle of the Sun also featured a vision of Our Lady of Mount Carmel.

=== Associations ===
The 20th century witnessed the development of a number of Marian organizations. The Blue Army of Our Lady of Fatima was formed in 1946 in the United States and through "Scapular Magazine" helped enroll one million Americans to pray the rosary based on the Fátima messages regarding the consecration of Russia. The Blue Army eventually reached a larger audience of several million members.

== Mariology ==
=== Papal endorsements ===
Leo XIII dedicated the human race to the Sacred Heart of Jesus. But in his analysis the re-Christianisation was not possible without Mary. So Leo XIII promoted Marian devotion via ten encyclicals on the rosary and instituted the Catholic custom of daily rosary prayer during the month of October. In 1883 he also created the Feast of Queen of the Holy Rosary.

Pope John Paul II stated that: "The scapular is essentially a habit which evokes the protection of the Blessed Virgin Mary in this life and in the passage to the fullness of eternal glory." He further stated that he received his own first Brown Scapular of Mount Carmel at age ten when his Marian devotion was taking shape, and he continued to wear it into his papacy. When he gained consciousness before being operated on to remove the bullet that wounded him in St. Peter's Square on 13 May 1981, he instructed the doctors not to remove his Brown Scapular during the operation.

=== Role of the saints ===
Teresa of Avila, Thérèse of Lisieux and John of the Cross were all Carmelites and wore the monastic Brown Scapular of Our Lady of Mount Carmel. Alphonsus Liguori of the Redemptorists and John Bosco of the Salesians were especially devoted to Our Lady of Mount Carmel and were both buried wearing their Brown Scapulars. John Bosco's Brown Scapular was later exhumed in very good condition and is kept as a relic in the Basilica of Our Lady Help of Christians, Turin, Italy.

Claude la Colombiere, the confessor of Margaret-Marie Alacoque, had a strong devotion to the Brown Scapular and considered it one of the most favorite and effective Marian devotions. He also stated that: "If a person wants to die in his sins, he will die in his sins, but he will not die wearing the Brown Scapular."

Louis de Montfort is widely known for his promotion of the rosary. Montfort developed specific methods of praying the rosary to help the meditative process and emphasized the need for purity of intention, attention and reverence in prayers.

== Meditative basis ==
Saints and popes have emphasized the meditative benefits of the rosary and the scapular. Pope Pius XII said of the Brown Scapular: "Let it be your sign of consecration to the Immaculate Heart of Mary". And in his encyclical Ingruentium Malorum on the rosary Pius XII stated: "And truly, from the frequent meditation on the Mysteries, the soul little by little and imperceptibly draws and absorbs the virtues they contain, and is wondrously enkindled with a longing for things immortal, and becomes strongly and easily impelled to follow the path which Christ Himself and His Mother have followed."

Although Pope John Paul II is best known for his devotion to the rosary, he stated that he viewed the scapular as a "habit" to orient one's Christian life: "The sign of the Scapular points to an effective synthesis of Marian spirituality, which nourishes the devotion of believers and makes them sensitive to the Virgin Mother's loving presence in their lives. ...Devotion to her cannot be limited to prayers and tributes in her honor on certain occasions, but must become a 'habit', that is, a permanent orientation of one's own Christian conduct."

The wearing of a scapular has been viewed as constant meditation by Bishop Leo De Goesbriand: "Wherever I am, whatever I am doing, Mary never sees me without seeing upon my body an evidence of my devotion to her."

From a venerative viewpoint, Etienne Richer points out the rosary and the scapular as the key devotions that harmonize with Catholic Liturgy in the meditative process of the veneration of the Blessed Virgin Mary.

The Rosary and the devotional scapular continue to be linked in the 21st century.

== Gallery ==
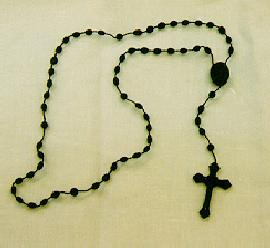
A simple Rosary

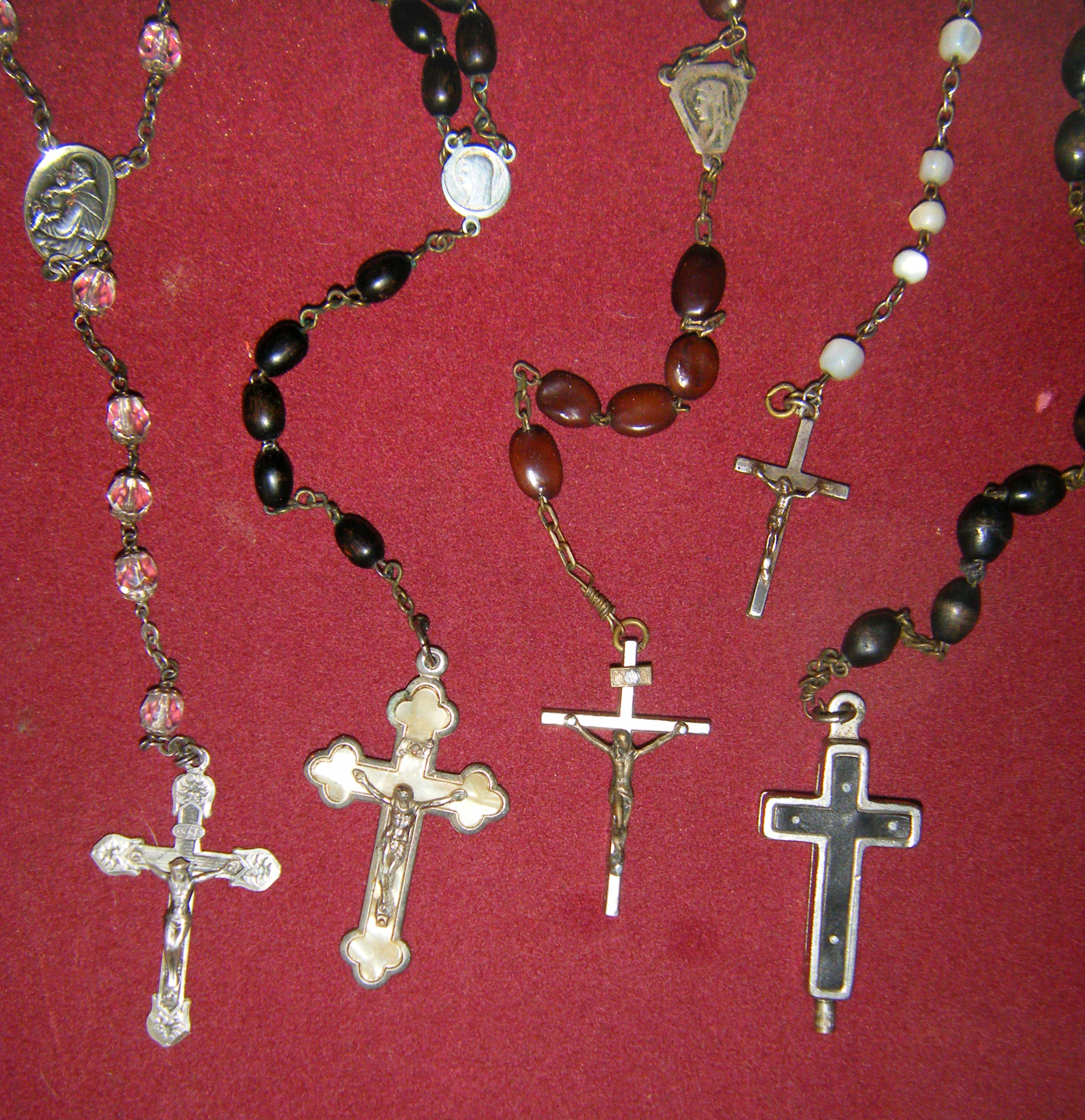
Various rosaries with Crucifixes

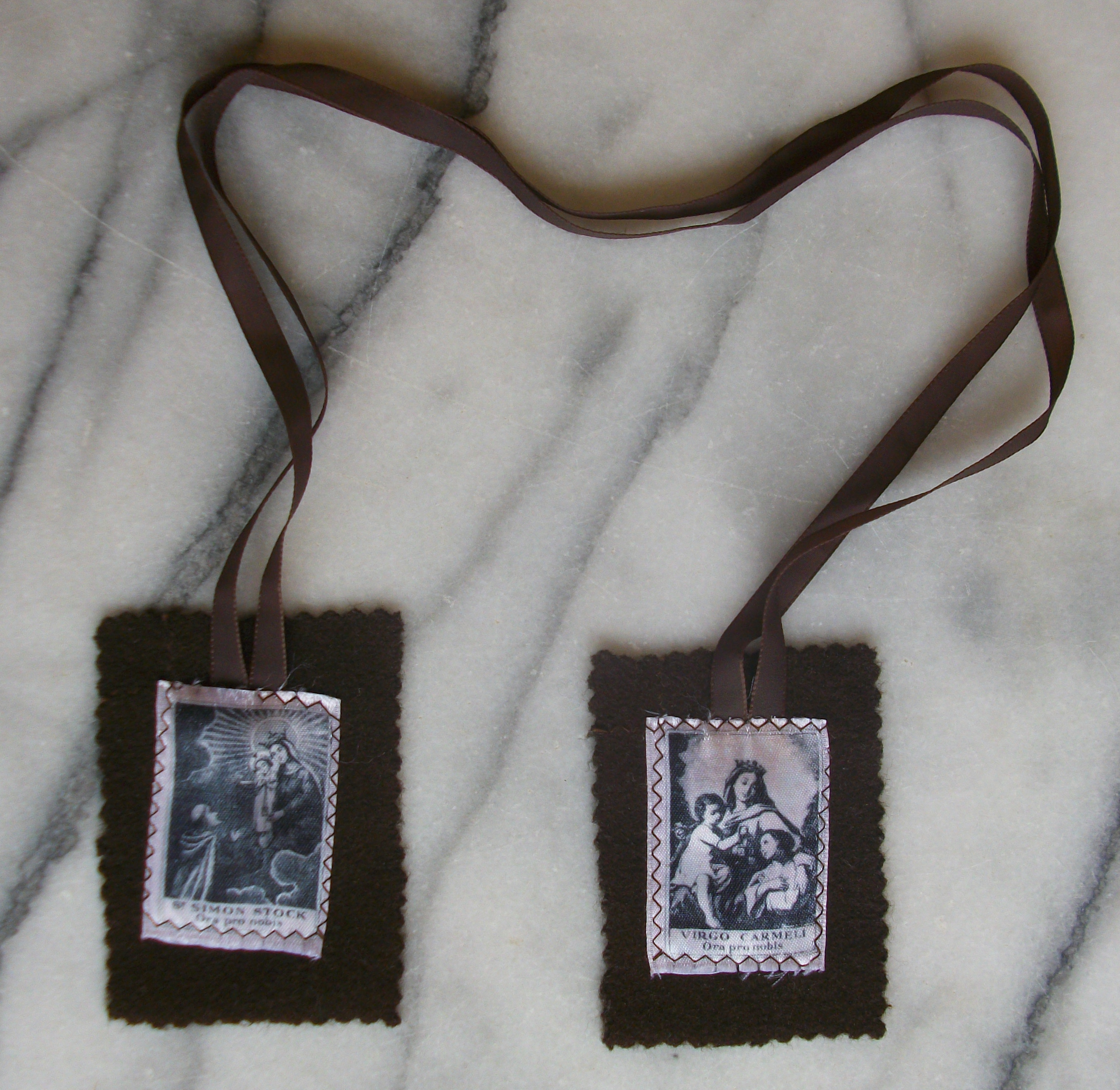
The Brown Scapular of Our Lady of Mount Carmel

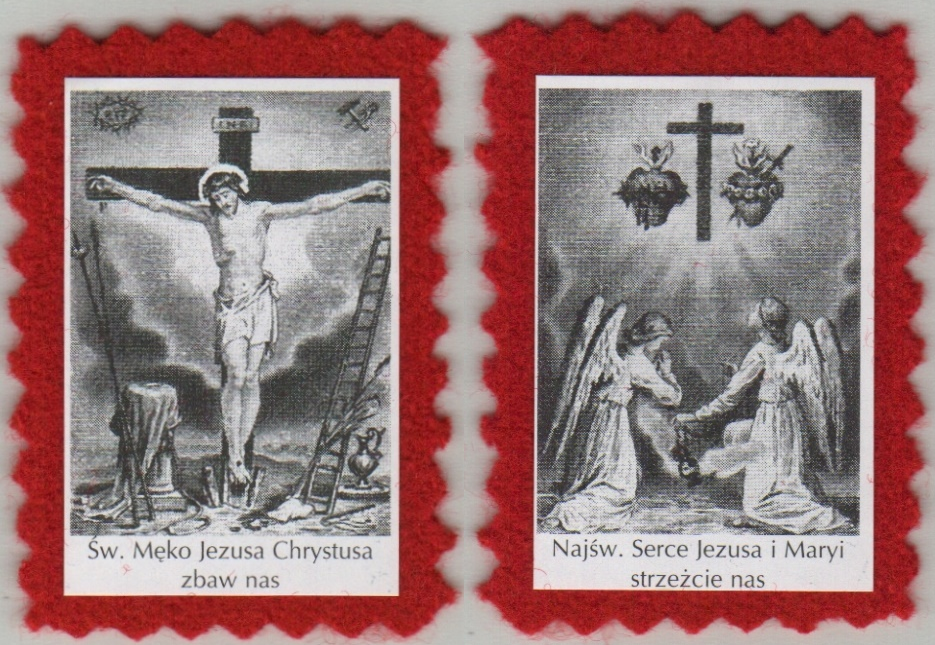
The Red Scapular of the Passion

== See also ==
- Rosary
- Scapular
