= Ursula Benincasa =

Italian nun and mystic (1550–1618)

Venerable Ursula Benincasa RRTT
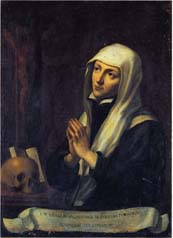
- Born: 21 October 1547
- Died: 20 October 1618 (aged 70); Naples

Ursula Benincasa, (Italian: Orsola Benincasa), born around 1550 and died in Naples on 20 October 1618, was an Italian nun and mystic, founder of the Oblate Sisters and Hermitage of the Contemplative Sisters of the Immaculate Conception. She was declared venerable.

== Life ==
Ursula Benincasa was born in Naples to Girolamo and Vincenza Genuina Benincasa. She was the youngest daughter of eight siblings. Her family was originally from Siena related to that of Catherine of Siena.

With great religious fervor, the young Ursula tried to enter the Capuchin Poor Clares of the monastery of Santa Maria di Gerusalemme, but was too young. Around 1576, she retired to a hermitage near the Castel Sant'Elmo in the Vomero district. She quickly acquired a reputation for holiness and attracted many followers. She told Gregorio Navarro, Abbot of Francavilla, of a vision in which the Blessed Virgin had directed her to build a church in honour of the Most Holy Conception of Mary. The church, built near Castel Sant'Elmo, was completed in 1582.

Rumors of her visions and ecstasies raised complaints and in May 1582 she was called to Rome, where was subjected to rigorous examinations by a commission which included Cardinal Giulio Antonio Santorio, then Grand Inquisitor in Rome, and Philip Neri, founder of the Congregation of the Oratory. They sent her on to Frascati where she was interviewed by Pope Gregory XIII, who placed her under the direction of Saint Philip Neri.

== Theatine sisters ==
In 1583, she founded the Oblate Sisters of the Immaculate Conception of the Virgin Mary next to the church at Castel Sant'Elmo. Her sisters, among them Christina who became the first superioress, and some of her nieces formed the community. Little by little, other pious women joined them, to the number of sixty, whose members devoted themselves to the education of youth, especially of the girls.

In 1617, Ursula Benincasa had a vision of the Virgin Mary and the baby Jesus. This vision is at the origin of the Blue Scapular of the Immaculate Conception and the foundation of the Hermitage of the Contemplative Sisters of the Immaculate Conception. The rule was that of an ascetic life devoted to contemplative prayer to support the apostolic work of the Oblates. In 1617, Benincasa had the revelation that her community was to join the Theatine Order, which was authorized by Pope Urban VIII in 1633.

After her death, a large monastic complex was built around the first buildings. After the Italian unification, a free girls' school opened there. Since 2004, this complex has been the seat of the Suor Orsola Benincasa University of Naples.

== Beatification process ==
Benincasa's spiritual writings were approved by theologians on 7 August 1793. On 7 August 1793 her religious virtues were recognised by Pope Pius VI, who declared her venerable.

== See also ==
- Blue Scapular of the Immaculate Conception

== Bibliography ==
- Silvana Menchi: Dizionario Biografico degli Italiani - Volume 8 (1966), dans l'Encyclopédie Treccani.
- Vittoria Fiorelli, Una santa della città: suor Orsola Benincasa e la devozione napoletana tra Cinquecento e Seicento, Naples, Editoriale scientifica, séries Series: Historica (Istituto universitario di magistero "Suor Orsola Benincasa"), 2001.
