= Red Scapular of the Passion =

Catholic sacramental

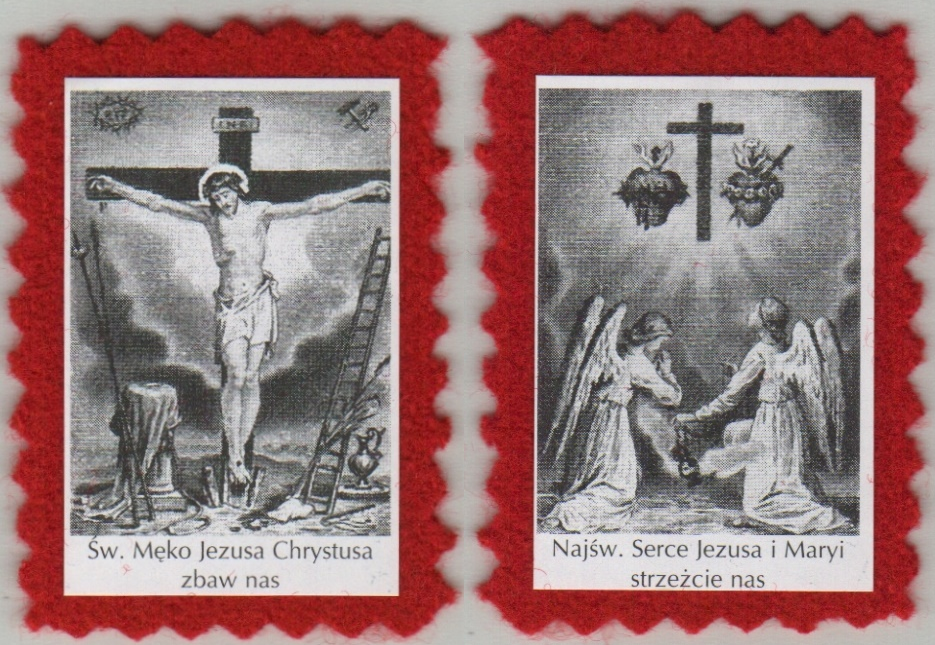
The Red Scapular of the Passion of Our Lord and the Sacred Hearts of Jesus and Mary

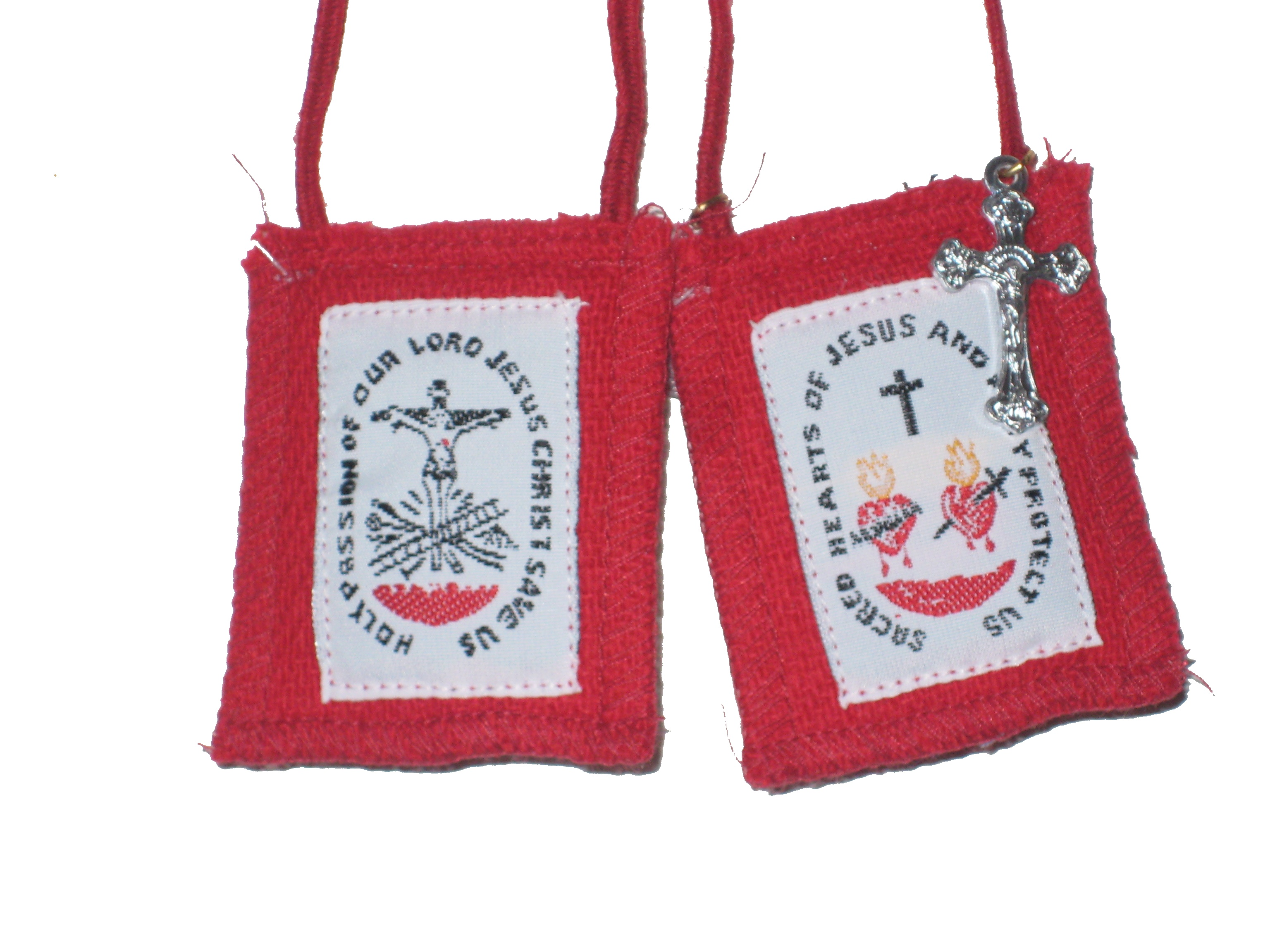
Fivefold Scapular with Red Scapular of the Passion showing and tiny crucifix attached

The Red Scapular of the Passion of Our Lord and the Sacred Hearts of Jesus and Mary is a Catholic sacramental scapular associated with the Vincentians. It is often just called the Scapular of the Passion or simply the Red Scapular.

The Red Scapular of the Passion is a popular scapular and forms the uppermost portion of the Fivefold Scapular.

== Origin ==
Louise-Apolline-Aline Andriveau was born on 7 May 1810 in Saint-Pourçain-sur-Sioule (Allier) to Leonardo and Apolline (Grangie) Andriveau. Her father was a notary who saw to it that she received a good education. The family moved to Paris when her father received a promotion. Upon the death of her mother, it was decided that she should complete her studies at the convent of Saint Elizabeth.

In 1830 Catherine Labouré had reported a vision of the Blessed Virgin, which she had experienced in the chapel of the motherhouse of the Daughters of Charity in Paris, which led to the development of the Miraculous Medal. Ten years later, in 1840, Sister Justine Bisqueyburu disclosed a vision of the Blessed Virgin she had purportedly experienced in the Daughters of Charity house in Blangy. This gave rise to the so-called Green Scapular.

In 1833, she joined the Daughters of Charity of Saint Vincent de Paul as Sister Apolline, and was sent to the convent in Troyes where she spent the next thirty-eight years. Initially, she taught school but was later assigned to visiting the poor, and caring for the sisters chapel. She had a particular devotion to the Passion of Christ.

Sister Apolline reported that from 26 July 1846 to 14 September 1846 visions of Jesus and Mary appeared to her in the convent in Troyes, France and promised her that those who wear the scapular faithfully and contemplated the Passion of Jesus Christ would be granted a great increase of faith, hope and charity every Friday.

She described the apparition of July 26, 1846:

Being in the chapel in the evening of the octave day of our Holy Father (St. Vincent de Paul), I saw, or thought I saw, Our Lord dressed in a flowing robe of a red color with a blue mantle hanging from his shoulders...He had in his hand a red scapular on which he was represented on the cross..."

She further said that in a subsequent vision on September 14 (the Feast of the Exaltation of the Holy Cross) that Jesus told her that

The priests of the Mission alone are to give this scapular, and those who wear it when blessed by them will receive every Friday a full remission of their sins, and a great increase of faith, hope, and charity."

== Approval ==
Sister Apolline's spiritual director advised her to write a letter describing her experiences to Jean-Baptiste Etienne, Superior-General of the Congregation of the Mission (Vincentians). Etienne did not, at first, attach any particular importance to Sister Apolline's revelations, but being in Rome the following year, brought up the subject to Pope Pius IX. Much to Etienne's surprise the pope made no objection to the devotion being adopted, and even encouraged it, because of its message of redemption and mercy. Pius approved the use of the scapular by a rescript on June 25, 1847. He further granted to the priests of the Congregation of the Mission the faculty of blessing the scapular and investing the faithful with it. The Superior-General was allowed to communicate the faculty of blessing and investing the scapular to priests outside the Vincentian order and such a scapular can now be invested by any Catholic priest.

== Description ==
The scapular and its bands must be made of red wool and unlike most scapulars it is adorned with specifically described images which are essential to it.

One side of the scapular shows a crucifix, some of the Instruments of the Passion, and the words "Holy Passion of Our Lord Jesus Christ Save Us." The other side depicts a small cross above the Sacred Heart of Jesus and the Sacred Heart of Mary plus the words "Sacred Hearts of Jesus and Mary, protect us."

== Promotion ==
In the United States of America, between 1953 and August 2008, the Red Scapular was officially promoted by the Marian Center operated by the Daughters of Charity of Saint Vincent de Paul (a branch of the same order to which Sister Appolline belonged).

== Similar scapulars ==
The Red Scapular of the Passion described herein should not be confused with:

- The Black Scapular of the Passion associated with the Passionists
- The Red Scapular of the Most Precious Blood
- The White Scapular of the Sacred Hearts of Jesus and Mary associated with the Daughters of the Sacred Heart.
- The Scapular of the Sacred Heart based on the revelations claimed by Estelle Faguette at Pellevoisin

== See also ==
- Rosary and scapular
- Congregation of the Mission
