= Justine Bisqueyburu =

French religious sister (1917–1903)

Justine Bisqueyburu DC
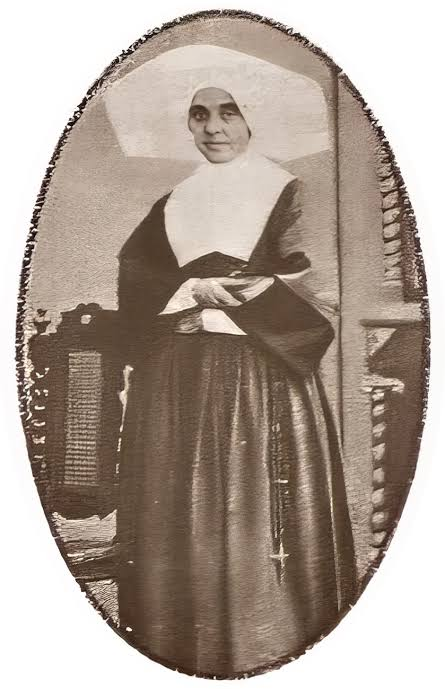

Personal life
- Born: 11 November 1817 Mauléon-Licharre, Pyrénées-Atlantiques First French Empire
- Died: 23 September 1903 (aged 91) Carcassonne, Aude French Third Republic
- Parent(s): Clement Bisqueyburu (father); Ursula Albine d'Anglade (mother)

Religious life
- Religion: Christianity (Catholicism)
- Institute: Daughters of Charity of Saint Vincent de Paul

Justine Bisqueyburu (11 November 1817 – 23 September 1903) was a French religious sister and visionary known for creating the Green Scapular after a Marian apparition in 1840.

== Biography ==
=== Early life ===
Bisqueyburu was born on 11 November 1817 in Mauléon-Licharre, Pyrénées-Atlantiques, France, to Clement Bisqueyburu and Ursula Albine d'Anglade. Her father was a merchant. Orphaned at a young age, Bisqueyburu was brought up by her maternal aunt. On 28 January 1840, during her retreat in preparation for entrance into the Daughters of Charity of Saint Vincent de Paul, Bisqueyburu was in the chapel at Rue du Bac in Paris. While she was at prayer, the Virgin Mary reportedly appeared to her, dressed in a long white gown and a light blue mantle; her hair was not covered, and she said nothing. At the end of the retreat, the Virgin Mary appeared to her again, and the vision recurred five times during the latter's novitiate. On each occasion, the vision was identical to the first; on each occasion, Our Lady said nothing.

=== Green Scapular ===
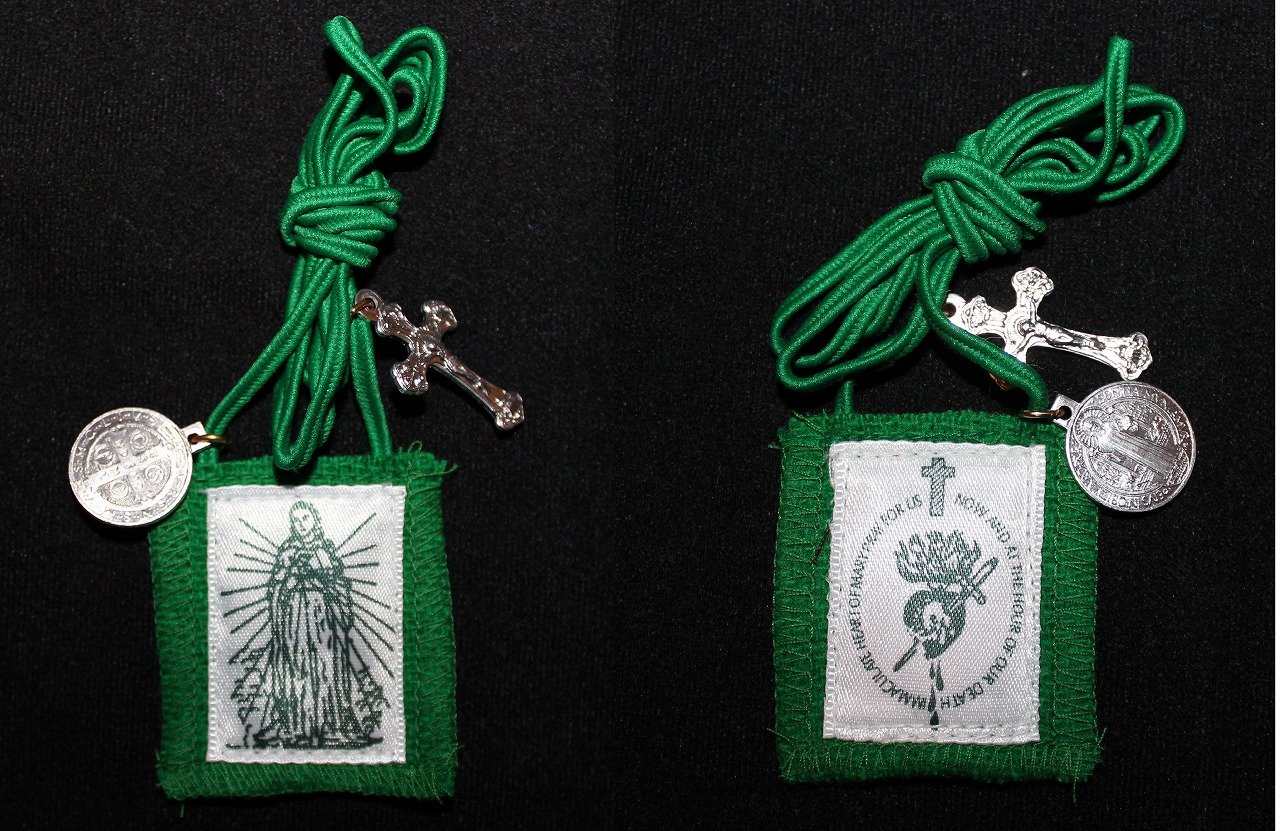
The Green Scapular with a small medal of Saint Benedict

Shortly after she had received the religious habit, Bisqueyburu was sent to teach the poor in Blangy-sur-Bresle. On 8 September 1840 (the Feast of the Nativity of Mary), while Bisqueyburu was at prayer, the Virgin Mary again appeared, holding in her right hand her heart surrounded by flames, and in her left a type of scapular consisting of a single piece of green cloth strung on green cords. On the cloth was an image of the Virgin as she had appeared to Bisqueyburu, holding her heart in her right hand. On the cloth's reverse was "a Heart all ablaze with rays more dazzling than the sun and as transparent as crystal". The heart was pierced by a sword, surmounted by a gold cross and with words in the shape of an oval around the heart: "Immaculate Heart of Mary, pray for us now and at the hour of our death". Bisqueyburu heard an interior voice say that the Virgin Mary wished the scapular to be promoted widely as an instrument in the conversion of souls. She told her superior about the visions and, subsequently, her spiritual director, Jean-Marie Aladel, C.M. who was skeptical and told her she was deluded.

=== Later life ===
During the Crimean War, Bisqueyburu was sent to serve in Constantinople. In 1856 she went to the military hospital at Val-de-Grâce in Paris, where she remained for two years. In 1858 she was commissioned to open the military hospital of Rennes; later that year she was placed in charge of a military hospital in Algiers, a position she held for nine years.

In 1867, her superiors sent her to Italy in the service of the Papal Zouaves. After spending three days and three nights on the battlefield, she went to Rome to equip and organize three ambulances. She was held in high esteem at the Papal Court, where Pope Pius IX appreciated her valor, and occasionally allowed her to accompany him in his walks through the Papal gardens.

To the end of her life, Bisqueyburu maintained silence about these visions, and spoke only with her superior and her spiritual director about them. The Green Scapular was approved by Pope Pius IX in 1870. Bisqueyburu died on 23 September 1903, at the age of 91.
