= Daughters of Charity of Saint Vincent de Paul =

Catholic society of apostolic life

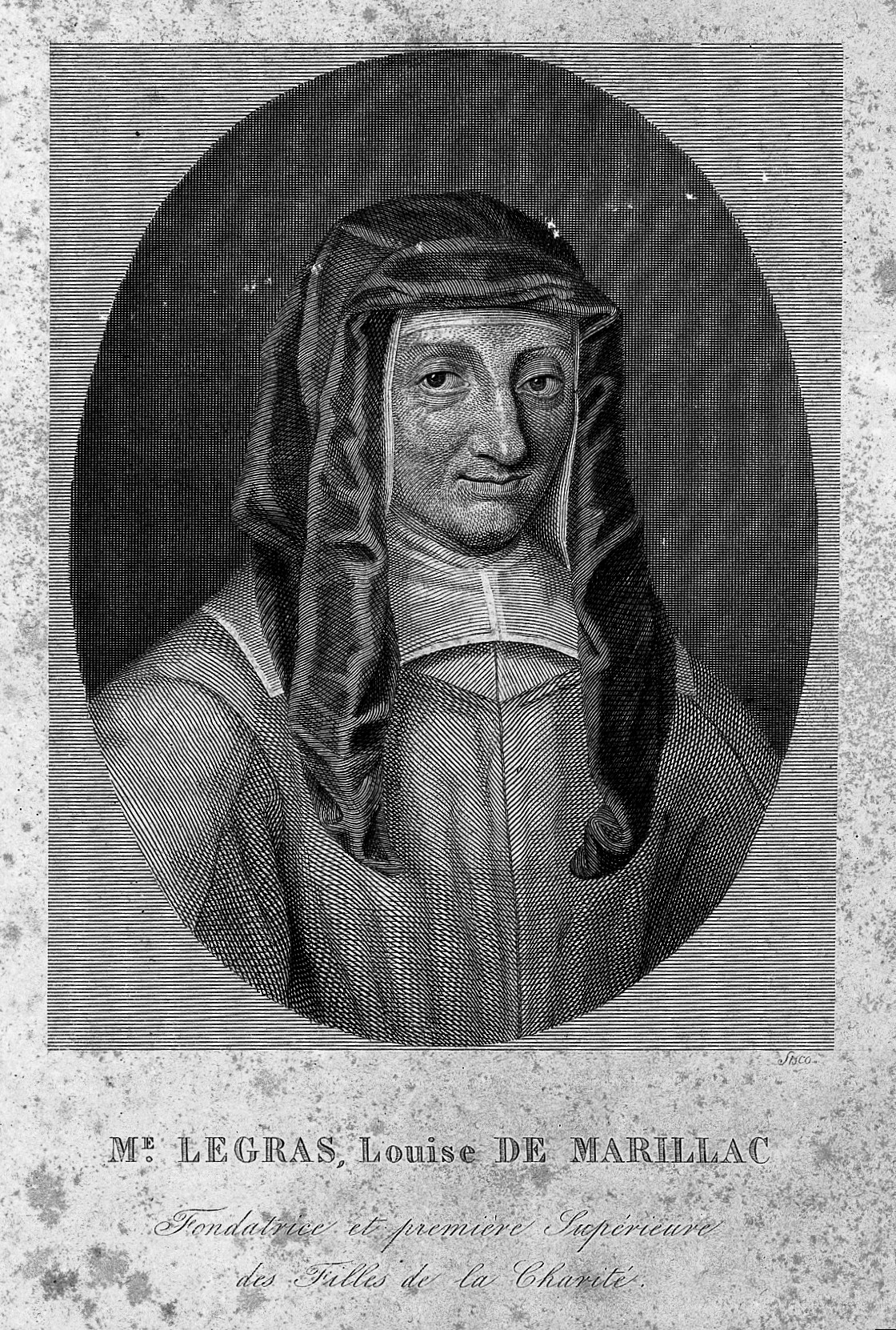
- Saint Louise de Marillac, co-founder of the Company of the Daughters of Charity of Saint Vincent de Paul
- Abbreviation: D.C.
- Established: 29 November 1633; 392 years ago
- Founders: St. Vincent de Paul; St. Louise de Marillac
- Founded at: Paris, France
- Type: Centralized Religious Institute of Consecrated Life of Pontifical Right (for Women)
- Headquarters: Motherhouse; Rue du Bac, Paris, France
- Region served: Europe, Asia, Americas, Africa
- Members: 14,000
- motto: The charity of Christ urges us
- Superioress General: Sister Françoise Petit, DC
- Parent organization: Roman Catholic Church
- Website: daughtersofcharity.org

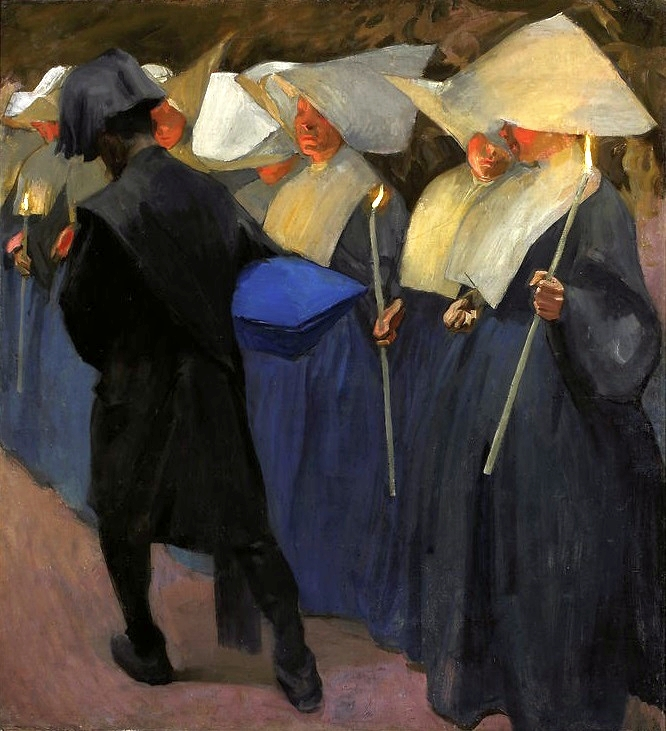
A painting of cornette-wearing Daughters of Charity by Karol Tichy, depicting a funeral in an orphanage run by the sisters (National Museum in Warsaw)

The Company of the Daughters of Charity of Saint Vincent de Paul (Latin: Societas Filiarum Caritatis a Sancto Vincentio de Paulo; abbreviated DC), commonly called the Daughters of Charity or Sisters of Charity of Saint Vincent de Paul, is a society of apostolic life for women within the Catholic Church. Its members make annual vows throughout their life, which leaves them always free to leave, without the need of ecclesiastical permission. They were founded in 1633 by Vincent de Paul and state that they are devoted to serving the poor through the corporal and spiritual works of mercy.

They have been popularly known in France as "the Grey Sisters" from the color of their traditional religious habit, which was originally grey, then bluish grey. The 1996 publication The Vincentian Family Tree presents an overview of related communities from a genealogical perspective. Members use the initials DC after their names.

The Society's current Superior General, appointed on 20 April 2020, is Françoise Petit.

== Foundation ==
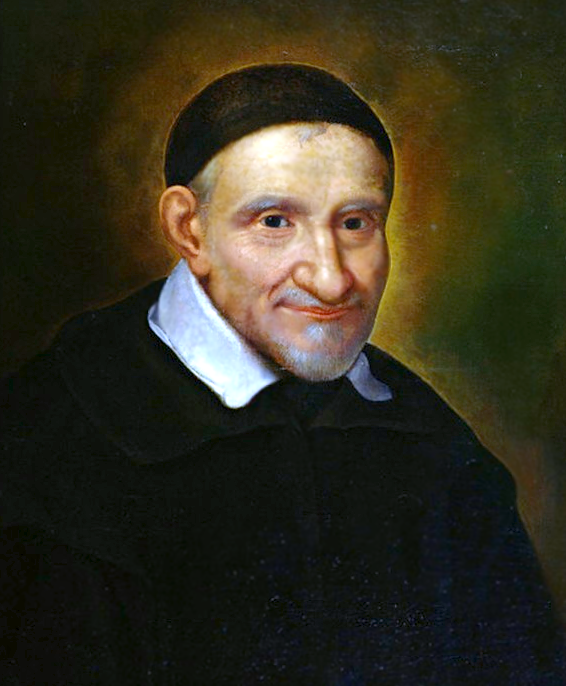
Vincent de Paul

The institute was founded by Vincent de Paul, a French priest, and Louise de Marillac, a widow. The need for organization in working with the poor suggested to De Paul the forming of a confraternity among the women of his parish in Châtillon-les-Dombes. It was so successful that it spread from the rural districts to Paris, where the noble ladies often found it hard to give personal care to the needs of the poor and sent their servants to minister to those in need; but the work was often slighted as unimportant. Vincent de Paul remedied this by referring interested young women from the countryside to work with the "Ladies of Charity" in Paris.

These young women formed the nucleus of the Company of the Daughters of Charity now spread over the world. On 29 November 1633, the eve of St. Andrew, de Marillac began a more systematic training of the women, particularly for the care of the sick. The sisters lived in the community in order to better develop their spiritual life so as to more effectively carry out their mission of service. The Daughters of Charity differed from other religious congregations of that time in that they were not cloistered. They maintained the necessary mobility and availability, and lived among those whom they served. From the beginning, the community motto was: "The charity of Christ impels us!"

The newly formed Daughters of Charity set up soup kitchens, organized community hospitals, established schools and homes for orphaned children, offered job training, taught the young to read and write, and improved prison conditions. The hospital of St John the Evangelist in the province of Angers was the first hospital entrusted to the care of the Daughters of Charity. Louise de Marillac and Vincent de Paul both died in 1660, and by this time there were more than forty houses of the Daughters of Charity in France, and the sick poor were cared for in their own dwellings in twenty-six parishes in Paris.

== French Revolution ==
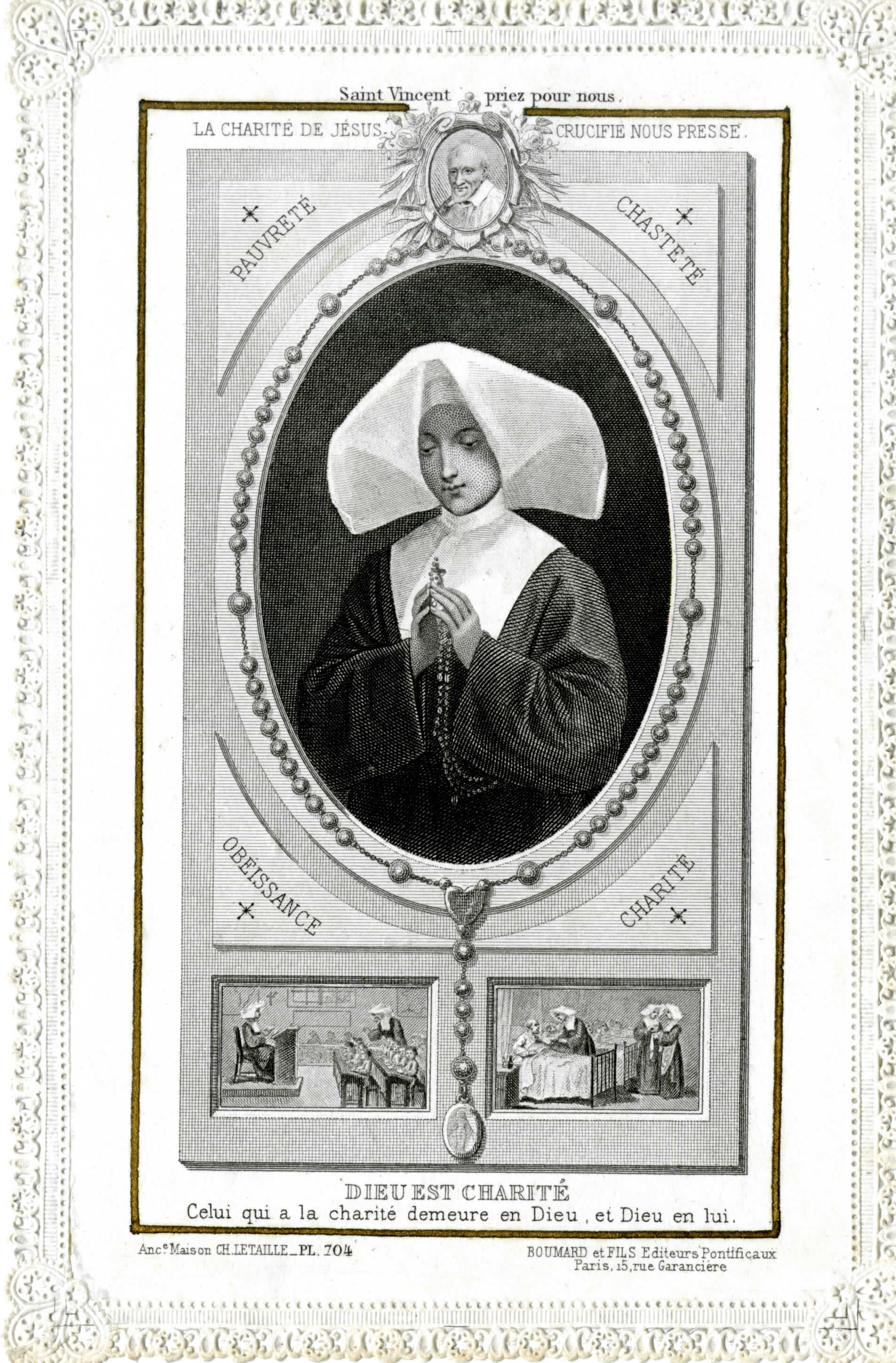
Daughters of Charity holy card. University of Dayton Libraries.

Anticlerical forces in the French Revolution were determined to shut down all convents. In 1789 France had 426 houses; the sisters numbered about 6000 in Europe. In 1792, the sisters were ordered to quit the motherhouse; the community was officially disbanded in 1793. An oath to support the Revolution was imposed on all former members of religious orders who performed a service that was remunerated by the state. Taking this oath was seen as breaking off with the Church while those who refused to do so were considered counter-revolutionaries.

In Angers, revolutionary authorities decided to make an example of sisters Marie-Anne Vaillot and Odile Baumgarten in order to demonstrate what refusal to take the oath would mean. In early 1794 they were publicly executed. At a ceremony in Rome on 19 February 1984 Pope John Paul II beatified ninety-nine persons who died for the faith in Angers, including Vaillot and Baumgarten. Their feast day is 1 February.

Sister Marguerite Rutan was the Superior of the community that staffed the hospital at Dax. The six sisters had refused to take the revolutionary oath. The Revolutionary committee wanted to remove the Superior of the Sisters and looked for a motive to arrest her. A false testimony allowed them to say that Sr. Marguerite was unpatriotic, a fanatic against the principles of the Revolution and that she tried to convince the wounded soldiers to desert and join the royalist army of Vendéens. On 9 April 1794 Sister Marguerite Rutan was condemned to death and guillotined at Poyanne Place not far from the prison. She was beatified Sunday, 19 June 2011 in Dax, France. Her feast day is 26 June.

Sisters Marie-Madeleine Fontaine, Marie-Françoise Lanel, Thérèse Fantou, and Jeanne Gérard from the House of Charity in Arras were guillotined in Cambrai 26 June 1794. Waiting for the cart to take them to the guillotine, the guards took their chaplets and, not knowing what to do, put them on their heads like a crown. They were beatified on 13 June 1920. Their feast day is 26 June.

== Growth ==
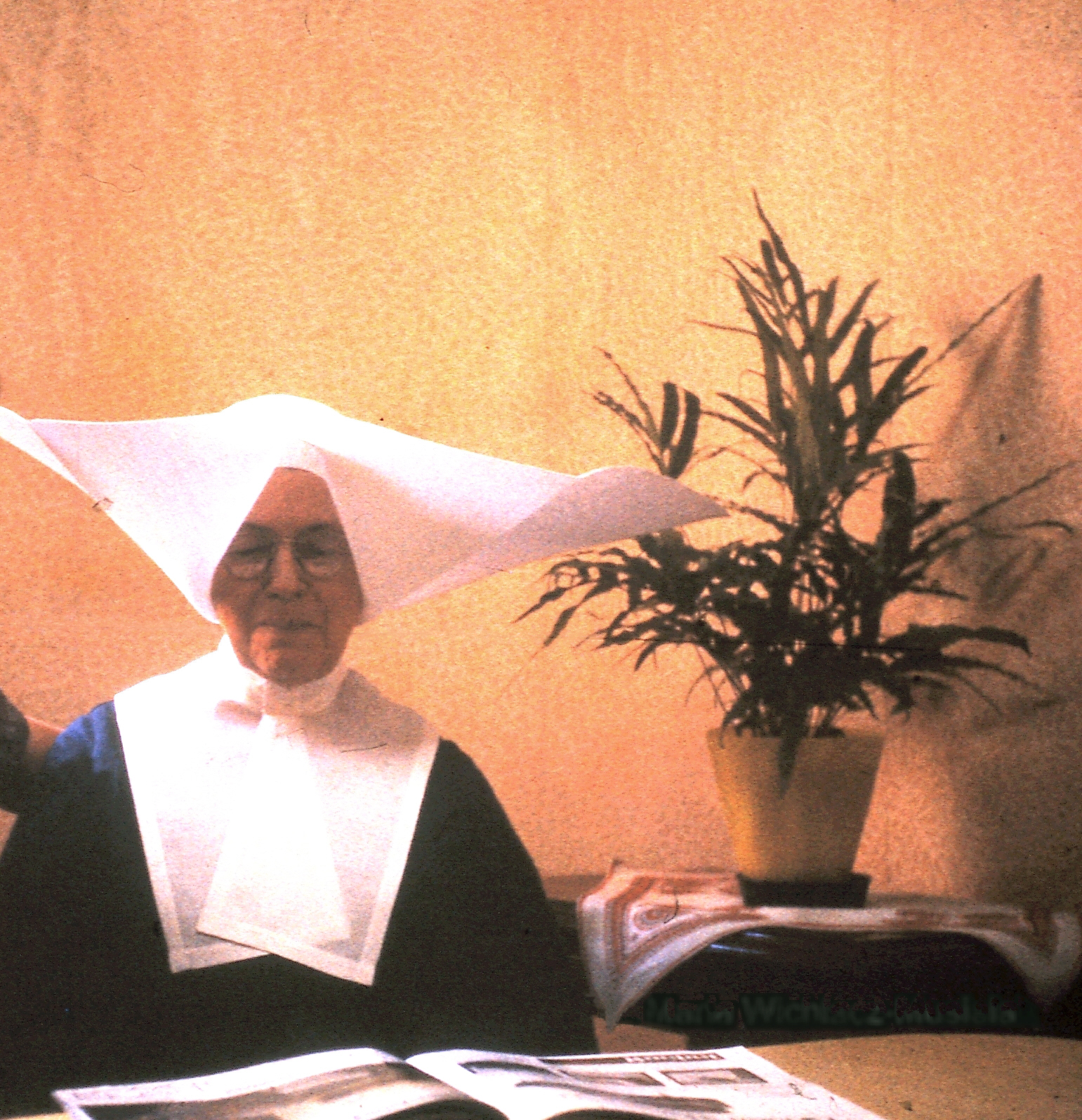
Until 1964, their traditional religious habit included a large, starched cornette on the head.

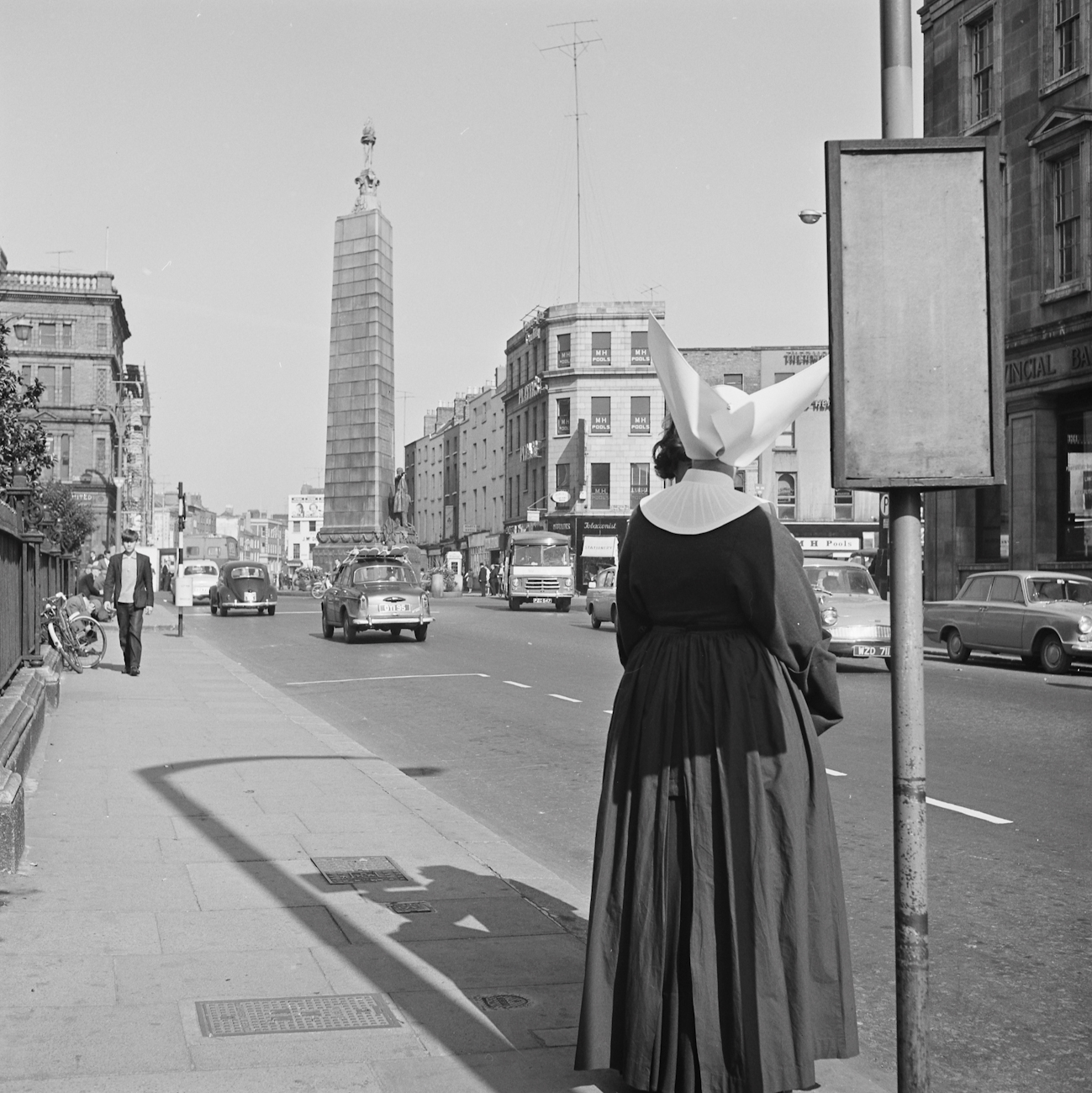
A Daughter of Charity shown with the distinctive headgear, Ireland, 1964

From that time and through the 19th century, the community spread to Austria, Australia, Hungary, Ireland, Israel, Portugal, Turkey, Britain and the Americas. During this period, the ministry of the Daughters developed to caring for others in need such as orphans and those with physical disabilities.

The first house in Ireland was opened in Drogheda, in 1855. By 1907 there were 46 houses and 407 sisters in England; 13 houses and 134 sisters in Ireland; 8 houses and 62 sisters in Scotland. They operated 23 orphanages; 7 industrial schools; 24 public elementary schools; 1 normal school to train teachers; 3 homes for working girls or women ex-convicts; and 8 hospitals.

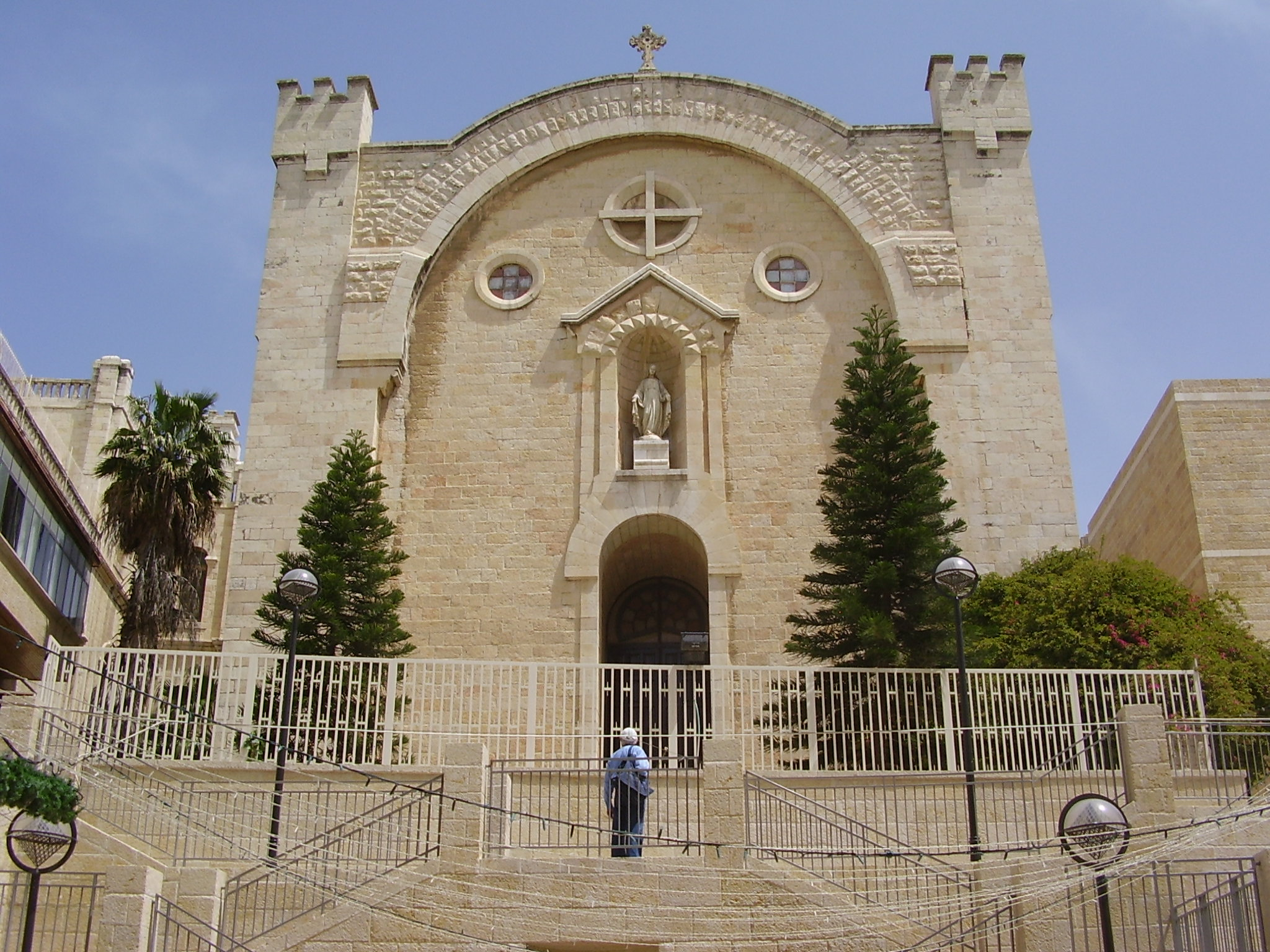
Convent of St. Vincent de Paul in Jerusalem

The Convent of Saint Vincent de Paul was the first building established on Mamilla Street in Jerusalem, near Jaffa Gate, in 1886. Precipitating the future growth of that street as a commercial thoroughfare, the sisters put up a series of shops in front of the building and used the rent money for convent operations. The convent was integrated into the design of the Mamilla Mall pedestrian promenade, which opened in 2007.

The motherhouse of the Daughters of Charity is located at 140 Rue du Bac, in Paris, France. The remains of de Marillac and those of St. Catherine Labouré lie preserved in the chapel of the motherhouse. Labouré was the Daughter of Charity to whom, in 1830, the Blessed Virgin Mary is said to have appeared, commissioning her to spread devotion to the Medal of Mary Immaculate, commonly called the Miraculous Medal.

The traditional habit of the Daughters of Charity was one of the most conspicuous of Catholic Sisters, as it included a large starched cornette on the head. This was the dress of peasant women of the neighborhood of Paris at the date of the foundation, a grey habit with wide sleeves and a long grey apron. The head-dress was at first a small linen cap, but to this was added in the early days the white linen cornette, from which they became affectionately known as "God's Geese". At first it was used only in the country, being in fact the headdress of the Île-de-France district, but in 1685 its use became general. The institute adopted a more simple modern dress and blue veil on 20 September 1964.

== Charism ==
The Charism of a religious society is the characteristic impetus which distinguishes it from other similar groups. Religious communities frequently describe it as a grace or gift given by God as inspiration to the founder, which lives on in the organization. The charism of the Daughters of Charity of St. Vincent de Paul is that of service to the poor.

== United States ==
See: Sisters of Charity Federation in the Vincentian-Setonian Tradition

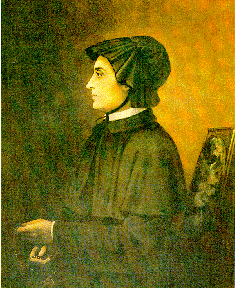
Saint Elizabeth Ann Seton (1774–1821)

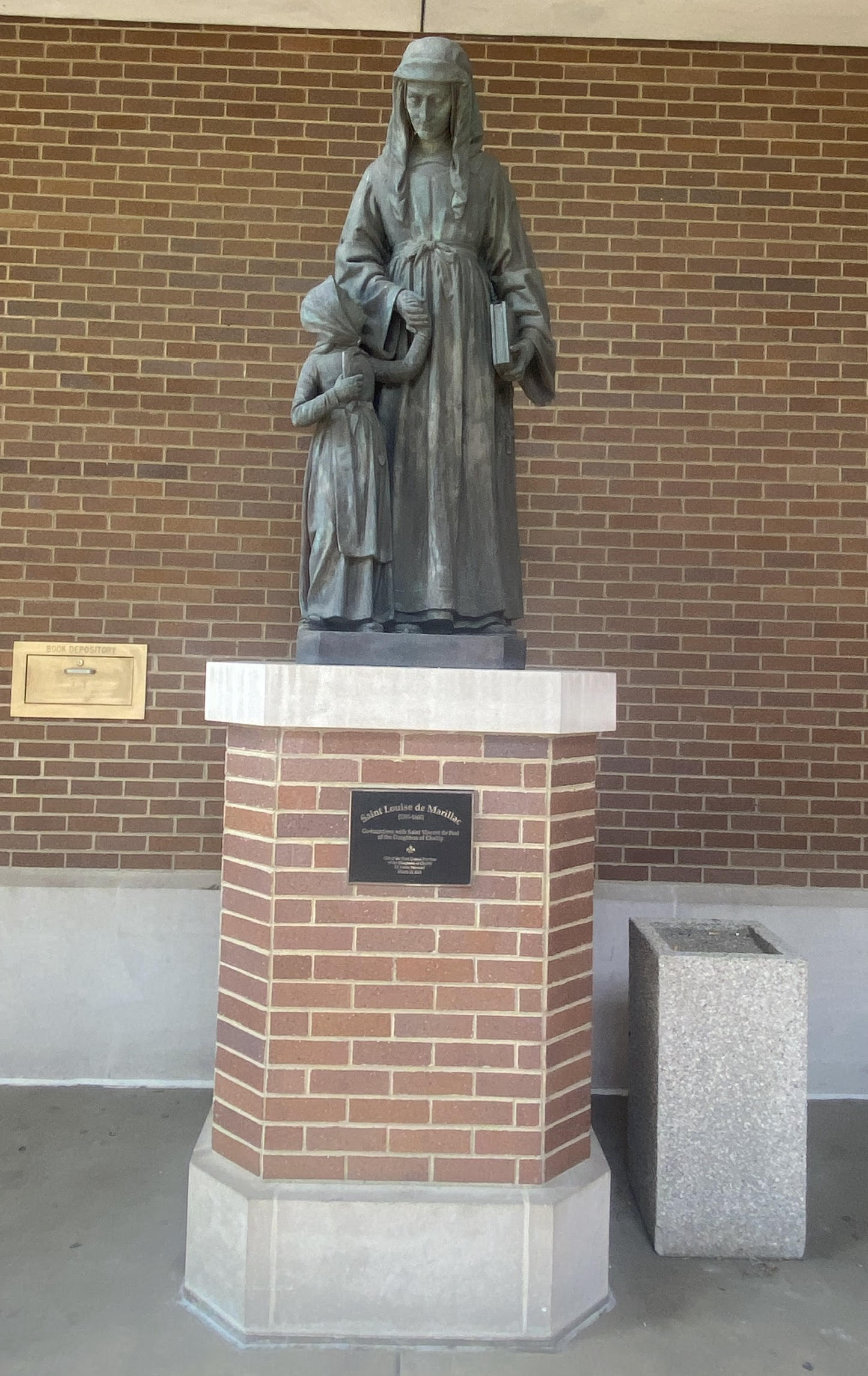
Louise de Marillac statue at DePaul University in Chicago.

In the United States, St. Elizabeth Ann Seton, a recent convert to the Catholic Church, had hoped to establish a community of Daughters of Charity. Unable to do so because of the political situation during the Napoleonic Wars, on 31 July 1809 she founded the Sisters of Charity of St. Joseph at Emmitsburg, Maryland. The nucleus of the little community consisted of five Sisters who were soon joined by others. Her desire to consecrate her life to works of charity led Mother Seton to request the Rules of the Daughters of Charity founded by St. Vincent de Paul in 1633. Bishop Benedict J. Flaget presented the request to superiors in Paris and in 1810 brought to Mother Seton the Rules by which she guided her community during her lifetime. At the time of her death in 1821, the community numbered fifty Sisters. In 1850, the community at Emmitsburg affiliated with the Mother House of the Daughters of Charity in Paris and at that time adopted the blue habit and the white collar and cornette. The community in Emmitsburg became the first American province of the Daughters of Charity.

By then, other communities had been established elsewhere in the United States. In 1817, Mother Seton sent three Sisters to New York at the invitation of Bishop Connolly to open a home for dependent children. Their services were urgently needed, for many parents were victims of the epidemics that frequently invaded the city, where there was as yet no system of sanitation. In 1846, the New York congregation incorporated as a separate order, the Sisters of Charity of New York. The Sisters in New York retained the rule, customs, and spiritual exercises originally established by Mother Seton: the black habit, cape and cap.

During the American Civil War, the congregation provided nursing services to soldiers in field hospitals and in depots for prisoners of war.

The Spanish–American War of 1898 quickly demonstrated the important need for trained nurses, as hastily constructed army camps for more than twenty-eight thousand members of the regular army were devastated by diarrhea, dysentery, typhoid fever, and malaria – all of which took a much greater toll than did enemy gunfire. The United States government called for women to volunteer as nurses. Thousands did so, but few were professionally trained. Among the latter were 250 Catholic nurses, most of them from the Daughters of Charity of St. Vincent de Paul. Reverend Mother Mariana Flynn, head of the Daughters of Charity, recalled their service during the Civil War and said her sisters were proud to be "back in the army again, caring for our sick and wounded."

In 1910, the jurisdiction of Emmitsburg was divided into two Provinces with the Eastern Provincial House in Emmitsburg and the Western Provincial House in Normandy, Missouri, a suburb of St. Louis.

== Contemporary status ==
As of 2019, 14,000 serve in ninety countries, addressing needs of food, water, sanitation and shelter, besides their work with health care, HIV/AIDS, migrant and refugee assistance, and education.

In July 2011 the Daughters of Charity merged four of the five existing U.S. provinces – Emmitsburg, Maryland; Albany, New York; St. Louis, Missouri; and Evansville, Indiana. The process of unification began at a 2007 gathering in Buffalo, New York. The Province of the West, based in Los Altos Hills, California, was not involved in the merger. The newly constituted province is named for St. Louise de Marillac, who founded the congregation in France in 1633 along with St. Vincent de Paul to "serve Christ in persons who are poor." Administrative offices for the Province of St. Louise are located in St. Louis, Missouri. The archival collections of the former provinces will be consolidated in a new facility located within the former St. Joseph's Provincial House, adjacent to The Basilica of the National Shrine of St. Elizabeth Ann Seton and the Seton Heritage Center, in Emmitsburg, Maryland. The new province covers 34 states, the District of Columbia and the Canadian province of Quebec.

In Spain, they have run orphanages, soup kitchens and hospitals. In recent times, they were accused of abusing power in maternity wards run by them both in private and public hospitals, stealing children from their mothers. A particular Sor Maria was accused and indicted but never fully judged or found guilty due to old age. This was denounced by Asociación Nacional de Afectados por Adopciones Irregulares (ANADIR).

== Activities ==
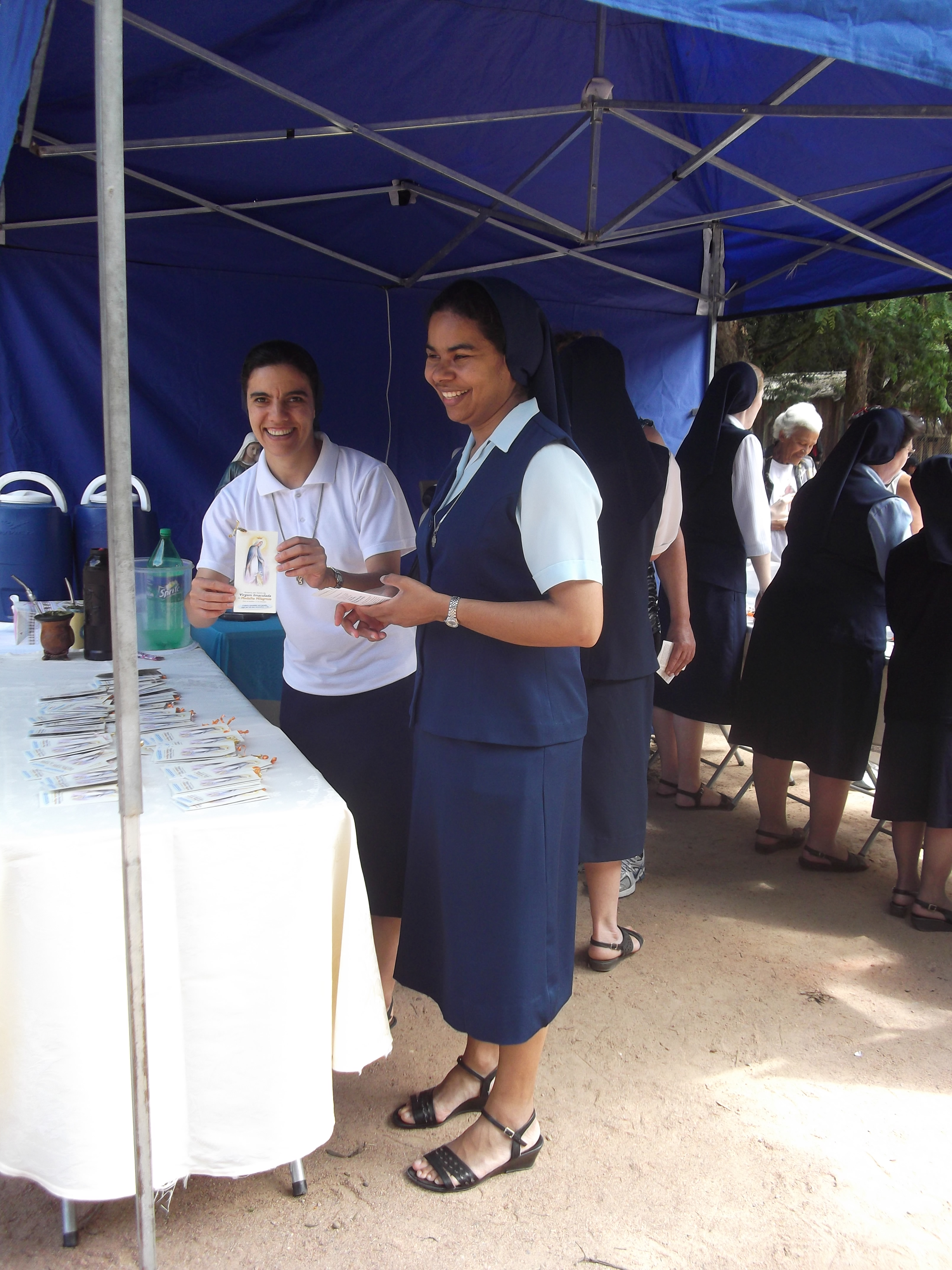
Vincentian Sisters in Brazil (2013)

Many hospitals, orphanages, and educational institutions were established and operated by the Daughters of Charity over the years, including Saint Joseph College, Emmitsburg, Maryland, Marillac College in Missouri, Santa Isabel College Manila, St Louise's Comprehensive College in Belfast, Northern Ireland, Sacred Heart College of Lucena City and Saint Louise de Marillac High School in Illinois. Though no longer staffed and run by the Daughters, five of the hospitals which were founded by them in the USA continue to operate within the St. Vincent's Health Care System.

Marillac St. Vincent Family Services in Chicago is a social service agency offering accredited early childhood education, programs for youth, comprehensive services to isolated seniors, access to food, and outreach to adults and families. The current nonprofit organization evolved from the merger of Marillac Social Center (est. 1914) and St. Vincent de Paul Center (est. 1915).

In Mayagüez, Puerto Rico, they help run the Asilo De Pobres and in the Philippines they run the College of the Immaculate Conception. When she became president due to the EDSA People Power Revolution, Cory Aquino bequeathed part of her shares in the juridical entity controlling the controversial Hacienda Luisita to the local registered entity of the charity.

In the United Kingdom, the Daughters of Charity are based at Mill Hill, north London, and have registered charity status.

Daughters operate St. Ann's Infant and Maternity Home near Washington, D.C.

== Saints, Blesseds, and other holy people ==
Saints

- Louise de Marillac (12 August 1591 – 15 March 1660), founder, canonized on 11 March 1934
- Vincent de Paul (24 April 1581 – 27 September 1660), cofounder, canonized on 16 June 1737
- Elizabeth Ann Seton (28 August 1774 - 4 January 1821), founder of the DC Sisters in the United States, canonized on 14 September 1975
- Catherine Labouré (2 May 1806 – 31 December 1876), Marian visionary, canonized on 27 July 1947

Blesseds

- Marie-Anne Vaillot (13 May 1736 - 1 February 1794), Martyr of the French Revolution (Diocese of Angers), beatified on 19 February 1984
- Odile Baumgarten (15 November 1750 - 1 February 1794), Martyr of the French Revolution (Diocese of Angers), beatified on 19 February 1984
- Marguerite Rutan (23 April 1736 - 9 April 1794), Martyr of the French Revolution, beatified on 19 June 2011
- Marie-Madelaine Fontaine (22 April 1723 - 26 June 1794), Martyr of the French Revolution (Diocese of Arras), beatified on 13 June 1920
- Marie-Francoise Lamel (24 August 1745 - 26 June 1794), Martyr of the French Revolution (Diocese of Arras), beatified on 13 June 1920
- Therese-Madelaine Fantou (29 July 1747 - 26 June 1794), Martyr of the French Revolution (Diocese of Arras), beatified on 13 June 1920
- Jeanne Gerard (23 October 1752 - 26 June 1794), Martyr of the French Revolution (Diocese of Arras), beatified on 13 June 1920
- Rosalie Rendu (9 September 1786 – 7 February 1856), who organized care for the poor in the Paris slums during the Industrial Revolution, beatified on 9 November 2003
- Marta Anna Wiecka (12 January 1874 - 30 May 1904), who worked throughout her life as a nurse in various hospitals in both Poland and Ukraine, beatified on 24 May 2008
- Giuseppina Nicoli (18 November 1863 – 31 December 1924), catechist, beatified on 3 February 2008
- Melchora Adoración Cortés Bueno, Josefa Martínez Pérez and 25 Companions (died 1936 and 1937), Martyrs of the Spanish Civil War, beatified on 13 October 2013
- Toribia Marticorena Sola and Dorinda Sotelo Rodríguez (died 23 October 1936), Martyrs of the Spanish Civil War, beatified on 11 November 2017
- Lindalva Justo de Oliveira (20 October 1953 - 9 April 1993), killed in defensum castitatis (in defense of chastity), beatified on 2 December 2007

Venerables

- Teresa Gabriella Borgarino (2 September 1880 - 1 January 1949), vowed member, declared Venerable on 20 January 2022
- Justa Domínguez de Vidaurreta Idoy (2 November 1875 - 18 December 1958), declared Venerable on 14 April 2018
- Maria Olga (Teresa) Tambelli (17 January 1884 - 23 February 1964), declared Venerable on 20 June 2025
- Pia (Anna) Cantalupo (3 September 1888 - 17 March 1983), declared Venerable on 22 June 2023
- Barbara (Stanisława) Samulowska (21 January 1865 - 6 December 1950), declared Venerable on 30 March 2026

Servants of God

- Marie-Anne (Eugenie) Pavillon and 9 Companions (died 20 June 1870), Martyrs of China
- Adèle-Louise-Marie de Mandat-Grancey (13 September 1837 - 31 May 1915)
- Francisca (Clemência) Benicia Oliveira (23 August 1896 - 6 July 1966)
- Marie-Isabelle-Renée (Cecilia) Charrin Deverchére (17 February 1890 - 13 July 1973)

Other prominent members

- Sister Bernadette Armiger, nursing administrator and mental health advocate
- Sister Marguerite Bernes, Algerian nun recognised as Righteous Among the Nations
- Sister Mary Flavia Egan, graduated from Georgetown 44 years before it officially admitted women
- Sister Ursula Mattingly
- Justina Hermina Pacek, a Slovenian nurse, photographer, painter, and illustrator; the first photographer among the Daughters of Charity
- Sister Asunción Ventura, Filipino nun who founded the first orphanage in the Philippines.
- Sister Justine Bisqueyburu, French visionary of the Green Scapular.
- Sister Apolline Andriveau, French visionary of the Red Scapular of the Passion.
- Sister María del Carmen Ortiz de Arce, Spanish educator of the blind.

== Axis collaboration ==
During World War II, two members of the order, including Sister Barta Pulherija, operated the Jastrebarsko children's camp on behalf of the Axis puppet state known as the Independent State of Croatia. Children arrived in an emaciated and weak condition from other camps within the Ustaše camp system, with a total of 3,336 children passing through Jastrebarsko. Between 449 and 1,500 children died at the camp, mainly from disease and malnutrition. Pulherija was the sister-in-law of Mile Budak, a senior Ustaše ideologist and high-ranking NDH official. The staff otherwise consisted of members of the Ustaše Youth and female Ustaše. Pulherija died in Austria in 1981.

== Child abuse inquiry in Scotland ==
The second phase of the Scottish Child Abuse Inquiry focused on orphanages run by the Daughters of Charity: Smyllum Park in Lanark (1864–1981), Bellevue House in Rutherglen (1912–1961), St Joseph's Hospital in Rosewell, St Vincent's School for the Deaf/Blind in Glasgow (1911–1985) and Roseangle Orphanage (St Vincent's) in Dundee (1905–1974). Smyllum Park was founded in 1864 and closed in 1981 due to a move from institutional establishments to small family group living for children in care. During its years of operation, it took in more than 11,600 children. "The Scottish Child Abuse Inquiry, which is investigating allegations of abuse against children in care across Scotland, heard from former residents at the Smyllum Park home, who described suffering beatings, sexual and emotional abuse and mistreatment." When opened, the aim was to support homeless Catholic children from Scotland. Bodies of up to 400 children who had died at Smyllum were discovered in a single nearby mass grave.

In 2018 the Scottish Child Abuse Inquiry reported that there had been physical, sexual, and emotional abuse at Scottish orphanages run by the Daughters at Smyllum Park (closed in 1981) and Bellevue House (closed in 1961). Lawyers representing the Daughters of Charity of St Vincent de Paul at the Scottish Child Abuse inquiry officially apologised to people who had been abused as children in the care of the Charity. Peter Kearney, director of the Scottish Catholic Media Office, said "During the 60-year period the inquiry covered, over 400,000 children experienced residential care in Scotland, the vast majority in non-Catholic homes. Catholics represent only 16 percent of Scotland's population, and Catholic religious orders didn't supply most residential care in the past. That was provided by local authorities. Putting Catholic religious orders at the top of the inquiry's agenda has thus created a skewed perspective."

In 2023, two nuns and a carer were found guilty of abusing children at Smyllum Park. In 2025 the Daughters of Charity agreed to pay up to £10 million to those who had been abused as children at the orphanages in Scotland.

== See also ==
- Institute of Consecrated Life
- Religious institute (Catholic)
- Secular institute
- Sisters of Charity of New York
- Vocational Discernment in the Catholic Church
