= Basilica Shrine of Our Lady of the Miraculous Medal =

Coordinates: 40.0421°N 75.1677°W

The Basilica Shrine of Our Lady of the Miraculous Medal
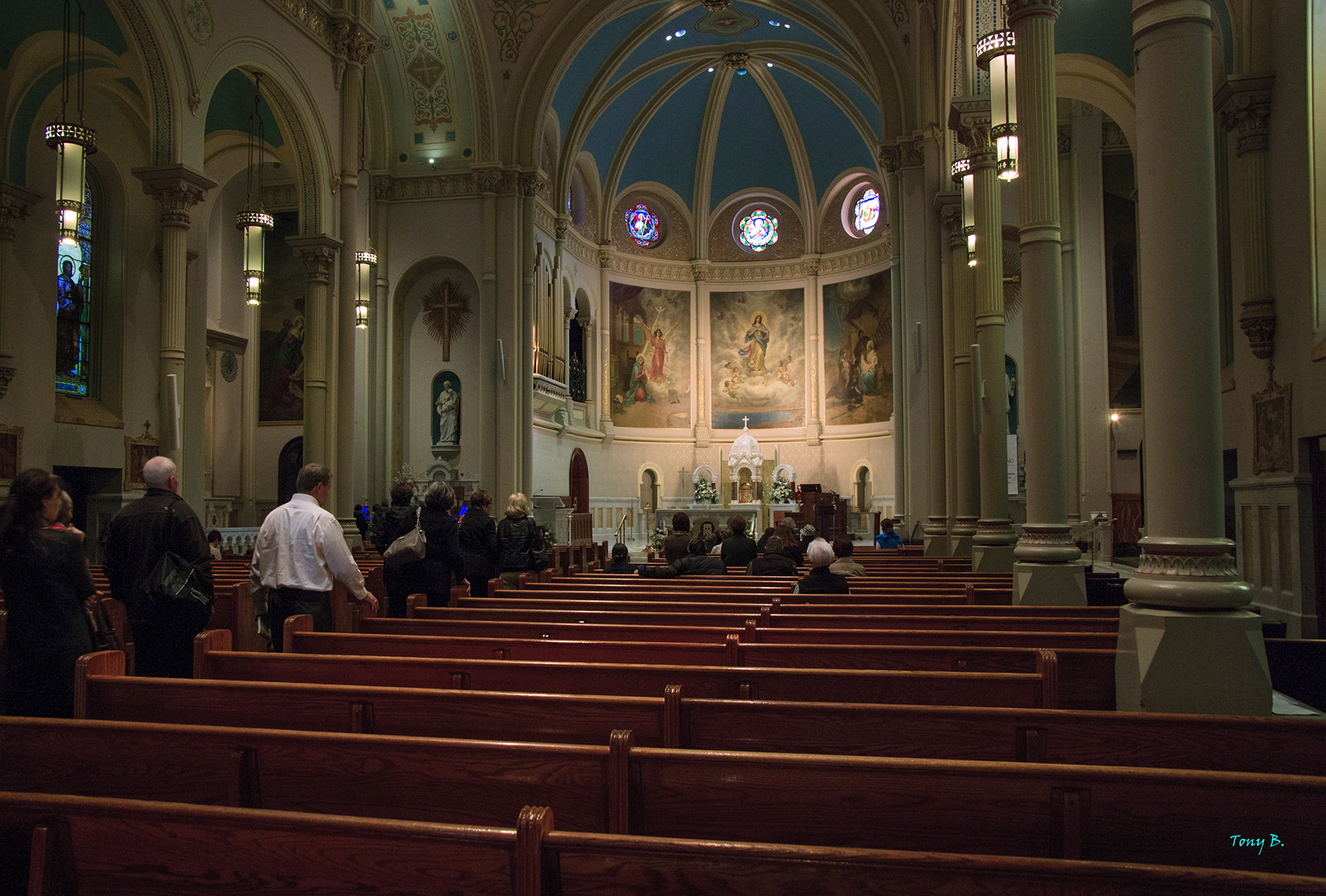
- The Basilica Shrine in 2016
- The Basilica Shrine of Our Lady of the Miraculous Medal
- Location: 500 E. Chelten Ave; Philadelphia, Pennsylvania
- Country: United States
- Denomination: Roman Catholic
- Website: www.miraculousmedal.org

History
- Status: Minor Basilica
- Founder(s): The Congregation of the Mission of St. Vincent de Paul, Eastern Province, USA

Architecture
- Functional status: Active
- Groundbreaking: 1875
- Completed: 1879

Clergy
- Rector: Fr. John Kettelberger, CM

The Basilica Shrine of Our Lady of the Miraculous Medal, formerly known as The Miraculous Medal Shrine, is at 500 E. Chelten Ave., in the East Germantown neighborhood of Philadelphia, Pennsylvania. The church now known as the Basilica Shrine was completed by the Congregation of the Mission in 1879 as the Chapel of the Immaculate Conception on the grounds of St. Vincent's Seminary. In 1927, Fr. Joseph Skelly, CM, commissioned the creation of Mary's Central Shrine within the chapel to promote devotion to Our Lady of the Miraculous Medal, a title of the Virgin Mary originating with her apparitions to St. Catherine Labouré in Paris in 1830. Mary's Central Shrine, also known as the Main Mary Shrine, was dedicated on September 8,1927, by His Eminence, the late Dennis Cardinal Dougherty.

On January 25, 2023, the Central Association of the Miraculous Medal (CAMM) announced that the Vatican's Dicastery for Divine Worship and the Discipline of the Sacraments had issued a decree dated Dec. 12, 2022, granting The Miraculous Medal Shrine (jointly the Chapel of the Immaculate Conception and Mary's Central Shrine within it), the title minor basilica. This precipitated the renaming of the church to The Basilica Shrine of Our Lady of the Miraculous Medal. The Basilica Shrine thus became the second minor basilica in the Archdiocese of Philadelphia after the Cathedral Basilica of Saints Peter and Paul and the 92nd minor basilica in the United States.

== Founding ==
In 1868, the Congregation of the Mission relocated the novitiate and scholasticate of its American Province from St. Louis, Missouri, to Philadelphia where they would establish St. Vincent's Seminary on the eastern edge of the historic borough of Germantown, six miles north of the Philadelphia city center. (Germantown would later become part of a geographically expanded Philadelphia in the Act of Consolidation, 1854.) The Vincentians planned to build a chapel on the grounds of the seminary to serve Vincentian priests, brothers, and seminarians. Archbishop James Frederick Wood of the Archdiocese of Philadelphia requested that the plans be modified so that the chapel would also serve the working class immigrants in the area who did not have a parish church at the time. This chapel was opened to the public in 1879.

== Creation of Mary's Central Shrine ==
In 1927, Fr. Joseph Skelly, CM, expanded the chapel to create a shrine to our Our Lady of the Miraculous Medal. The focal point of the shrine is a large sculpture of Carrara marble depicting the Blessed Mother extending her arms as she did in her second apparition to St. Catherine Labouré on November 27, 1830.

== Perpetual Novena ==
For almost 100 years, the Miraculous Medal Perpetual Novena has been prayed every Monday at The Basilica Shrine of Our Lady of the Miraculous Medal, in Philadelphia, Pennsylvania. What began on December 8, 1930 with Fr. Joseph Skelly, CM, has become an unbroken tradition where thousands of people around the world join in prayer each week through the 12:05 p.m. (US) livestream on YouTube.

== Fr. Joseph Skelly, CM, Madonna Art Museum ==
Home to more than 250 pieces of Marian and religious art from around the world, the museum invites devotees of Mary and art lovers alike to explore one of the largest Marian art collections in a single location.

== St. Vincent's Rosary Walk ==
St. Vincent’s Rosary Walk was dedicated on May 1, 2023, and inspired by devotion to Our Lady and the cherished tradition of praying the Rosary. It includes two gardens: the Meditation Garden for prayer, solitude, and reflection, and the Children's Marian Garden, which was created to encourage young Catholics and Marian devotees to learn the Rosary and appreciate Mary’s story.

== Quarterly Anointing of the Sick Masses ==
Four quarterly Anointing of the Sick Masses are offered annually.

== Importance to immigrant communities ==
The Vincentians have had a long history of serving the immigrant community in Philadelphia. They originally came to the city in 1841 at the request of Bishop Francis Kenrick, who asked them to administer and serve as faculty at the new seminary he founded, which is known today as St. Charles Borromeo Seminary. At the time, the Catholic population of the diocese was about 100,000 and growing rapidly largely due to immigration of European Catholic families to the city. Yet there were only 38 priests to serve them. In the ensuing years, the Vincentians traveled throughout the Philadelphia area and New Jersey serving as parish priests. In 1849, again at the request of Bishop Kenrick, they established St. Vincent de Paul Parish in Germantown to serve the growing number of Irish-Catholic immigrants in the area, many of whom had fled hunger and religious persecution in their home country. Later, the Vincentians would found local churches to serve Italian-American immigrants and African-Americans who came to the city in the Great Migration. In recent years, the Basilica Shrine has collaborated with various ethnic and cultural communities around Philadelphia to install devotional shrines in the lower chapel of the Basilica Shrine and on the grounds of the Basilica Shrine:

- Our Lady of Guadalupe, in recognition of those with Latino heritage.
- Our Lady of Knock, in recognition of those with Irish heritage.
- Our Lady of Piat, which the shrine spells Our Lady of FIAT to coincide with the acronym for "Filipinos in America Today," in recognition of those with Filipino heritage.
- Our Lady of La Leche, in recognition of those with Hispanic heritage as well as mothers who are expecting to give birth or nursing.
- Our Lady of Kibeho, which commemorates the Marian apparitions to three young women in Kibeho, Rwanda, beginning in 1981. These apparitions were the first and only Marian apparitions in Africa recognized by the Catholic Church and approved by the Vatican.
- Our Lady of Vailankanni, in recognition of those with Indian heritage.

In addition, each year The Basilica Shrine, in collaboration with the St. Thomas Syro-Malabar Forane Catholic Church in the Northeast section of Philadelphia, hosts a Holy Mass in the Syro Malabar Rite and a rosary procession on the feast day of Our Lady of Vailankanni, a Marian title originating with apparitions of the Blessed Mother in India in the 16th and 17th centuries. A statue of Our Lady of Vailankanni is permanently displayed in the lower chapel and moved to the main church for feast day services.

The lower chapel also contains the Shrine of Our Lady of the Globe, a depiction of the Blessed Mother as she appeared in her second apparition to St. Catherine later on November 27, 1830.
