= Chapel of Our Lady of the Miraculous Medal =

Catholic shrine in Paris, France

Coordinates: 48.850974°N 2.323770°E

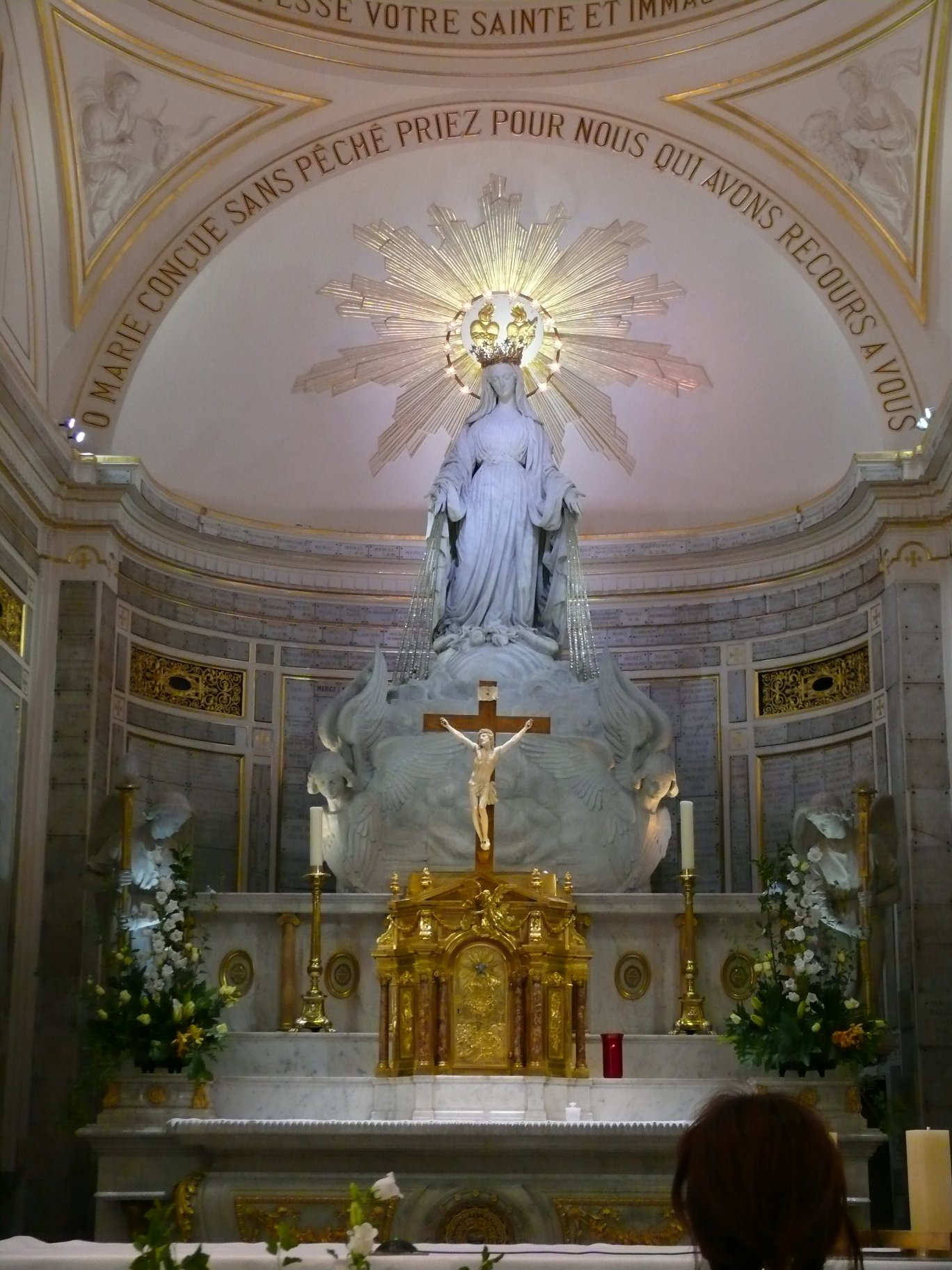
The famed tabernacle, ivory crucifix and statue of the chapel, crowned by the decree of Pope Leo XIII on 2 March 1897

The Chapel of Graces of the Miraculous Virgin (French: La Chapelle du Grâce de Sainte Vierge Miraculeuse) or informally the Chapel of Our Lady of the Miraculous Medal, is a Roman Catholic Marian shrine located in Paris, France. It is dedicated to the Blessed Virgin Mary under the Marian title the Virgin of Miracles.

The venerated Marian image enshrined within merited a decree of Pontifical coronation from Pope Leo XIII in 1897 as well as an Apostolic Visit from Pope John Paul II on 31 May 1980.

== History ==
Originally constructed via the imperial decree of King Louis XVIII on 25 March 1813, the chapel was formerly within the former building of the Hotel de Châtillon. It was blessed and dedicated to the Sacred Heart of Jesus on 6 August 1815 and served as a part of the motherhouse of the Order of the Daughters of Charity of Saint Vincent de Paul.

The famed address of the shrine is 140, Rue du Bac, Paris. The chapel is reputed to be where the Blessed Virgin Mary purported apparition to the novice of the Daughters of Charity, Catherine Labouré, in December 1830, and to have requested the creation of the medallion of the Immaculate Conception in 1832 via the ecclesiastical approbation of the former Archbishop of Paris, Hyacinth Louis de Quelen. This sacramental became piously known by popular demand as the Miraculous Medal.

== Pontifical coronation ==
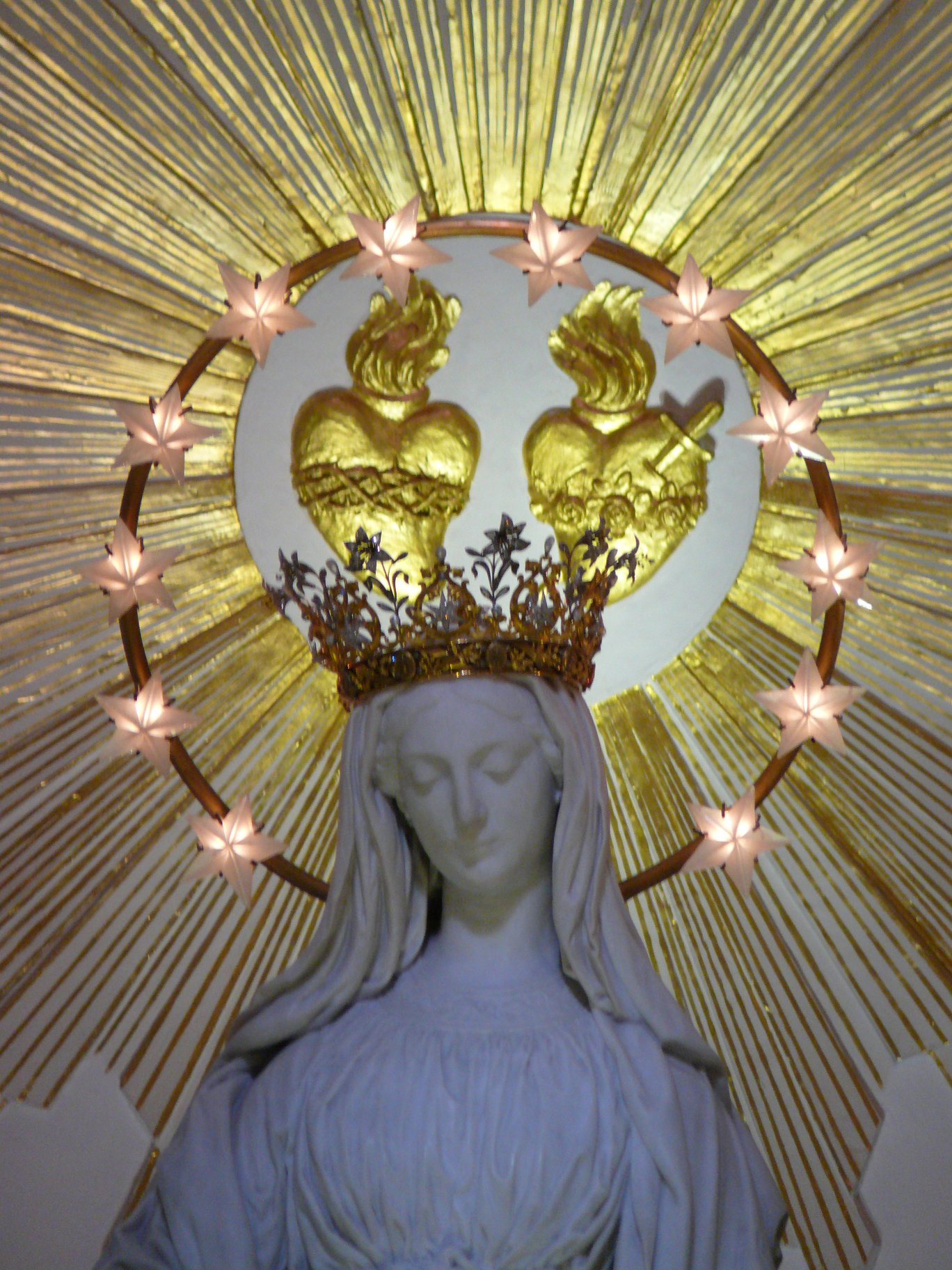
Pontifical crown of Pope Leo XIII decreed to the Marian image manufactured by French jeweler and artisan, Frédérick Prudence Boucheron (1830–1902)

Pope Leo XIII granted the Marian image enshrined within the chapel a Pontifical decree of coronation on 2 March 1897. The rite of coronation was executed by the former Archbishop of Paris, Cardinal François-Marie-Benjamin Richard on 26 July 1897.

Pope Pius XII granted a decree of coronation for an image of Our Lady of the Miraculous Medal venerated in the Church of Saint Matthew in Maastricht, Netherlands on 15 March 1956 which later took place on 27 May of the same year.

== Marian apparitions ==
The chapel at Rue du Bac, Paris, is the site of a number of apparitions said to have been experienced by Catherine Labouré. It was here on three successive days, while praying, that Saint Vincent de Paul showed her his heart three times in a different colour:

- White — the colour of peace
- Red — the colour of fire
- Black — an indication of the misfortunes on the city of Paris.

Shortly after, Labouré saw Christ present in the Sacred Host, and on 6 June 1830, the Feast of the Holy Trinity, Christ appeared as a crucified king, stripped of all his adornments.

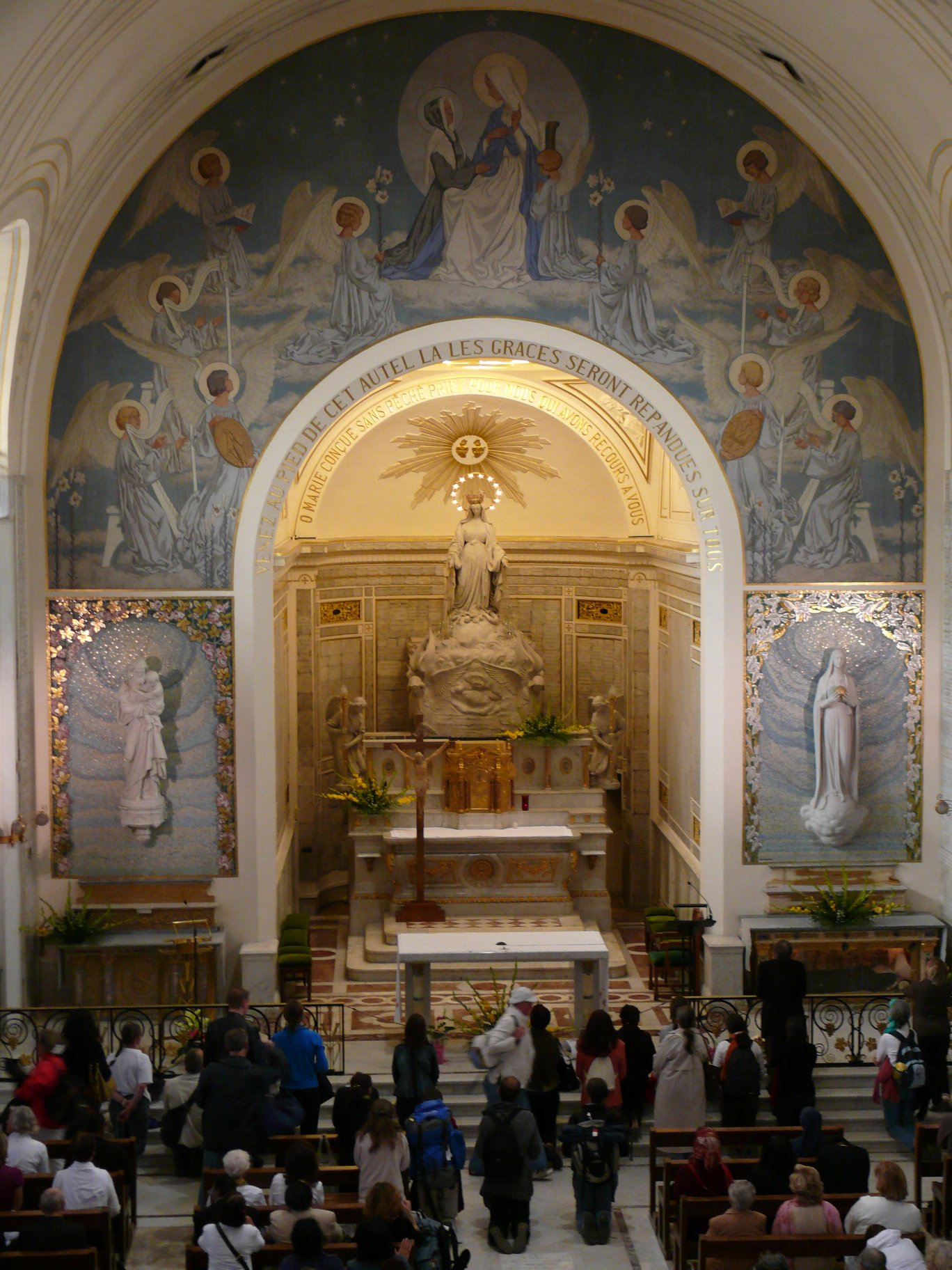
The interior of the chapel. The altar recalls the purported apparition of the Blessed Virgin Mary seen levitating above the tabernacle

In 1830, Labouré (aged 24) received three visits from the Blessed Virgin Mary. On the first visit, the night of 18 July, she received a request that a Confraternity of the Children of Mary be established. Accordingly, the Virgin Mary later requested the creation of a medal with the following invocation:

Latin: “O Maria Sine Labe Concepta, Ora Pro Nobis qui Confugimus ad Te.
English: "O Mary, conceived without sin, pray for us who have recourse to thee."

In 1832, a cholera epidemic swept Paris and the religious nuns disseminated the medal called the Medal of the Immaculate Conception. As the epidemic receded and fewer people were infected, and Parisians began to call the medal "miraculous." In 1849, the chapel was expanded and thereafter other modifications were executed. Since 1930, the date of its complete renovation, the chapel has remained as it is known today.

The French artisan and jeweler Frederick Prudence Boucheron was designated by the former Count of Paris, Prince Jean, Duke of Guise to design and manufacture the Pontifical crown for the image, to which Boucheron also had a pious fanaticism to the purported Marian apparition coinciding to his own birth year in 1830. A sterling silver medallion (created by Adrienne Vachette) which he personally wore remains preserved from his deathbed in 1902. Another crown belonging to the venerated statuary image of Notre dame de Paris of the Blessed Virgin was manufactured in 1929 by the House of Boucheron.

The venerated statue crowned by Pope Leo XIII in 1897 helped establish the image and spread its devotion. In many Catholic countries, the image retained its original title as Virgin of Miracles (Spanish: Virgen Milagrosa) while the title Our Lady of Grace was popularized in the United States of America during the 1940s and 1950s due to her iconographic hand gesture.

The former American actress Grace Kelly also had a Marian devotion to Our Lady of the Miraculous Medal, notably due to her early childhood upbringing as an Irish Catholic, named after Saint Patrick of Ireland and later becoming the future Princess of Monaco in 1956. The Marian image would later be featured in the French—American film An Affair to Remember (1957) starring Cary Grant, wherein the image is enshrined within the chapel of his grandmother.

== Custodianship ==
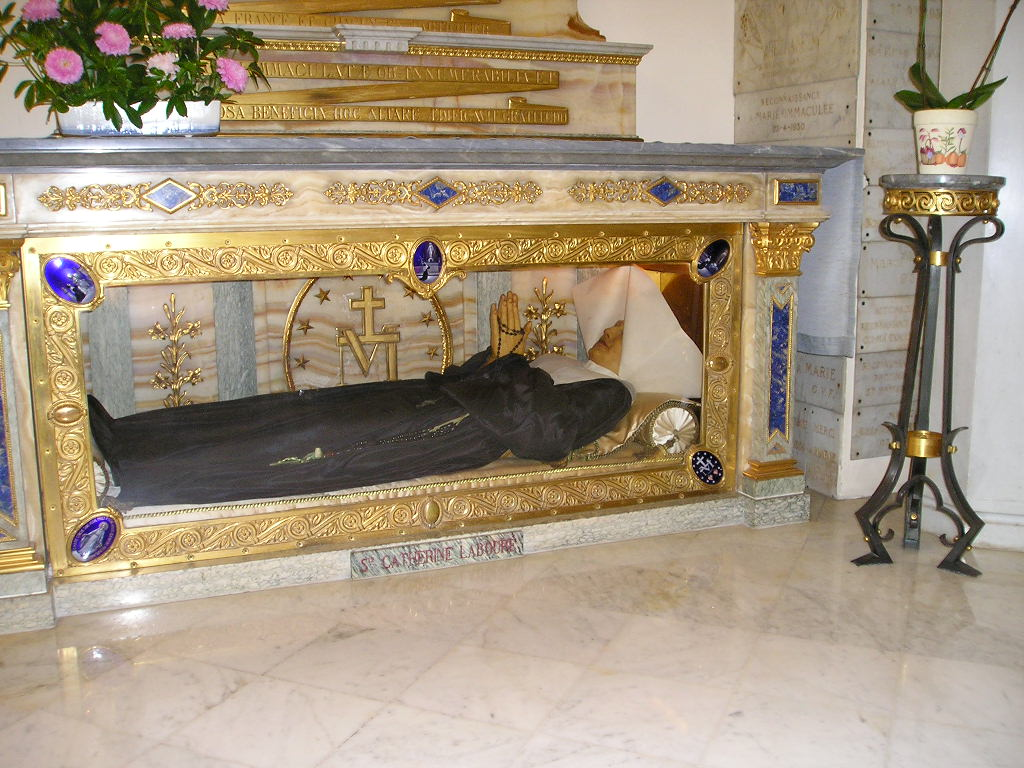
Tomb with the incorrupt body of Catherine Labouré.

The chapel is administered by the Company of the Daughters of Charity of Saint Vincent de Paul. Only the 17th-century tabernacle remains unchanged since 1815. This tabernacle came from the original building allocated in 1800 to the Daughters of Charity. Once lost, it was rediscovered in the chapel of the Sisters of Mercy and was installed there before the French Revolution.

Catherine Labouré declared that it was in front of the tabernacle that the Blessed Virgin Mary prostrated herself in the nights of 18 and 19 July 1830 and that she was above it during the third apparition in December 1830. In 1850, an ivory crucifix was placed on top of this tabernacle.

== Catholic Church ==
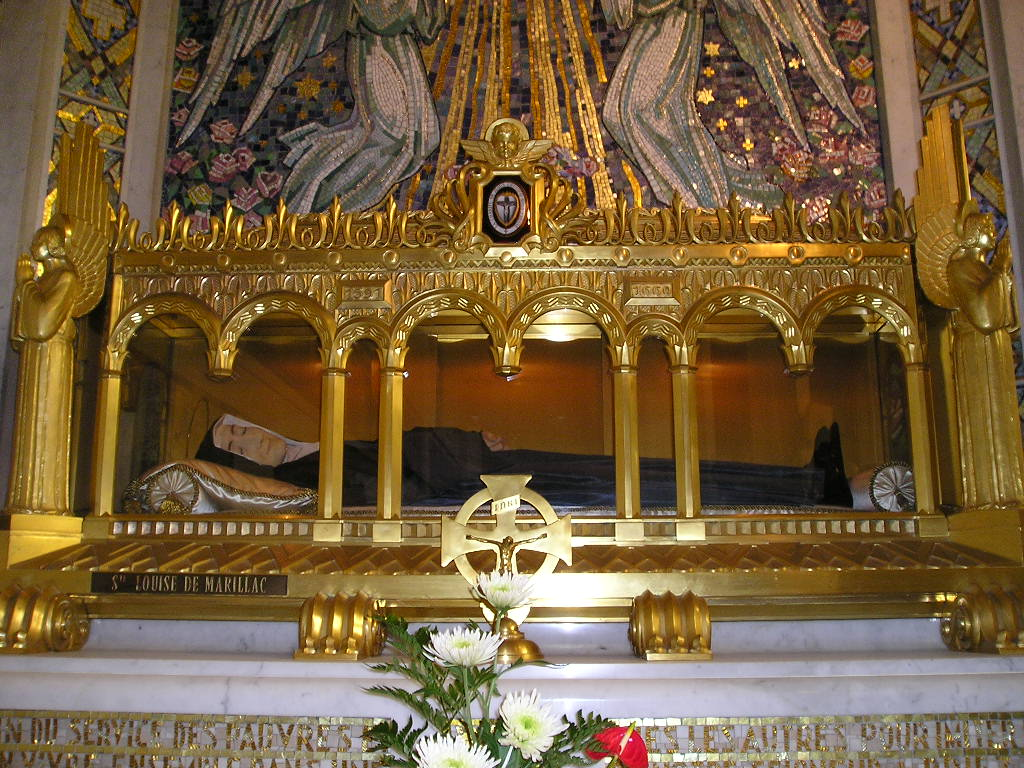
Tomb with the effigy of Louise de Marillac.

The chapel, as a site of Marian apparition, is a Marian shrine and hence a site of Catholic pilgrimage. It can hold as many as 700 visitors.

The wax effigy containing the bones of Louise de Marillac and the heart of Vincent de Paul, founders of the Daughters of Charity of Saint Vincent de Paul, are kept there. The incorrupt body of Catherine Labouré, member of the Daughters of Charity of Saint Vincent de Paul and famous Marian visionary, also lies in a glass coffin at the side altar of the chapel.

== See also ==
- St. Mary's of the Barrens Catholic Church (Perryville, Missouri) - National Shrine of Our Lady of the Miraculous Medal.
- Basilica Shrine of Our Lady of the Miraculous Medal, Philadelphia
