= Miraculous Medal =

Roman Catholic devotional medal

Coordinates: 48.850974°N 2.323770°E

Our Lady of the Miraculous Medal
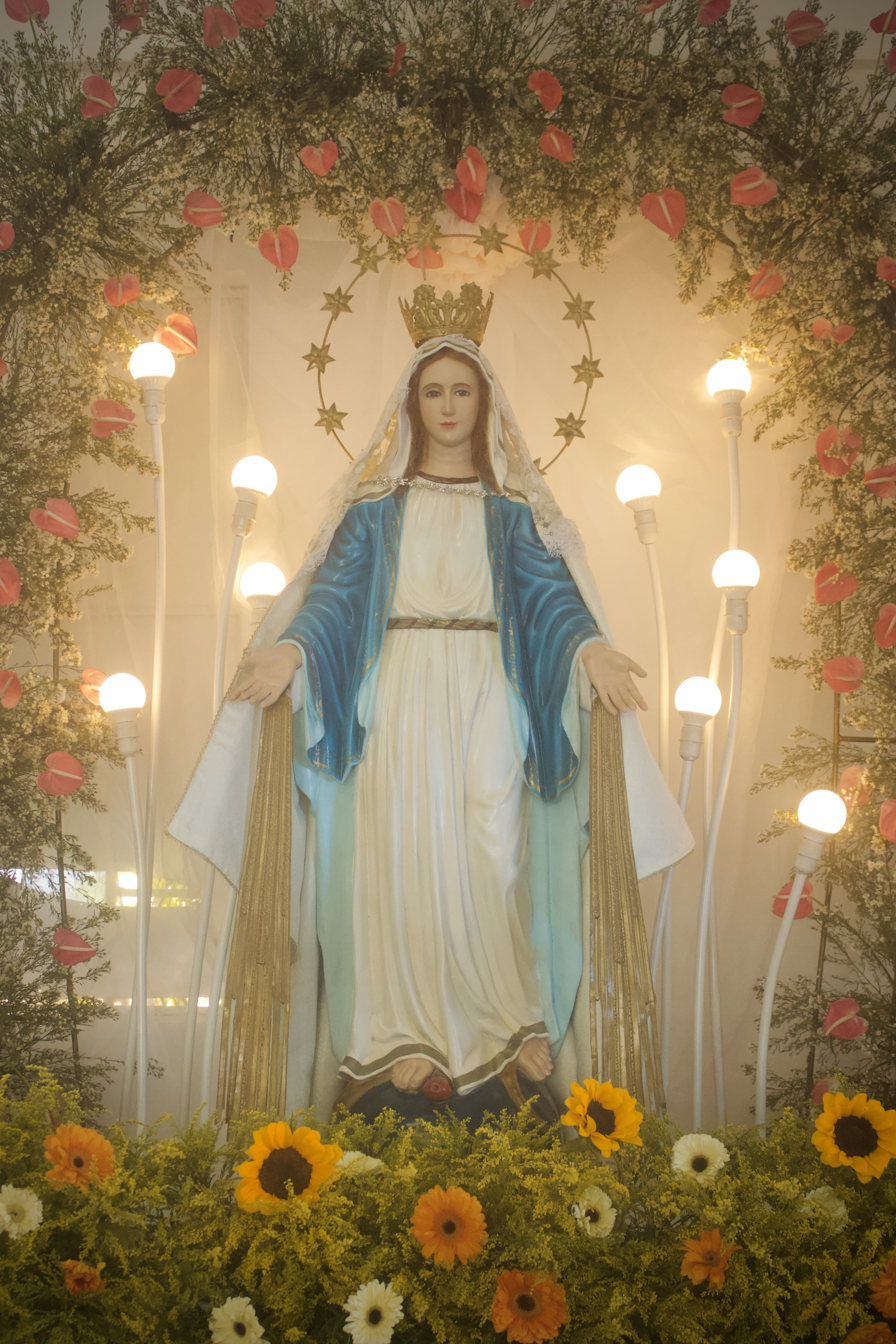
- Statue in the Philippines depicting Our Lady of the Miraculous Medal (Our Lady of Graces)
- Location: Rue du Bac in Paris, France
- Date: 18 July 1830; 27 November 1830
- Witness: Saint Catherine Labouré
- Type: Marian apparition
- Approval: 1836 (Archbishop Hyacinthe-Louis de Quélen, Archdiocese of Paris)
- Venerated in: Catholic Church
- Shrine: Chapel of Our Lady of the Miraculous Medal, Paris, France
- Patronage: Special graces, miracles of healing, conversions, believers

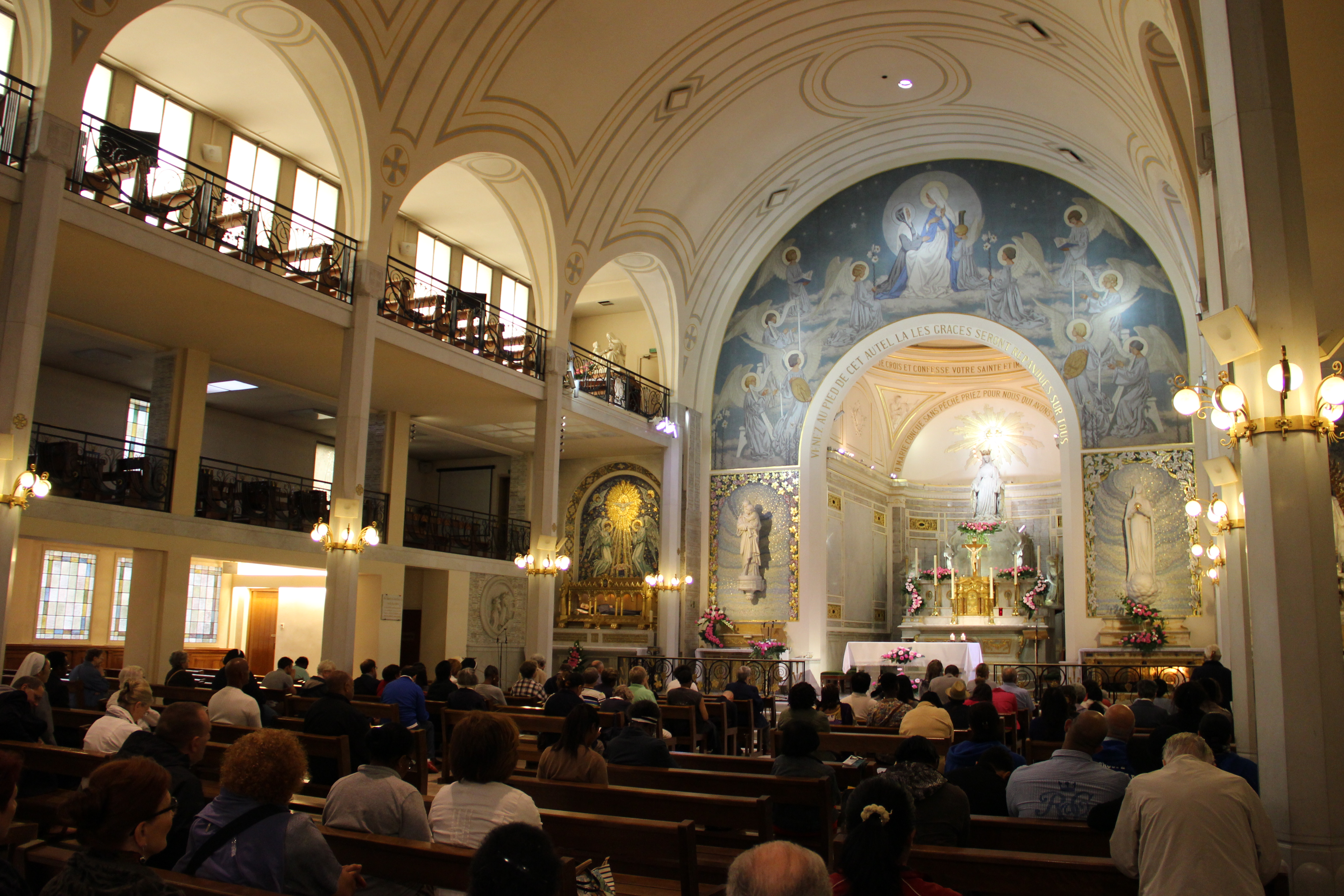
The Chapel of Our Lady of the Miraculous Medal is located in Rue du Bac, Paris

The Miraculous Medal (French: Médaille miraculeuse), also given the names the Medal of Our Lady of Graces or the Medal of the Immaculate Conception, is a devotional medal originated by Catherine Labouré following apparitions of the Virgin Mary in the Chapel of Our Lady of the Miraculous Medal of Paris, France.

The medal, a sacramental, was made by the goldsmith Adrien Vachette. According to the teaching of the Roman Catholic Church, sacramentals, by the Church's prayer, prepare the faithful to receive grace and dispose them to cooperate with it. A prayer of petition to Mother Mary is engraved upon the front of the medal, reading "O Mary, conceived without sin, pray for us who have recourse to thee".

== Background ==
Catherine Labouré stated that on July 18, 1830, the eve of the feast of Saint Vincent de Paul, she woke up after hearing the voice of a child calling and leading her to the chapel of her convent. There, the Virgin Mary appeared to her and said that "God wishes to charge you with a mission [...] You will be contradicted, but do not fear, you will have grace [...] Tell your spiritual director all that passes within you [...] Times are evil. Sorrows will come upon France [...] The whole world will be upset by miseries of every kind."

On November 27, 1830, Catherine then observed that the Virgin Mary returned during her evening meditations, displaying herself inside an oval frame, standing upon a globe. She wore many rings set with gems that shone rays of light over the globe. Mary said to her that the rays symbolized the graces she is "shedding upon those who ask for them", and that the gems which did not shed light "are the graces for which souls forget to ask". Around the margin of the frame appeared a prayer of petition: Ô Marie, conçue sans péché, priez pour nous qui avons recours à vous ("O Mary, conceived without sin, pray for us who have recourse to thee"). As Catherine watched, the frame seemed to rotate, showing a circle of twelve stars, a large letter 'M' surmounted by a cross, and the stylized Sacred Heart of Jesus crowned with thorns and the Immaculate Heart of Mary pierced with a sword. Catherine heard the Virgin Mary ask her to "have a Medal struck after this model" and to take these images to her confessor, and that "all who wear them will receive great graces".

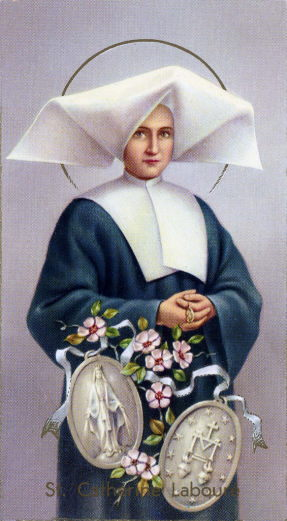
Saint Catherine Labouré

After two years of investigation and observation of Catherine's ordinary daily behavior, her priest took the information to the archbishop of Paris, Hyacinthe-Louis de Quélen. The request was approved, and the medal was designed from her visionary descriptions, and eventually produced through the labor of the goldsmith Adrien Vachette. The first 1,500 medals, originally called the "Medal of the Immaculate Conception", were minted on June 30, 1832.

During a deadly cholera pandemic, the Daughters of Charity started distributing the medals. After reports of miraculous cures, the demand for the medal rapidly grew in France and other graces were reported, such as conversions, and it became widely known in the following decades as the Miraculous Medal. In 1834, over 500,000 medals had been distributed. By 1835, that number had surpassed 1 million worldwide. By 1839, over 10 million medals had been distributed. And by the time of Catherine Labouré's death in 1876, more than 1 billion Miraculous Medals had been produced.

The Chapel of Our Lady of the Miraculous Medal, in which Catherine experienced her visions, is located at the mother house of the Daughters of Charity of Saint Vincent de Paul in rue du Bac, Paris. The incorrupt bodies of Saint Catherine Labouré and Saint Louise de Marillac, a co-founder of the Congregation of the Daughters of Charity of Saint Vincent de Paul, are interred in the chapel.

== Symbolism ==
The elements of the emblem upon the sides of the Miraculous Medal encapsulate major Marian teachings that have since been declared doctrine by the Catholic Church.

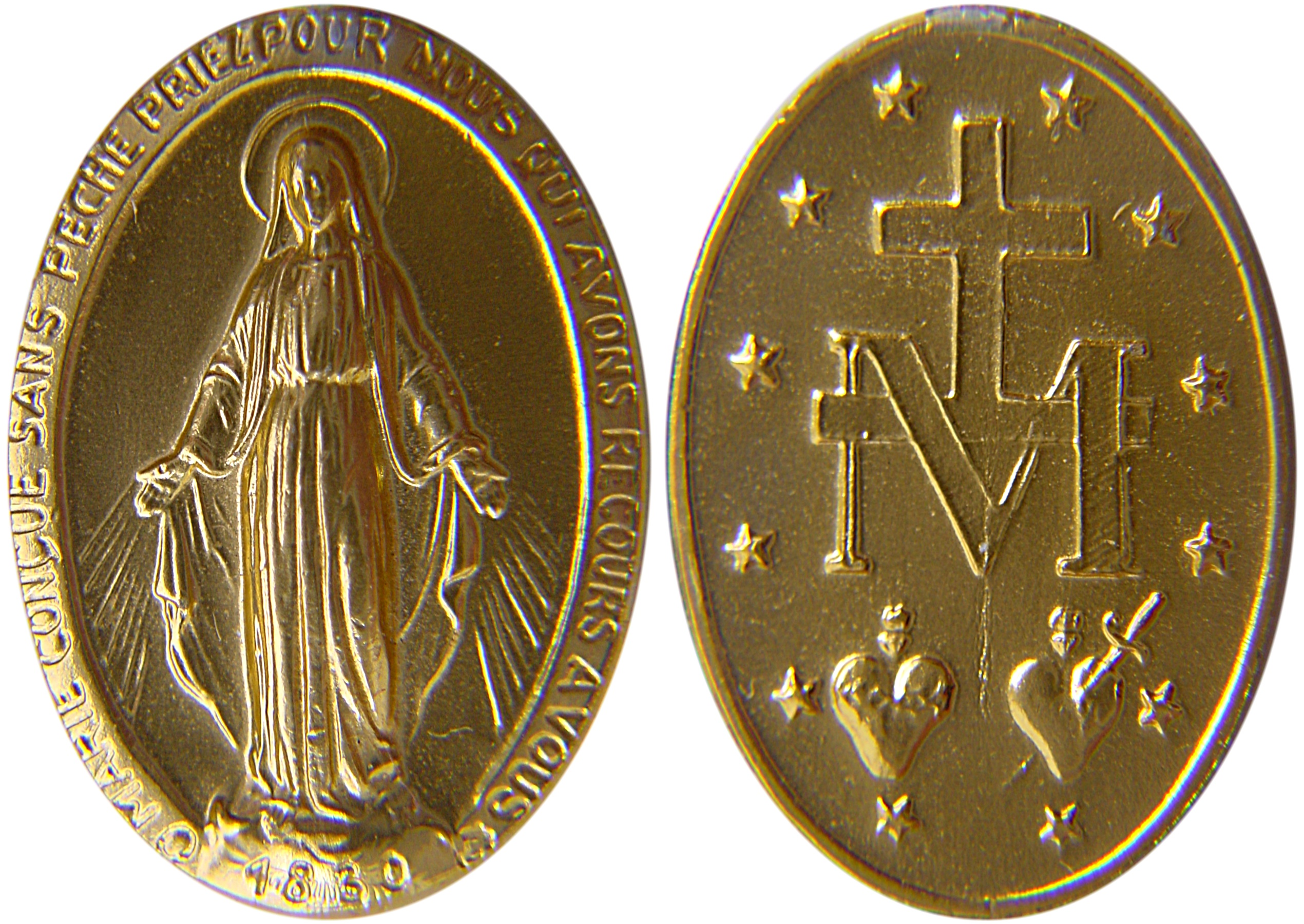
The Miraculous Medal design was executed by Adrien Vachette based on Saint Catherine Labouré's visions

Front:

- Mary stands on a globe – Mary bestowing graces upon the Earth and mankind, assumed into Heaven, describing the original vision, Catherine said Mary appeared radiant as a sunrise, "in all her perfect beauty"
- Crushes the serpent's head underfoot – reference to Genesis 3:15, Mary is engaged in the spiritual battle against evil and Satan (serpent), she protects from evil
- Rays of light shine forth from Mary's hands and rings – symbolizing graces from Mary as a Mediatrix, Mary told Catherine that the rays "symbolize the graces I shed upon those who ask for them"
- Words from the vision, originally in French, form an oval frame around the image: "O Mary, conceived without sin, pray for us who have recourse to thee" – the Immaculate Conception of the Virgin Mary
- 1830 is marked as the year of the apparitions.

Reverse:

- A crossbar and a cross surmount a large, bold letter 'M' – Jesus Christ's cross as an act of redemption for mankind, the foot of the Cross, and holiness of the nameplate initial of Mary
- Twelve stars mark the perimeter – the Twelve Apostles and the Church, and the vision of John the Apostle in Revelation 12:1: "And a great sign appeared in heaven: A woman clothed with the sun, and the moon under her feet, and on her head a crown of twelve stars", symbolizing the Woman of Apocalypse and Queen of Heaven
- Two hearts are depicted underneath the 'M', the left encircled with a crown of thorns, the right pierced by a sword, referencing Simeon's prophecy in Luke 2:35. From each, a flame emanates from the top.

== Church approval ==
In 1835, following the success of the Miraculous Medal, the archbishop of Paris, Hyacinthe-Louis de Quélen, initiated a canonical inquiry, which was entrusted to Canon Quentin, the Vicar General. Usually, official recognition of an apparition requires the local bishop to meet personally with the seer. However, in Labouré's case, this was not possible, as she insisted on remaining anonymous and silent.

In 1842, Marie-Alphonse Ratisbonne, experienced a sudden conversion from Judaism to the Catholic faith as he was wearing the Miraculous Medal as part of a challenge, upon entering the basilica of Sant'Andrea delle Fratte in Rome. He reportedly had a vision of the Virgin Mary, as depicted on the medal. This event underwent a canonical inquiry, and the Church approved the miracle, granting it ecclesiastical sanction. Alphonse became a Jesuit priest and missionary, and the miracle of his conversion is commemorated in the office of the Feast of the Miraculous Medal.

On July 23, 1894, Pope Leo XIII approved the Feast of Our Lady of the Miraculous Medal, composed by the Lazarists. This feast, with a special Office and Mass, was to be celebrated by the priests of the Congregation of the Mission yearly on 27 November. A decree on September 7, 1894, extended the privilege to other religious communities and allowed any priest to celebrate the Mass in chapels attached to the Sisters of Charity.

In 1897, Pope Leo XIII granted a canonical coronation of the statue "of the Immaculate Conception, known as the Miraculous Medal". In 1947, after a canonical inquiry, Pope Pius XII canonized Catherine Labouré as a saint, which includes an investigation into the apparitions of the Miraculous Medal. The Miraculous Medal was also granted indulgences by successive Popes; the 2004 Enchiridion Indulgentiarum grants the partial indulgence to the faithfuls of Christ who use a crucifix or cross, a crown, a scapular, a medal blessed by a priest.

== Veneration ==
In 1834, the priest John Vianney from Ars acquired a statue of Our Lady of the Miraculous Medal and placed it on a tabernacle with a door featuring the reverse side of the medal. On May 1, 1836, he consecrated his parish to "Mary conceived without sin".

After his ordination, the Franciscan priest Maximilian Kolbe wished to celebrate his first Mass at Sant'Andrea delle Fratte, where the Immaculate Virgin had converted Alphonse Ratisbonne. In 1917, he founded the Militia of the Immaculate, under the patronage of the Virgin of the Miraculous Medal. On his way to Japan in 1930, he visited France, including rue du Bac, and distributed Miraculous Medals, referring to them as his "ammunition".

Pope John Paul II used a slight variation of the reverse image as his coat of arms, the Marian Cross, a plain cross with an 'M' underneath the right-hand bar (which signified the Blessed Virgin at the foot of the Cross).

== Miracles ==
In 1833, the Lazarist priest John Gabriel Perboyre recounts the miraculous healing of a fellow priest through the Miraculous Medal. After arriving in China as a missionary, where he would later die as a martyr in 1839, he distributed many medals and reported numerous miracles in his letters.

In 1837, the Miraculous Medal was used by the Archbishop of Paris de Quélen for the conversion and reconciliation with the Church of Dominique-Georges-Frédéric Dufour de Pradt on his deathbed. de Quélen also obtained miraculous healings through the use of the medal and became an advocate of its propagation.

In 1842, the most famous conversion through the Miraculous Medal is that of Alphonse Ratisbonne, a Jewish man who was challenged to wear the medal during his trip to Rome. Upon entering the basilica of Sant'Andrea delle Fratte, he experienced a vision of the Virgin Mary as depicted on the medal, leading to his conversion. The miracle was approved by the Church.

== See also ==
- Chapel of Our Lady of the Miraculous Medal
- Marian Cross
- Medal of Our Lady of Tears
- Saint Benedict Medal
