= Louise de Marillac =

French Roman Catholic saint

Saint Louise de Marillac D.C.
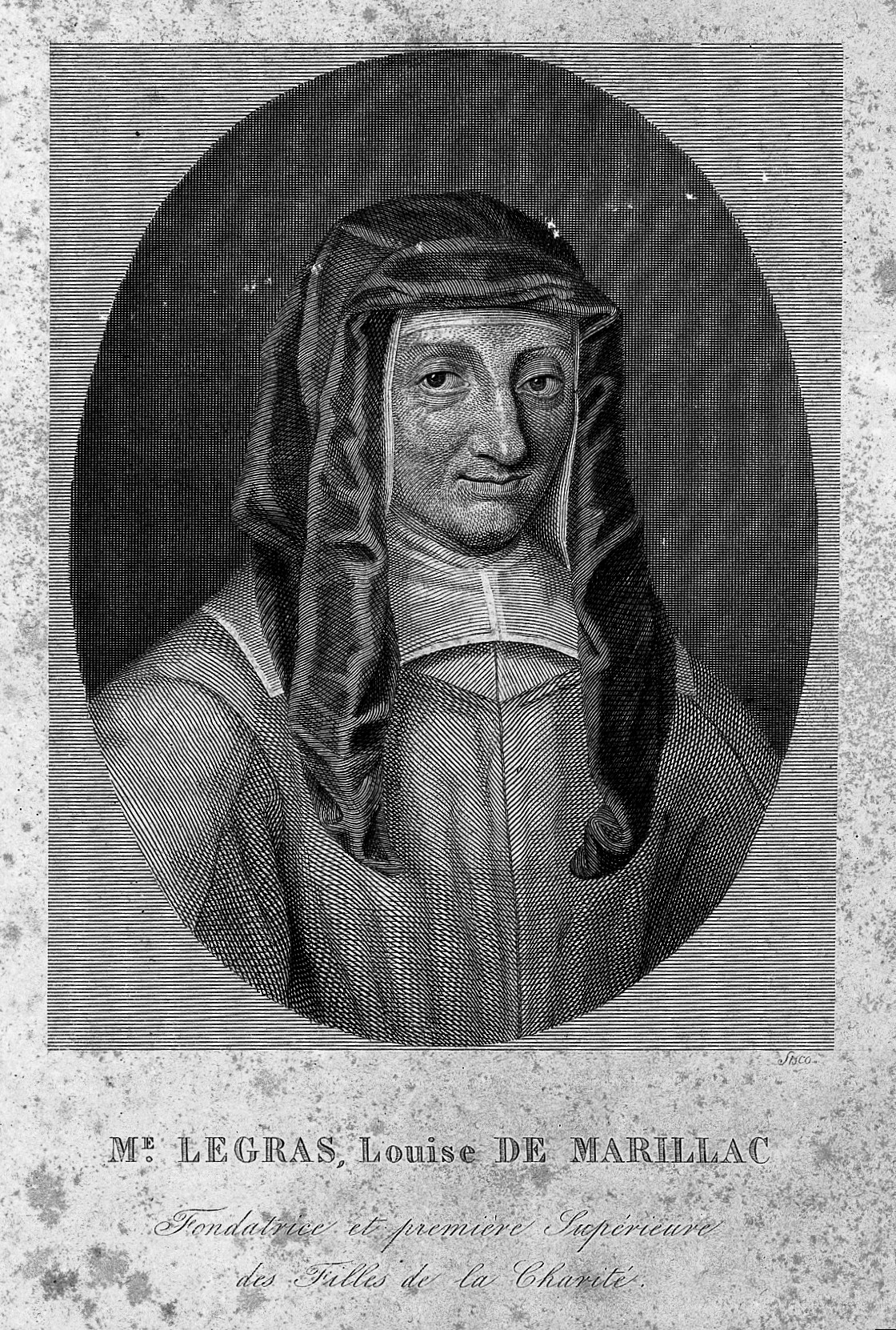

Wife, Mother, Widow, Foundress, Social Service Worker, Religious, Monastic, Workers of Charity
- Born: August 12, 1591; Ferrières-en-Brie, Picardy, Kingdom of France
- Died: March 15, 1660 (aged 68); Paris, Kingdom of France
- Venerated in: Roman Catholic Church
- Beatified: May 9, 1920, Vatican by Pope Benedict XV
- Canonized: March 11, 1934, Vatican by Pope Pius XI
- Major shrine: Chapel of Our Lady of the Miraculous Medal, Rue du Bac, Paris, France
- Feast: May 9 (since 2017; March 15 in some denominations)
- Attributes: Widow's clothing
- Patronage: Christian Social Workers; Disappointing children Loss of parents People rejected by religious orders Sick people Social workers Vincentian Service Corps; Widows

Louise de Marillac D.C., also known as Louise Le Gras, (August 12, 1591 – March 15, 1660) was the co-founder, with Vincent de Paul, of the Daughters of Charity. She is venerated as a saint by the Catholic Church and the Episcopal Church in the United States of America.

== Early life ==
Louise de Marillac was born out of wedlock on August 12, 1592 at Ferrières-en-Brie near Le Meux, now in the department of Oise, in Picardy, France. She never knew her mother. Louis de Marillac, Lord of Ferrires (1556–1604), claimed her as his natural daughter yet not his legal heir. Louis was a member of the prominent de Marillac family and was a widower at the time of Louise's birth. Her uncle, Michel de Marillac, was a major figure in the court of Queen Marie de' Medici and, though Louise was not a member of the Queen's court, she lived and worked among the French aristocracy. When her father married Antoinette Le Camus, she refused to accept Louise as part of their family. Thus Louise grew up amid the affluent society of Paris, but without a stable home life. Nevertheless, she was cared for and received an excellent education at the royal monastery of Poissy near Paris, where her aunt was a Dominican nun.

Louise remained at Poissy until her father's death, when she was twelve years old. She then stayed with a devout spinster, from whom she learned household management skills as well as the secrets of herbal medicine. Around the age of fifteen, Louise felt drawn to the cloistered life. She later made application to the Capuchin nuns in Paris but was refused admission. It is not clear if her refusal was for her continual poor health or other reasons, but her spiritual director assured her that God had "other plans" for her.

Devastated by this refusal, Louise was at a loss as to her next step. When she was 22, her family convinced her that marriage was the best alternative. Her uncle arranged for her to marry Antoine Le Gras, secretary to Queen Marie. Antoine was an ambitious young man who seemed destined for great accomplishments. Louise and Antoine were wed in the fashionable Church of St. Gervaise on February 5, 1613. In October, the couple had their only child, Michel. Louise grew to love Antoine and was an attentive mother to their son. Along with being devoted to her family, Louise was also active in ministry in her parish. She had a leading role in the Ladies of Charity, an organization of wealthy women dedicated to assisting those suffering from poverty and disease.

== Family and personal troubles ==
During civil unrest, her two uncles who held high rank within the government were imprisoned. One was publicly executed, and the other died in prison. Around 1621, Antoine contracted a chronic illness and eventually became bedridden. Louise nursed and cared for him and their child. In 1623, when illness was wasting Antoine, depression was overcoming Louise. In addition, she suffered for years with internal doubt and guilt for having not pursued the religious calling she had felt as a young woman. She was fortunate to have a wise and sympathetic counsellor, Francis de Sales, then in Paris, and then his friend, the Bishop of Belley.

== Decision on life ==
In 1623, at 32, she wrote:

On the feast of Pentecost during Holy Mass or while I was praying in the church, my mind was completely freed of all doubt. I was advised that I should remain with my husband and that the time would come when I would be in the position to make vows of poverty, chastity and obedience and that I would be in a small community where others would do the same...I felt that it was God who was teaching me these things and that, believing there is a God, I should not doubt the rest.

She vowed not to remarry if her husband died before her. She also believed that she had received the insight that she would be guided to a new spiritual director whose face she was shown. When she happened to meet Vincent de Paul, she recognized him as the priest from her vision.

Three years after this experience, Antoine died in 1625. Being a woman of energy, intelligence, determination and devotion, Louise wrote her own "Rule of Life in the World" that detailed a structure for her day. Time was set aside for reciting the Little Office of the Blessed Virgin Mary, attending Mass, receiving Holy Communion, meditation, spiritual reading, fasting, penance, reciting the Rosary and special prayers. Still, Louise managed to find time to maintain her household, entertain guests and nurture Michel, her 13-year-old son with special needs.

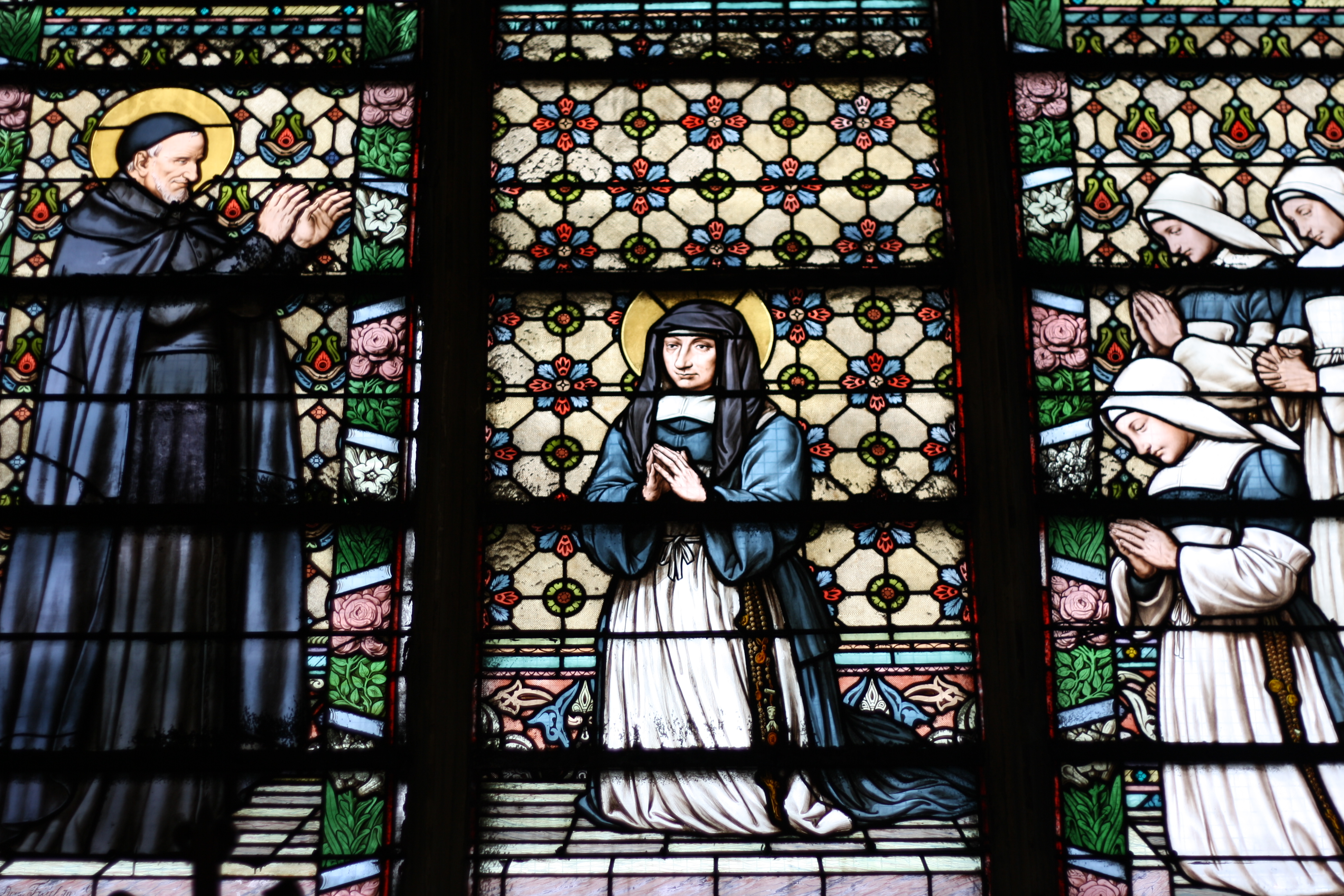
Vincent de Paul and Louise de Marillac

After Antoine died, Louise was widowed and lacking financial means; she had to move, and Vincent de Paul lived near her new dwelling. At first, he was reluctant to be her confessor, as he was busy with his Confraternities (later the Ladies) of Charity. Members were aristocratic women who helped him serve the poor and look after neglected children, a real need of the day, but many were also busy with their own concerns and duties. His work needed many more helpers, especially ones who were peasants themselves and so would be closer to the poor. He also needed someone who could teach and organize them.

Over the next four years, Vincent and Louise often met and also communicated by letters. Vincent guided Louise to a greater balance in a life of moderation, peace and calm. In 1629, Vincent invited Louise to become involved in his work with the Confraternities of Charity. She found great success in these endeavors. Then, in 1632, Louise made a spiritual retreat. Her intuition led her to understand that it was time to intensify her ministry with poor and needy persons. Louise, now 42, communicated this objective to Vincent.

== Daughters of Charity of St. Vincent de Paul ==
In 17th-century France, the charitable care of the poor was completely unorganized. The Ladies of Charity, founded by Vincent years earlier, provided some care and monetary resources, but it was far from enough. Vincent and Louise realized that direct service of the poor was not easy for the nobility or the bourgeoisie because of social class. The women took meals, distributed clothing and gave care and comfort. They visited the slums dressed in beautiful dresses next to people considered to be peasants. The tension, between the ideal of service and social constraints, was real. Besides, the families of the ladies often opposed the works. It soon became clear that many of the ladies were unfit to cope with the actual conditions.

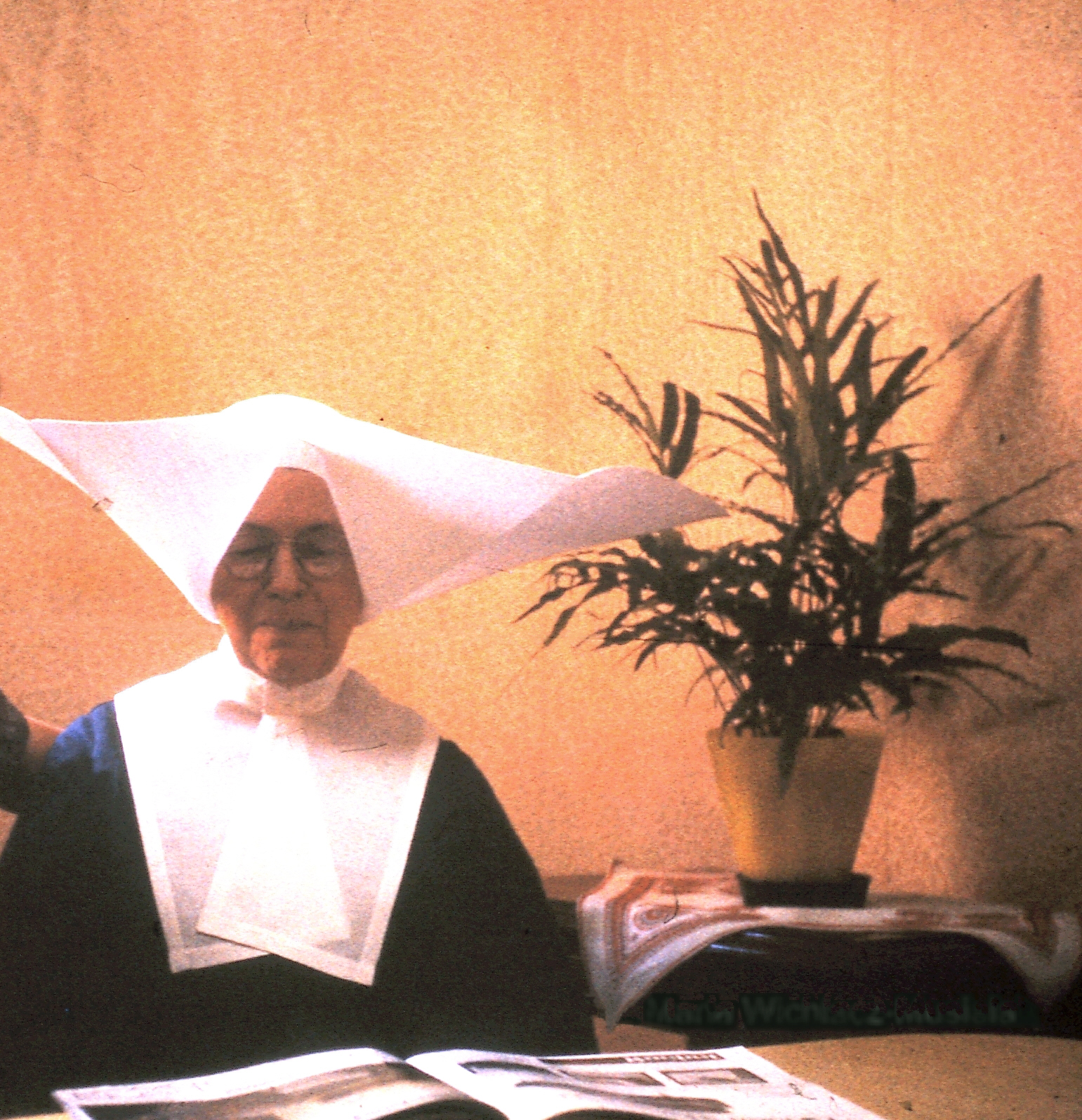
Until 1964, the traditional religious habit included a large, starched cornette.

While the aristocratic ladies were better suited to the work of raising money and dealing with correspondence, the practical work of nursing the poor in their own homes, and caring for neglected children was best accomplished by women of a similar social status to those served.

The need convinced Vincent to form a confraternity among the women of his parish in Châtillon-les-Dombes. It was so successful that it spread from the rural districts to Paris, where noble ladies often found it hard to give personal care to the needs of the poor. The majority sent their servants to minister to those in need, but often, the work was considered unimportant. Vincent remedied it by referring young women who inquired about serving persons in need to go to Paris and devote themselves to the ministry under the direction of the Ladies of Charity. These young girls formed the nucleus of the Daughters of Charity of St. Vincent de Paul.

Louise found the help she needed in young, humble country women, who had the energy and the proper attitude to deal with people weighed down by destitution and suffering. She began working with a group of them and saw a need for common life and formation. Consequently, she invited four country girls to live in her home in the Rue des Fosses‐Saint‐Victor and began training them to care for those in need.

Mobility was a major innovation. The Daughters of Charity were unlike established religious communities, whose religious women were behind cloister walls in a monastery and performed a ministry of contemplative prayer. "Love the poor and honor them as you would honor Christ Himself," Louise explained. That was the foundation of the Daughters of Charity, which received official approbation from the Vatican in 1655. Their distinctive habit, a grey wool tunic with a large headdress or cornette of white linen, was the usual dress of Breton peasant women of the 17th century and later.

At first, the Company served the needs of the sick and poor in their homes. Louise's work with these young women developed into a system of pastoral care at the Hôtel-Dieu, the oldest and largest hospital in Paris. Their work became well-known, and the Daughters were invited to Angers to take over management of the nursing services of the hospital there. As it was the first ministry outside Paris for the fledgling community, Louise made the arduous journey there in the company of three other Daughters.

After completing negotiations with the city officials and the hospital managers, Louise instituted collaboration among the doctors, nurses and others to form a comprehensive team. The model was highly successful and is still in use today by the Daughters of Charity. Under her guidance, they expanded their scope of service to include orphanages, institutions for the elderly and mentally ill, prisons and the battlefield.

In working with her sisters, Louise emphasized a balanced life, as Vincent de Paul had taught her. It was the integration of contemplation and activity that made Louise's work so successful. She wrote near the end of her life, "Certainly it is the great secret of the spiritual life to abandon to God all that we love by abandoning ourselves to all that He wills."

Louise led the Daughters until her death. Near the end, she wrote to her nuns: "Take good care of the service of the poor. Above all, live together in great union and cordiality, loving one another in imitation of the union and life of our Lord. Pray earnestly to the Blessed Virgin, that she might be your only Mother."

After increasingly ill health, Louise de Marillac died March 15, 1660, six months before the death of her dear friend and mentor, Vincent de Paul. She was 68, and the Daughters of Charity had more than 40 houses in France. The nuns were well respected and had made numerous philanthropic contributions across the world.

== Spirituality ==
Louise de Marillac

Aided by her directors, the young Louise had entered into profound prayer in the tradition of the Rhenish-Flemish spiritualists, and had been introduced to the French School of Spirituality of Cardinal Pierre de Bérulle. Louise, like Duns Scotus, viewed the Incarnation as the moment in which men and women were saved. In 17th-century France, there was discussion about the condemnation of Quietism so from the time of her death, mysticism was viewed with suspicion. In light of this, her biographer, Nicholas Gobillon, removed any traces of mysticism from Louise's writings and rewrote her meditations.

== Veneration ==
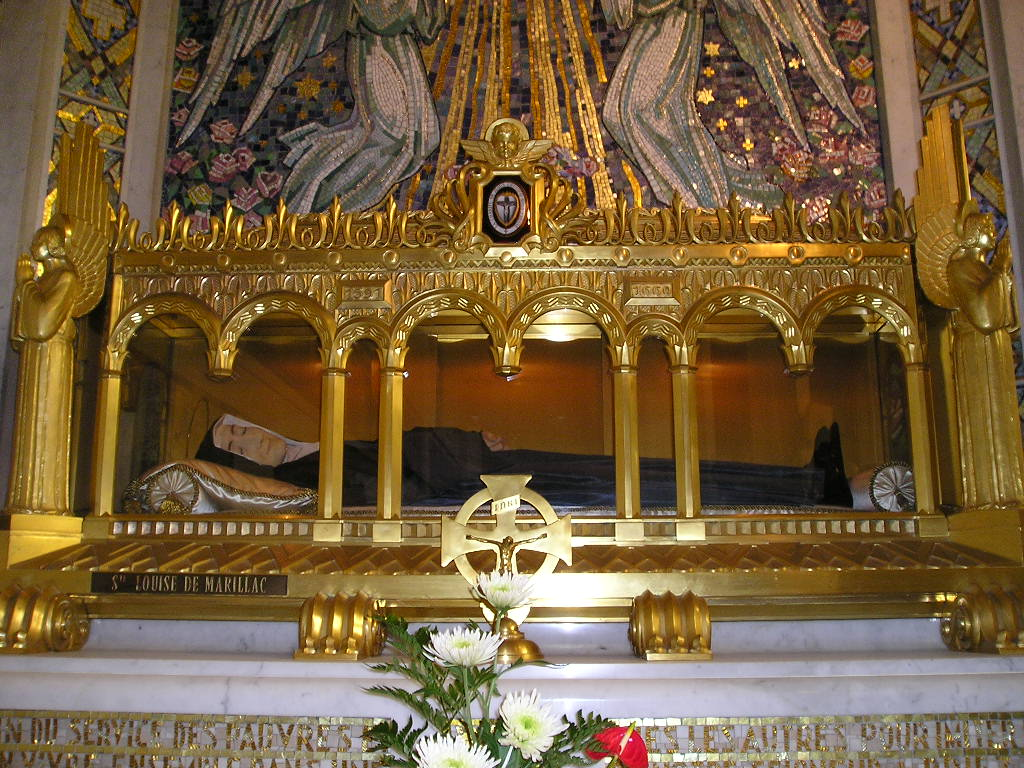
The effigy of Saint Louise de Marillac in the Chapel of Our Lady of the Miraculous Medal at 140 Rue du Bac, in Paris, France

Louise de Marillac was beatified by Pope Benedict XV in 1920 and she was canonized by Pope Pius XI on 11 March 1934. Her feast day is May 9 (March 15 until 2015). Her remains are enshrined in the Chapel of Our Lady of the Miraculous Medal, the chapel of the motherhouse of the Daughters of Charity, at 140 rue du Bac, Paris. She is mistakenly referred to as an incorrupt saint; the body enshrined in the chapel is actually a wax effigy, containing her bones. She was declared patroness of Christian social workers by Pope John XXIII in 1960.

In the Episcopal Church in the United States of America, she is honored with a Lesser Feast on 15 March in the church's liturgical calendar.

== Namesakes ==
- St. Louise de Marillac Parish is in Pittsburgh, Pennsylvania.
- St. Louise de Marillac Parish is in Bellevue, Washington.
- St. Louise de Marillac Parish and School are in LaGrange Park, Illinois.
- St Louise's Comprehensive College is in Falls Road, Belfast, Northern Ireland.
- St. Louise de Marillac Parish in Covina, California.
- De Marillac Academy in San Francisco, California.
- St. Louise de Marillac Parish is in Montreal, Quebec.
- St. Louise de Marillac Primary School is in Ballyfermot, Dublin.
- Marillac Medical Clinic for the Poor in Grand Junction, Colorado.
- Parroquia Santa Luisa de Marillac Santo Domingo, Republica Dominicana
- The Church of St Vincent de Paul and St Louise of Marillac served Potters Bar in Hertfordshire from 1962 until 2005.
