= Rue du Bac, Paris =

Street in Paris, France

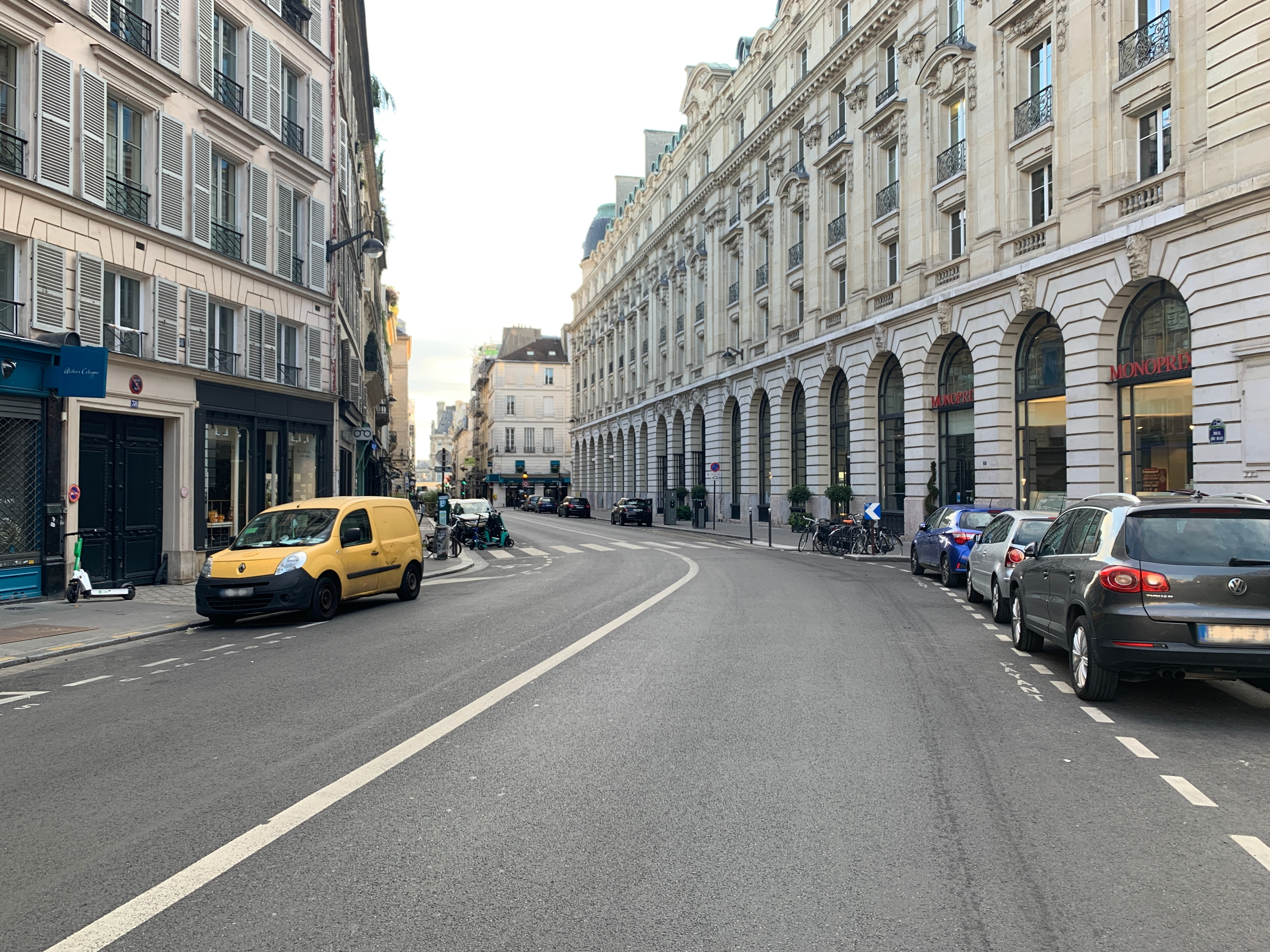
- Rue du Bac

- Location within Paris
- Length: 1,150 m (3,770 ft)
- Width: 20 m (66 ft) (average) between the quais Anatole France and Voltaire and the Boulevard Saint-Germain. 18 m between the Boulevard Saint-Germain and the Rue de Sèvres
- Arrondissement: 7th
- Quarter: Saint-Thomas d'Aquin
- Coordinates: 48°51′23″N 2°19′35″E
- From: Quai Voltaire and Quai Anatole-France
- To: Rue de Sèvres

Construction
- Completion: Opened between 1600 à 1610

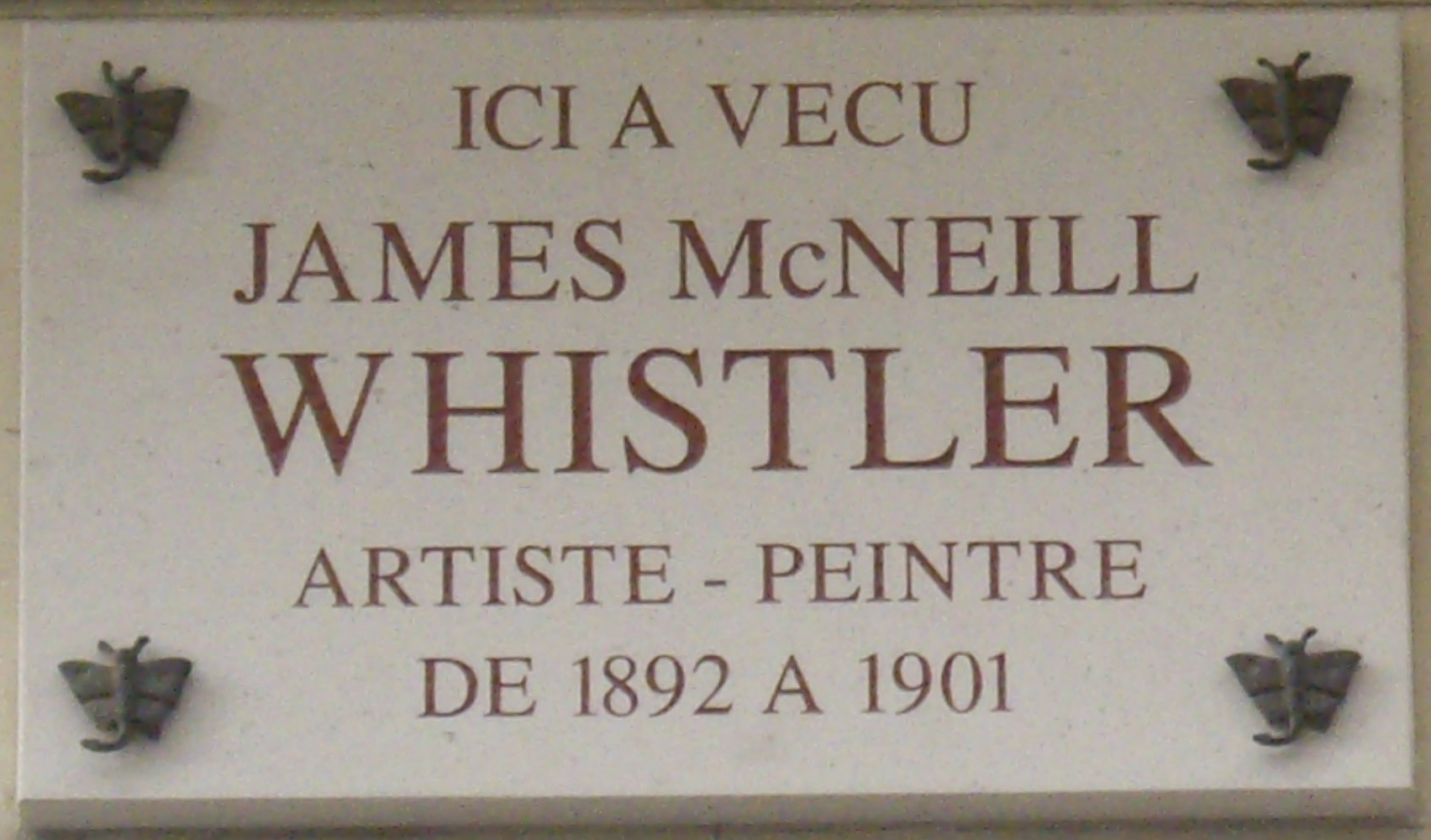

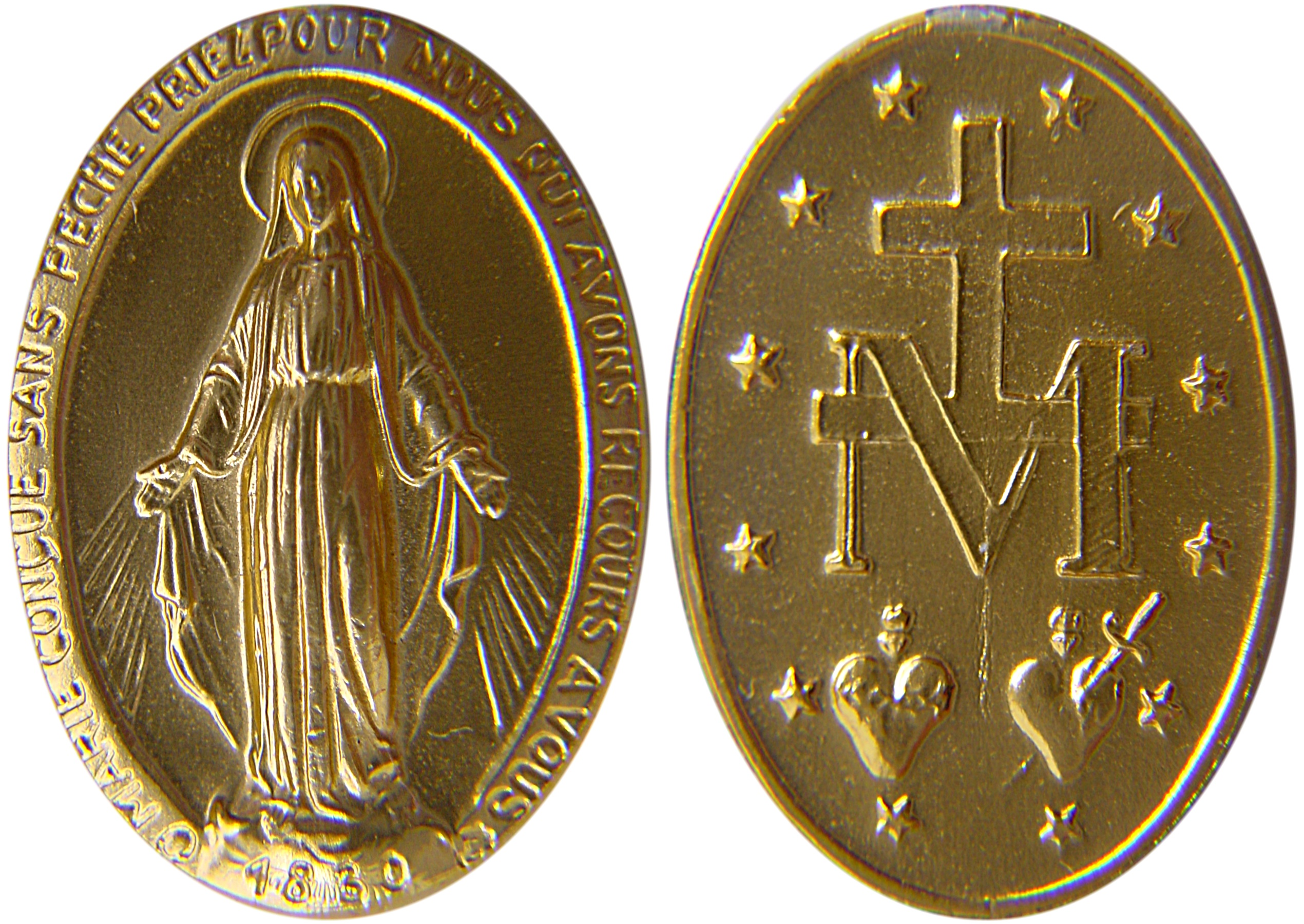
The Miraculous Medal. Saint Catherine Labouré is interred at 140 rue de Bac, one of the places where the Virgin Mary is believed to have appeared to her.

The Rue du Bac (French pronunciation: [ʁy dy bak]) is a street in the 7th arrondissement of Paris. The street, which is 1,150 m long, begins at the junction of the quais Voltaire and Anatole-France and ends at the Rue de Sèvres.

Rue du Bac is also a station on line 12 of the Paris Métro, although its entrance is actually located on the Boulevard Raspail at the point where it is joined by the Rue du Bac.

== History ==
The Rue du Bac owes its name to a ferry (bac) established around 1550 on what is now the Quai Voltaire, to transport stone blocks for the construction of the Palais des Tuileries. It crossed the Seine at the site of today's Pont Royal, a bridge constructed during the reign of King Louis XIV to replace the Pont Rouge built in 1632 by the financier Barbier.

Originally, the street was named the Grand Chemin du Bac, then Ruelle du Bac and Grande Rue du Bac.

== Notable buildings ==
=== Odd street numbers ===
- No. 1: Built by Auguste Rolin and C. La Horgue in 1882–83
- Nos. 83–85: Former monastery of the Immaculate Conception built in 1637. It also occupied nos. 87 and 89 rue de Grenelle, onto which the garden extended.
- No. 97: Hôtel de Ségur (also called Hôtel de Salm-Dyck). This house was built in 1722 for Pierre Henry Lemaître (also owner of the Château du Marais), perhaps by François Debias-Aubry. Some of the interior décor dates to that period. From 1786 to 1792 and from 1796 to 1798, it was occupied by Madame de Staël, who held a regular salon here.
- No. 101: Hôtel de La Feuillade

=== Even street numbers ===
- Nos. 2–4: The Caisse des dépôts et consignations, the public financial institution created in 1816 to control financial affairs in the public's interest
- No. 40: The door of this building opens on a perpendicular passage to the Rue du Bac. Inside the passage was the Hôtel Cochin where Charles de Montalembert lived.
- No. 44: In 1932, André Malraux wrote a portion of Man's Fate here.
- No. 46: The outside door has panels representing Prudence and Law, sculpted by Michel Varin. The original 18th-century interior had wood paneling adorned with work by the painters Carle Van Loo, Jean-Baptiste Oudry and Jean II Restout. It was dispersed at the end of the 19th century. Some of its elements have been redisplayed at the Musée Jacquemart-André, the Hôtel de Pontalba (Rue du Faubourg-Saint-Honoré) and the Castle of Vaux-le-Pénil (near Melun in Seine-et-Marne department).
- No. 70: Building from the years 1830–1840
- No. 102: Hôtel de Sainte-Aldegonde, built in the first half of the 18th century
- No. 104: This is where the artist, actress and draughtswoman Sonia Mossé lived until her deportation in 1943. She exhibited her sculpture at the Exposition Internationale du Surréalisme in 1938.
- No. 110: Across courtyard, studio and house constructed in 1812 for himself by Pierre-Louis Baltard, father of the architect Victor Baltard. The ground floor of the house was occupied by James McNeill Whistler from 1892 to 1901.
- Nos. 118–120: Two hotels, separated by a party wall, built between 1713 and 1715 by Claude Nicolas Lepas-Dubuisson for the Missions étrangères de Paris. The hotel at 120 is known as the Hôtel de Clermont-Tonnerre, named after the landlord who held the property at the end of the 18th century, and where François-René de Chateaubriand lived in 1838 and died in 1848. The doors representing the four corners of the world (the evangelical goal of the Missions étrangères de Paris) are probably the work of Jean-Baptiste Tureau.
- No. 128: Missions étrangères de Paris, an evangelical Catholic organization. The chapel was built between 1683 and 1689 by master mason Lepas-Dubuisson (father of the architect of 118–120).
- Nos. 136–140: Older buildings constituting the convent Maison des Filles de la Charité de Saint-Vincent-de-Paul (mother house of the Daughters of Charity of Saint Vincent de Paul), including the Chapel of Our Lady of the Miraculous Medal, the burial place of Saint Catherine Labouré. This is the address where the character Mr Klein lived in the 1976 film Mr Klein.

=== Destroyed buildings ===
- No. 84: Former entrance into the garden of the Hôtel de Galliffet, which has its main entrance at 73 rue de Grenelle; marked by a massive porch that was torn down in 1837
- No. 86: Site of the former Hôtel Dillon

== See also ==
- Daughters of Charity of Saint Vincent de Paul
