= St. Thomas Syro-Malabar Forane Catholic Church (Philadelphia) =

St. Thomas Syro Malabar Forane Church
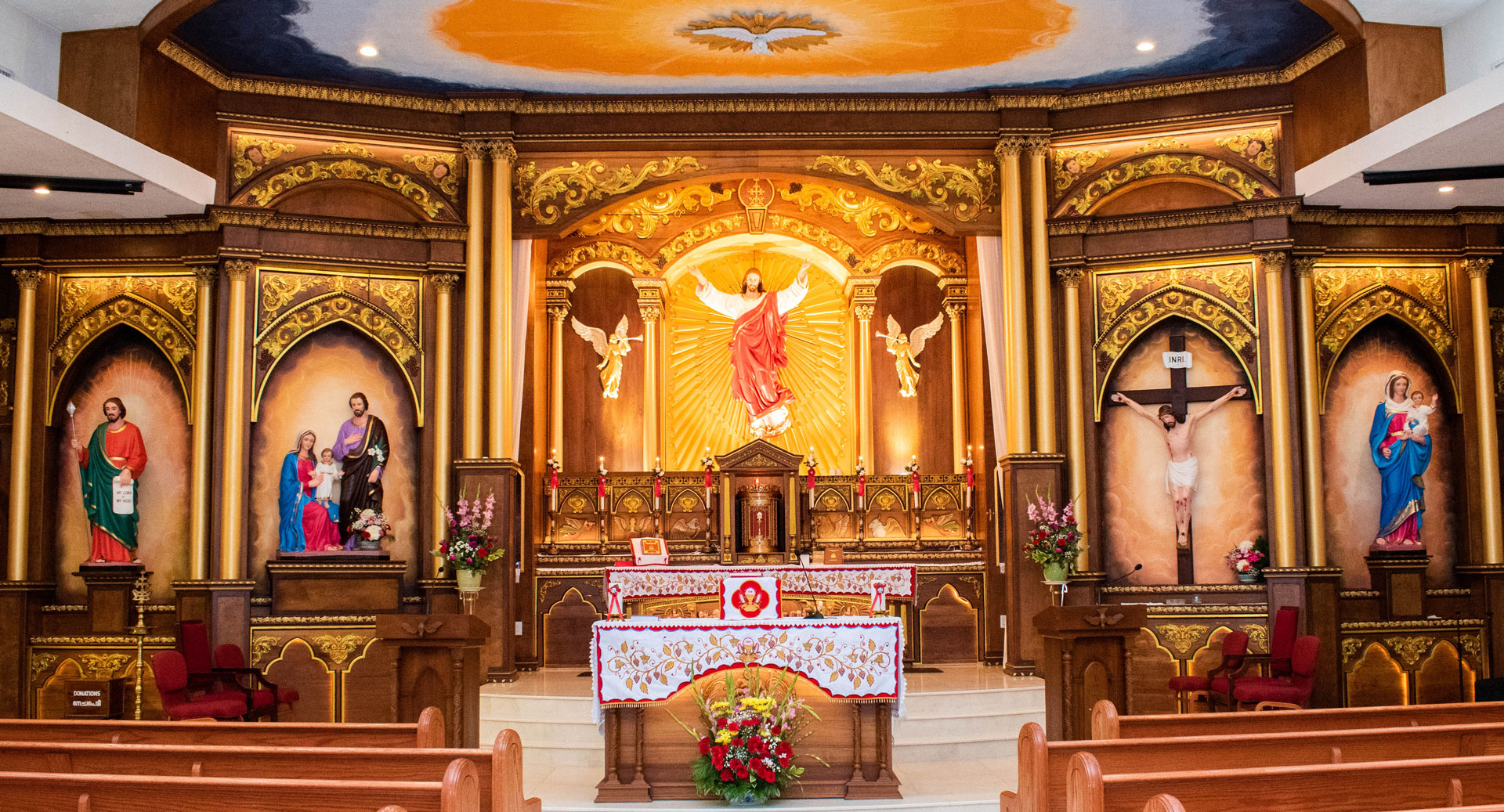

- Location within Pennsylvania Location within the United States
- 40°06′10.9″N 75°03′05.7″W
- Location: 608 Welsh Road. Philadelphia, Pennsylvania
- Country: United States
- Denomination: Syro-Malabar Catholic Church
- Website: syromalabarphila.org

History
- Dedicated: January 31, 2005
- Consecrated: March 19, 2005

Administration
- Diocese: St. Thomas Syro-Malabar Catholic Diocese of Chicago

Clergy
- Bishop: Joy Alappatt
- Vicar: Rev. Dr. George Danavelil
- Priest: Fr. Mathew Pallivathukal

The St. Thomas SyroMalabar Forane Catholic Church, Philadelphia is a Syro-Malabar Catholic Parish located in Philadelphia, Pennsylvania. It is one of the 9 Forane Churches for the St. Thomas Syro-Malabar Catholic Eparchy of Chicago.

== History ==
When the United States passed, the Immigration and Nationality Act of 1965. Many Indians moved from Kerala, India to the city of Philadelphia. In 1977, Around 100 families in the Philadelphia area established The Indian Catholic Association that celebrated Syro Malabar rite Qurbana or Mass to the people of Philadelphia.

In 1983, after consultation with the Syro Malabar Synod, Roman Catholic Archdiocese of Philadelphia established the Indian Catholic Mission to serve the Syro Malabar Community.

In 2001, Pope John Paul II established the Syro Malabar Eparchy of Chicago to serve Syro Malabar Catholics all over the United States with Rev Fr. Jacob Angadiath of Dallas selected as its first Eparch which then the Indian Catholic Mission then belonged to. Mar Jacob selected Rev. Fr. Jacob Christy Parambukattil to serve as the first mission director of the newly Syro Malabar Eparchy of Chicago led Mission.

On January 19, 2005, The Mission led by Fr. Jacob Christy bought a Synagogue facility from Temple Beth Torah. The Church was dedicated on January 31 of that year but after renovations was it officially became a Parish of the Syro Malabar Church Eparchy on March 19, 2005, for St. Joseph's Feast.

== Forane Church ==
In April 2014, Mar Jacob Angadiath announced that the Philadelphia Parish would be elevated to a Forane Church, one of the 9 due to the eparchy's geographical vastness and for better co-ordination.

There are 9 Syro Malabar Churches and Missions under the St. Thomas, Philadelphia Forane.

No.	Church/Mission Name	City
1	St. Jude Syro Malabar Church	Hammonton, New Jersey
2	Syro Malabar Mission (Delaware)	New Castle, Delaware
3	St. Alphonsa Syro Malabar Church	Baltimore, Maryland
4	Our Lady of Perpetual Help Syro Malabar Church	Washington, D.C.
5	St. Jude Syro Malabar Church	Chantilly, Virginia
6	St. Alphonsa Syro Malabar Church	Richmond, Virginia
7	St. Joseph Syro Malabar Mission	Harrisburg, Pennsylvania
8	St. Mary Syro Malabar Mission	Pittsburgh, Pennsylvania
9	St. Sebastian Syro Malabar Mission	Exton, Pennsylvania

== Vicars / Assistant Priests ==
The Church's Forane Vicar is currently held by Rev. Dr. George Danavelil. Fr. Danavelil was ordained on December 30, 1998, and served as the Secretary for the Syro Malabar Church Commission for Catechesis at Mount St. Thomas. He then went on to serve as Vicar in Churches in Ottawa, Charlotte, and San Francisco before being appointed by Jacob Angadiath as The Diocesan Director of Catechesis and then as Chancellor. He was appointed as Vicar of the Philadelphia Church in November 2023.

The Current Assistant Priest is Fr. Mathew Jacob Pallivathukal who was ordained on May 23, 2026.

No.	Name	Years	Post After
1	Rev. Fr. Jacob Christy Parambukattil	March 2005 – January 2009	St. Joseph's, Houston
2	Rev. Fr. John Melepuram	January 2009 – January 2013	South Jersey Mission
3	Rev. Dr. Augustine Palackaparambil	January 2013 – September 2014	Vicar General,Chicago
4	Rev. Fr. Johnykutty George Puleessery	September 2014 – April 2017	Chancellor,Chicago
5	Rev. Fr. Vinod Madathiparambil	April 2017 – June 2021	St. Alphonsa's, Atlanta
6	Rev. Fr. Kuriakose Kumbakeel	June 2021 – October 2023	Health Issues
7	Rev. Dr. George Danavelil	November 2023 – ongoing	Incumbent

== See also ==
- Syro-Malabar Church
- Syro-Malabar Catholic Eparchy of St. Thomas of Chicago
