= Catherine Labouré =

French Daughter of Charity and saint (1806–1876)

Saint Catherine Labouré DC
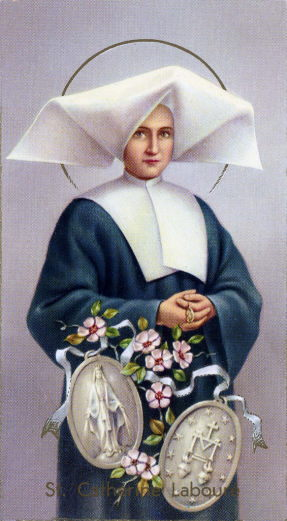
- Catherine Labouré in the religious habit of the DC and with the medallion of the Immaculate Conception

Virgin
- Born: 2 May 1806; Fain-lès-Moutiers, Côte-d'Or, France
- Died: 31 December 1876 (aged 70); Reuilly, Paris, France
- Venerated in: Catholic Church
- Beatified: 28 May 1933, Vatican City by Pope Pius XI
- Canonized: 27 July 1947, Vatican City by Pope Pius XII
- Major shrine: Chapel of Our Lady of the Miraculous Medal, Paris, France; 48.850974°N 2.323770°E
- Feast: 28 November (Vincentian Family); 31 December (2004 Roman Martyrology)
- Attributes: Daughters of Charity habit, Miraculous Medal

Catherine Labouré, DC (2 May 1806 – 31 December 1876) was a French member of the Daughters of Charity of Saint Vincent de Paul and a Marian visionary. She is believed to have relayed the request from the Blessed Virgin Mary to create the Miraculous Medal, now worn by millions of people around the world. Labouré spent forty years caring for the aged and infirm. For this, she is called the patroness of seniors.

== Early life ==
Catherine Labouré was born on 2 May 1806, in the Burgundy region of France to Madeleine Louise Gontard and Pierre Labouré, a farmer. She was the 9th of 11 living children. Her baptismal name was Zoe, but her family rarely used that name. Labouré's mother died on 9 October 1815, when Labouré was nine years old.

She and her sister Marie Antoinette moved to their aunt's house at Saint-Rémy, a village 9 kilometres (5.6 mi) from their home. It is there that Catherine had a dream of a priest, whom she later recognised as Vincent de Paul. The priest said to her: 'My daughter, it is good to care for the sick. For now, you flee from me, but one day you will be glad to approach me. God has plans for you. Don't forget it!'.

At the age of 12, Catherine returned to her father's farm to help care for her family. Later, her father, wishing to deter her from her religious vocation, sent her to Paris to work in his brothers' eating establishment for poor workers. There she observed their suffering and continued to desire a life as a nurse with the Daughters of Charity.

Labouré began her novitiate on 21 April 1830 at the convent on the Rue du Bac in Paris and on, 30 January 1831, she took her vows. It is at this convent that she had the visions of the Virgin Mary that led to the creation of the Miraculous Medal.

== Visions ==
=== Vincent de Paul ===
In April 1830, the remains of Vincent de Paul were translated to the Vincentian church in Paris. The solemnities included a novena. On three successive evenings, upon returning from the church to the Rue du Bac, Catherine reportedly experienced, in the convent chapel, a vision of what she took to be the heart of St. Vincent above a shrine containing a relic from his right arm. Each time the heart appeared a different color: white, red, and black. She interpreted this to mean that the Vincentian communities would prosper, and that there would be a change of government. The convent chaplain advised her to forget the matter.

=== The Virgin Mary ===
Labouré stated that on 19 July 1830, the eve of the feast of St. Vincent de Paul, she woke up after hearing the voice of a child calling her to the chapel, where she heard the Virgin Mary say to her, "God wishes to charge you with a mission. You will be contradicted, but do not fear; you will have the grace to do what is necessary. Tell your spiritual director all that passes within you. Times are evil in France and in the world".

On 27 November 1830, Labouré reported that Mary returned to her during evening meditations. She displayed herself inside an oval frame, standing upon a globe; rays of light came out of her hands in the direction of a globe. Around the margin of the frame appeared the words "O Mary, conceived without sin, pray for us who have recourse to thee." As Labouré watched, the frame seemed to rotate, showing a circle of twelve stars, a large letter M surmounted by a cross, and the stylized Sacred Heart of Jesus and Immaculate Heart of Mary underneath. Asked why some of the rays of light did not reach the earth, Mary reportedly replied, "Those are the graces for which people forget to ask." Mary then asked her to take these images to her father confessor, telling him that they should be put on medallions. "All who wear them will receive great graces."

Labouré did so, and after two years of investigation and observation of her normal daily behavior, the priest took the information to his archbishop without revealing her identity. The request was approved and the design of the medallions was commissioned through French goldsmith Adrien Vachette. They proved to be exceedingly popular—the Miraculous Medal was quickly adopted by millions of the Catholic faithful. It also played an important role in the proclamation by Pope Pius IX of the Immaculate Conception on 8 December 1854. The dogma of the Immaculate Conception had not yet been officially promulgated, but the medal, with its "conceived without sin" slogan, was influential in popular approval of the idea.

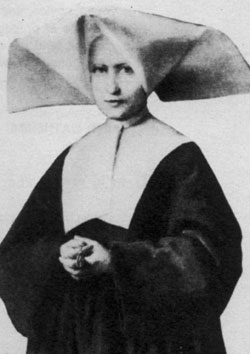
Portrait of Sister Catherine at the time of the apparitions

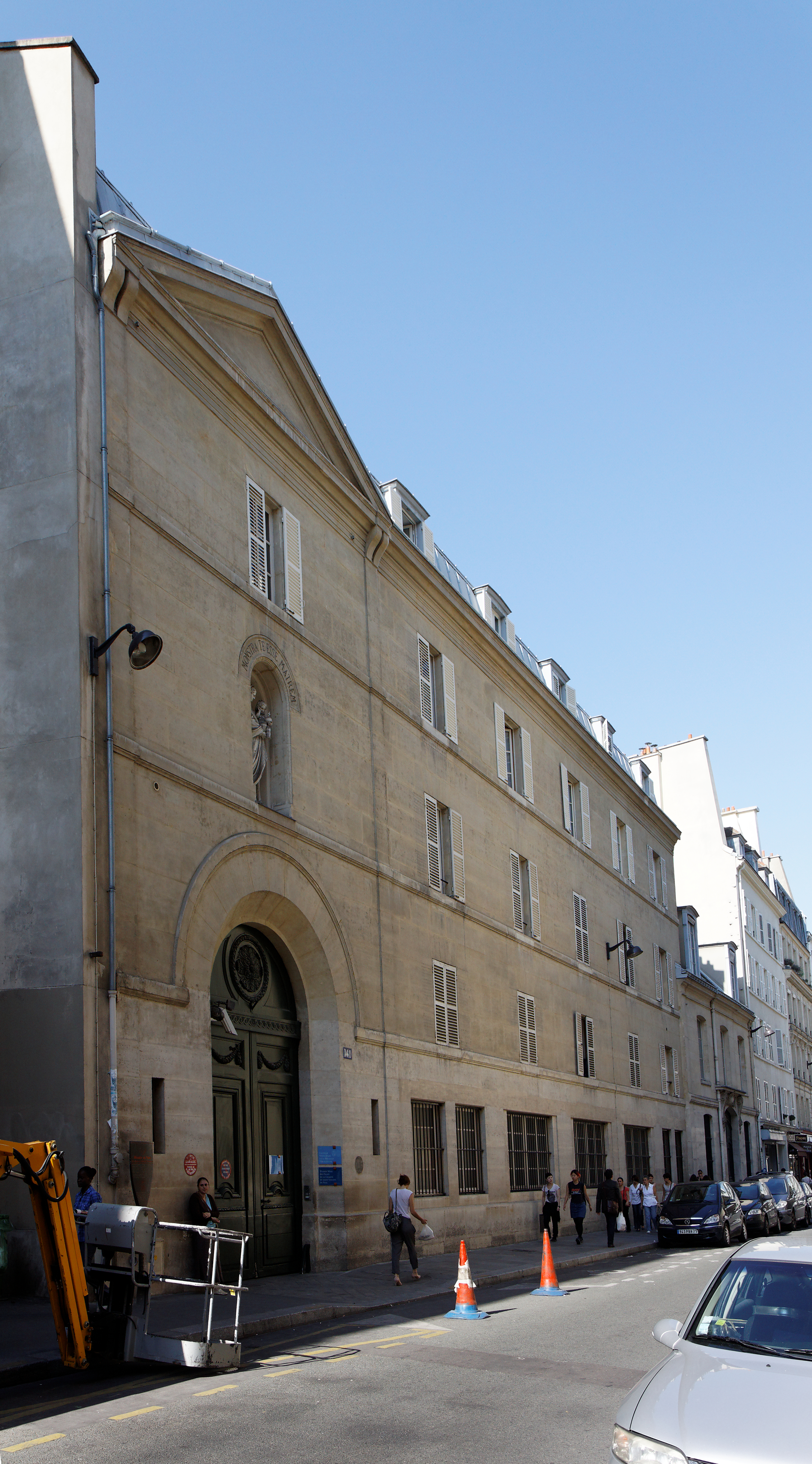
Convent of the Sisters of Charity, 136-140 Rue du Bac, Paris

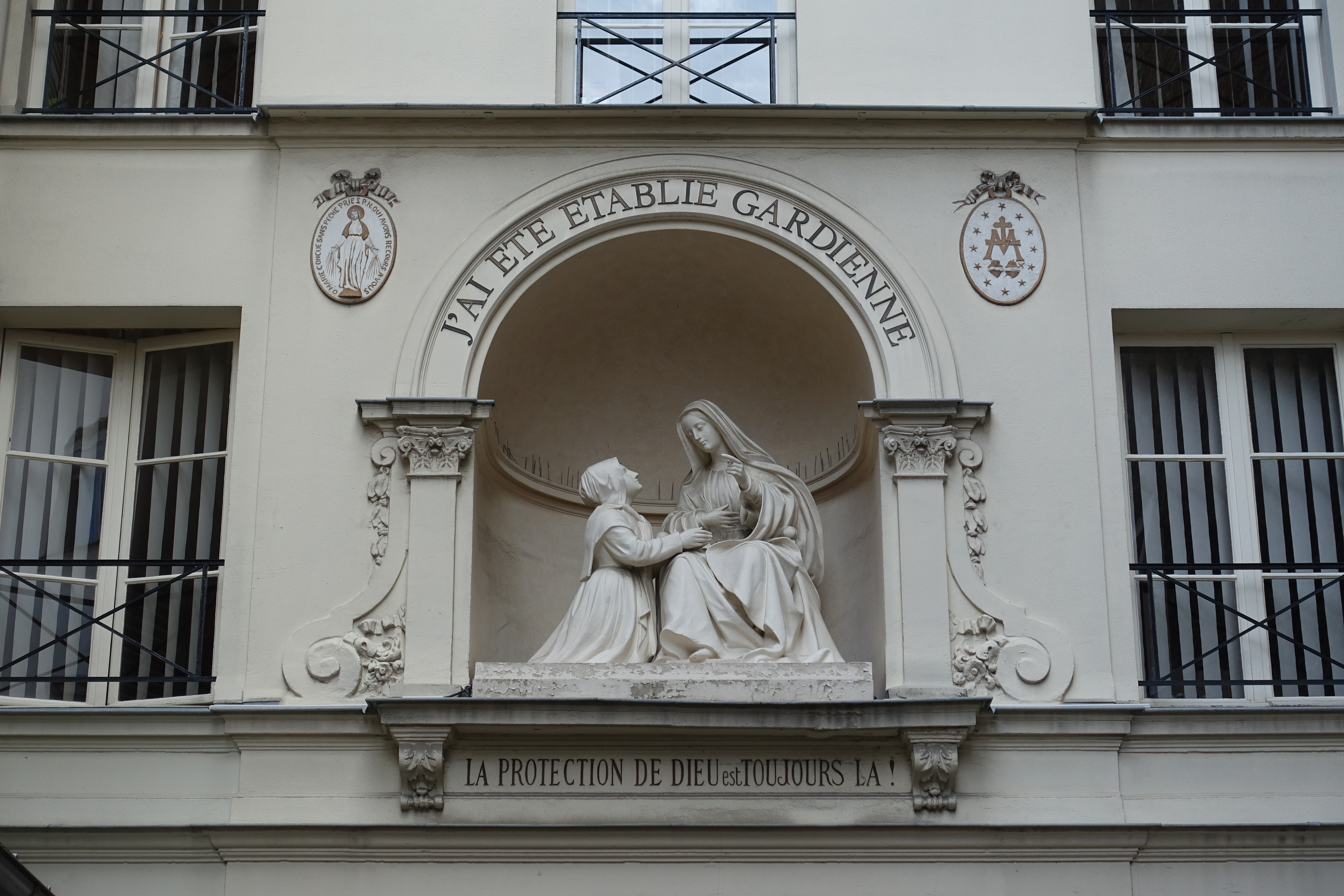
Detail from the Chapel of Our Lady of the Miraculous Medal in Paris

== Later life and service to the poor and elderly ==
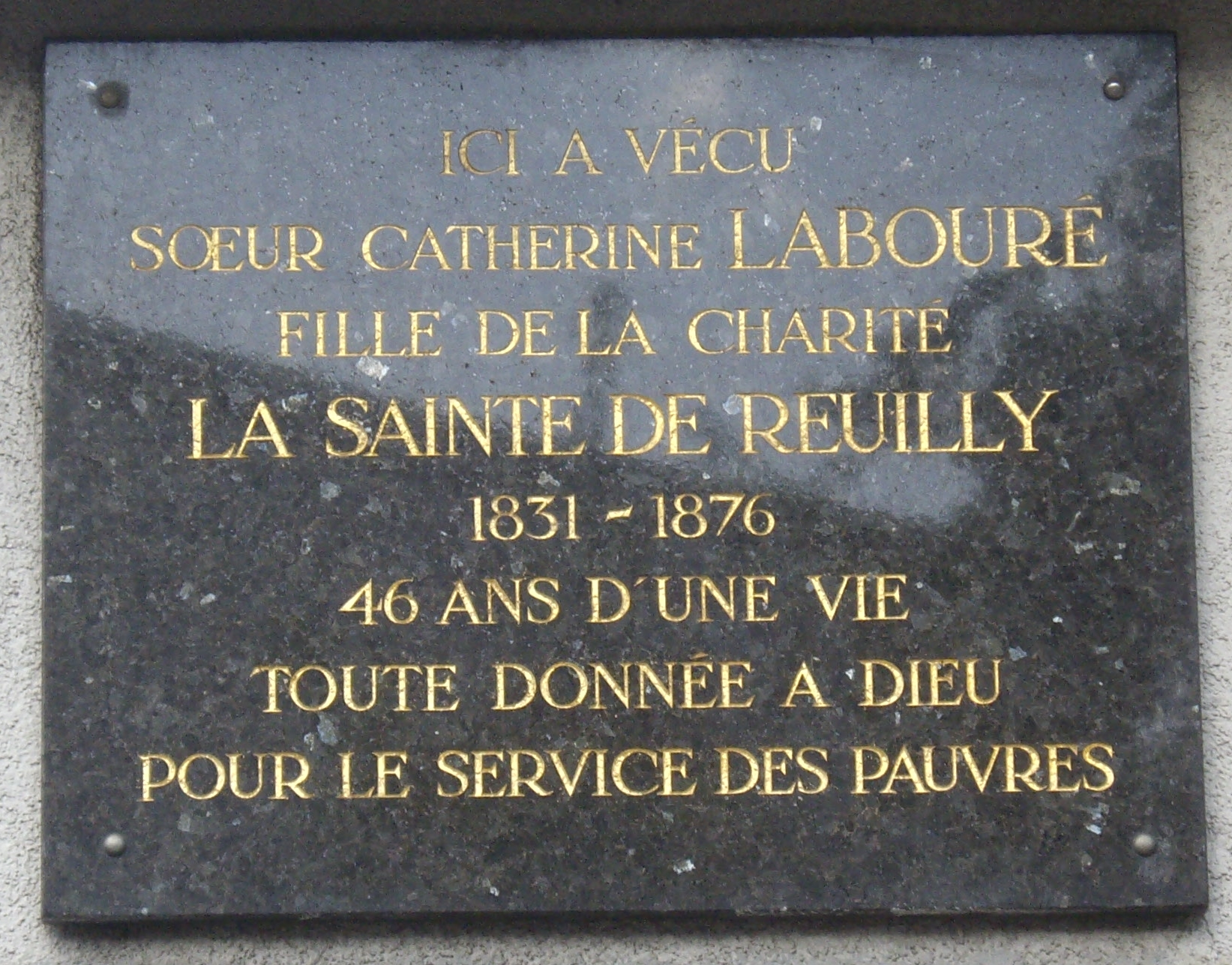
Plaque commemorating Catherine Labouré at 77 rue de Reuilly, Paris 12

Immediately after taking her vows, Labouré was sent to the Hospice d'Enghien, located in the village of Reuilly, which, at the time, was slightly outside the city limits of Paris. She spent the next forty years there, caring for the elderly and infirm. For this, she is called the patroness of seniors.

During this time, she not only cared for the sick, but also worked on the hospice's farm, looked after the poultry and cleaned the stables. Her life was notable for her devotion to the poor and elderly and for her humility and profound silence.

== Death and legacy ==
Labouré died in the Hospice on 31 December 1876, at the age of 70. Her body was later moved and is now encased in glass beneath the side altar in the Chapel of Our Lady of Graces of the Miraculous Medal in 140 Rue du Bac, Paris.

Her cause for beatification was opened upon discovery that her body was incorrupt. Catherine Labouré was beatified on 28 May 1933, by Pope Pius XI and canonized on 27 July 1947, by Pope Pius XII.

Her feast day is observed as an obligatory memorial on 28 November according to the Vincentian Family liturgical calendar, used by the Congregation of the Mission and the Daughters of Charity of Saint Vincent de Paul; it is an optional memorial in the Archdiocese of Paris. The 2004 Roman Martyrology lists her commemoration on 31 December.

There is a church under construction in Asia dedicated to her, the St. Catherine Labouré Church, Putatan of Sabah, Malaysia.

== Gallery ==
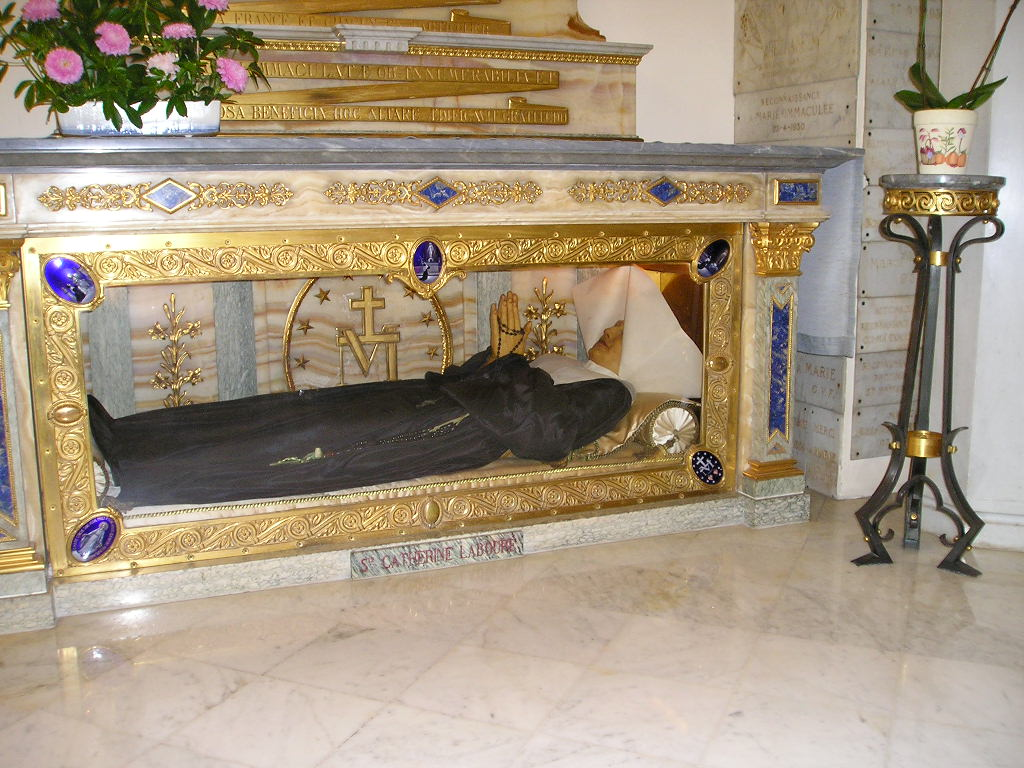
The incorrupt body of Saint Catherine Labouré

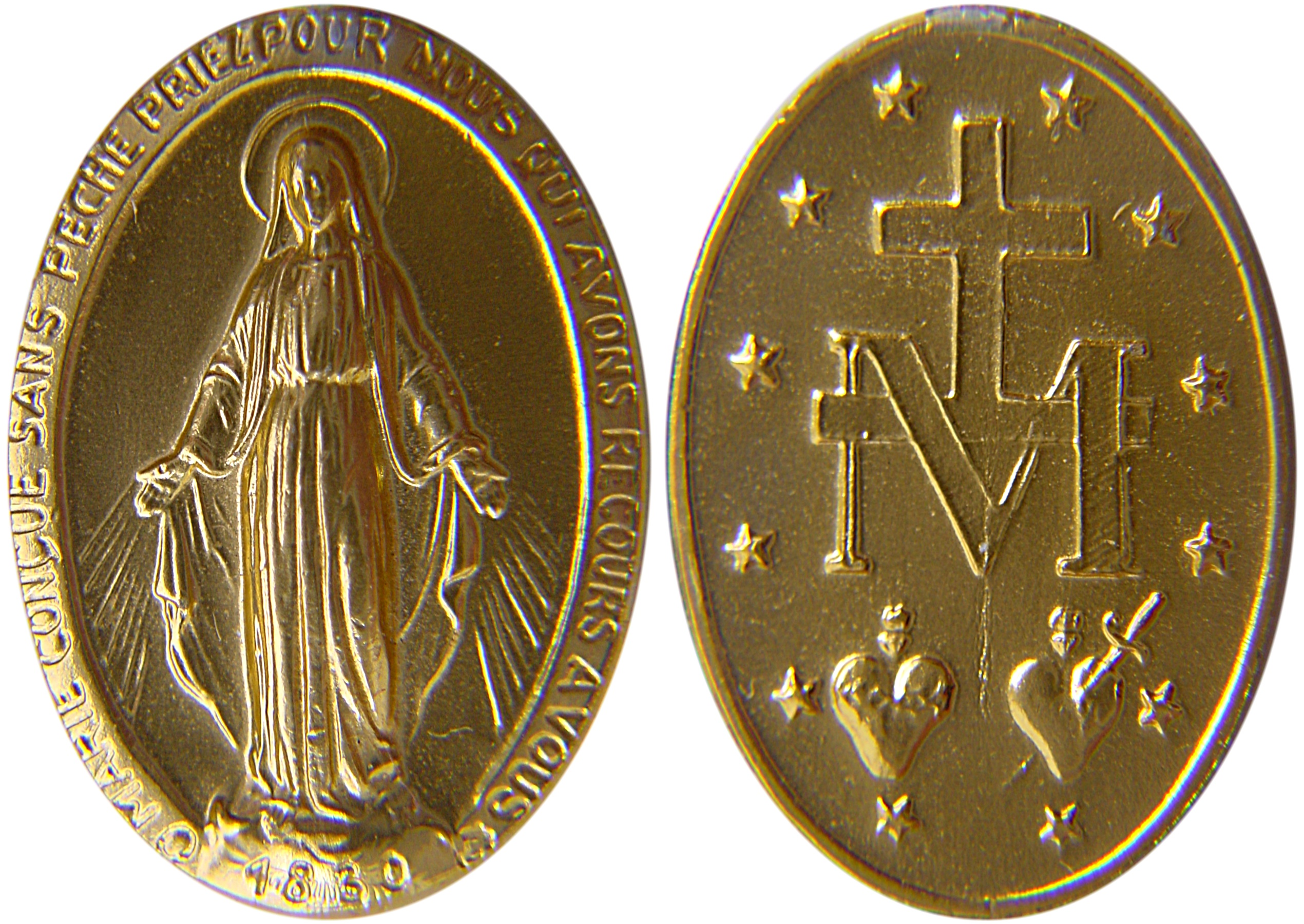
The Miraculous Medal of Our Lady of Graces

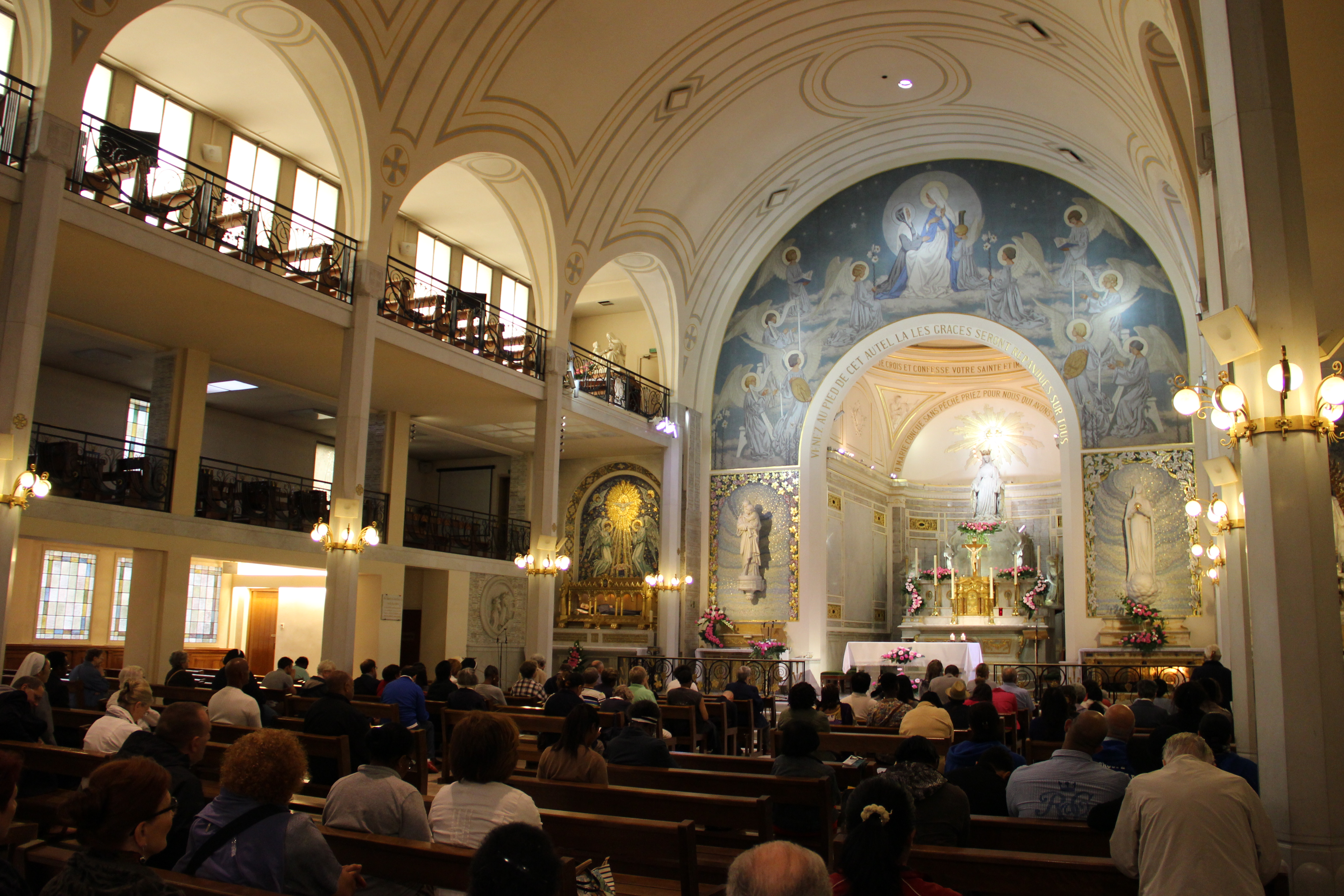
The Chapel of Our Lady of the Miraculous Medal

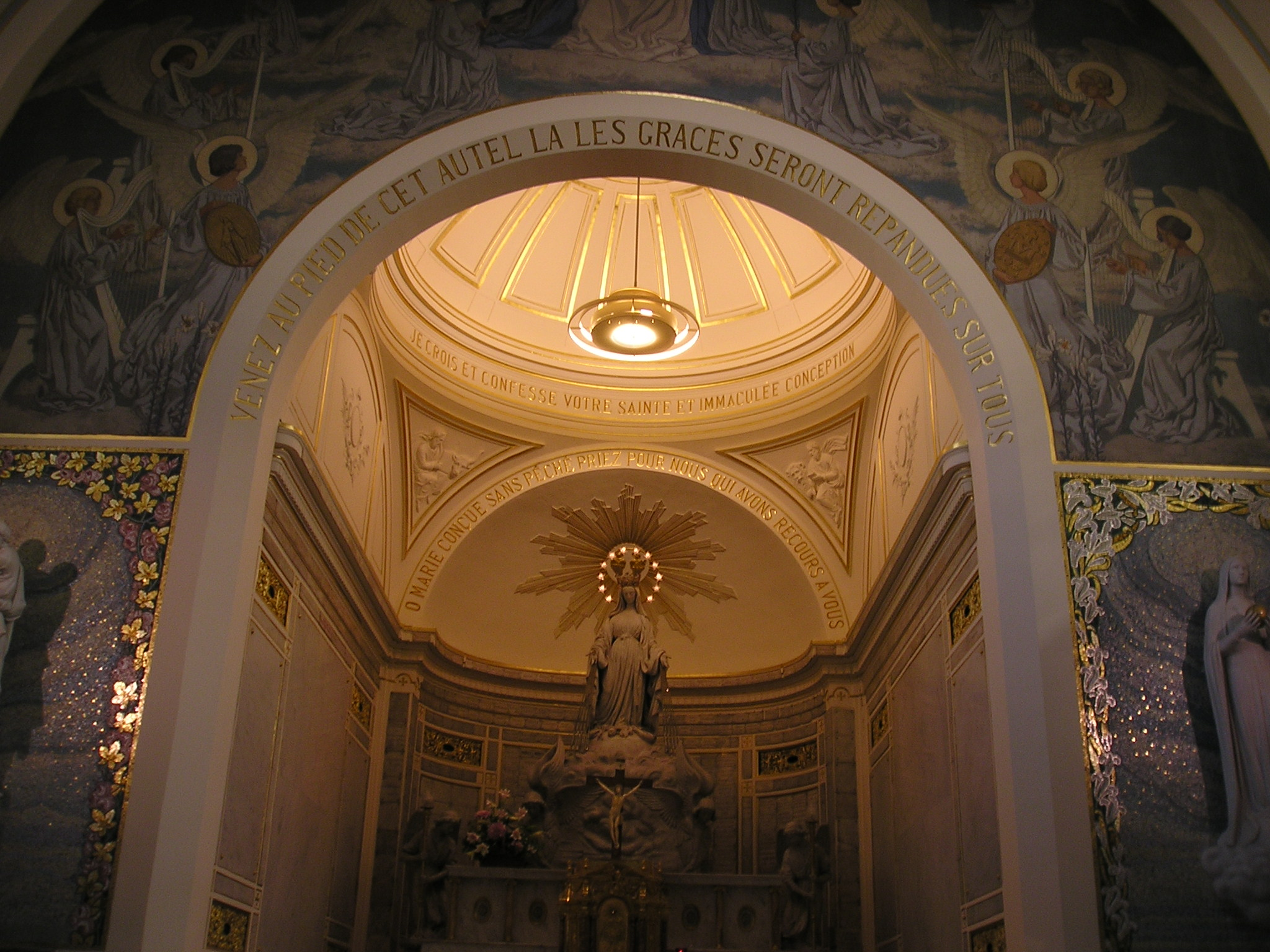
The Our Lady of Graces Chapel's altar in Rue du Bac, Paris

== See also ==
- Alliance of the Hearts of Jesus and Mary
- Green Scapular
- Saint Catherine Labouré, Patron Saint Archive

== General bibliography ==
- Saint Catherine Labouré of the Miraculous Medal, by Joseph I Dirvin, CM, TAN Books and Publishers, Inc, 1958/84. ISBN 0-89555-242-6
- Saint Catherine Labouré and the Miraculous Medal, Alma Power-Waters, Ignatius Press, San Francisco, 1962. ISBN 0-89870-765-X
- The Life of Catherine Labouré, by René Laurentin, Collins, 1980. ISBN 0-00-599747-X
