= John Vianney =

French Catholic priest and saint (1786–1859)

Saint John Vianney
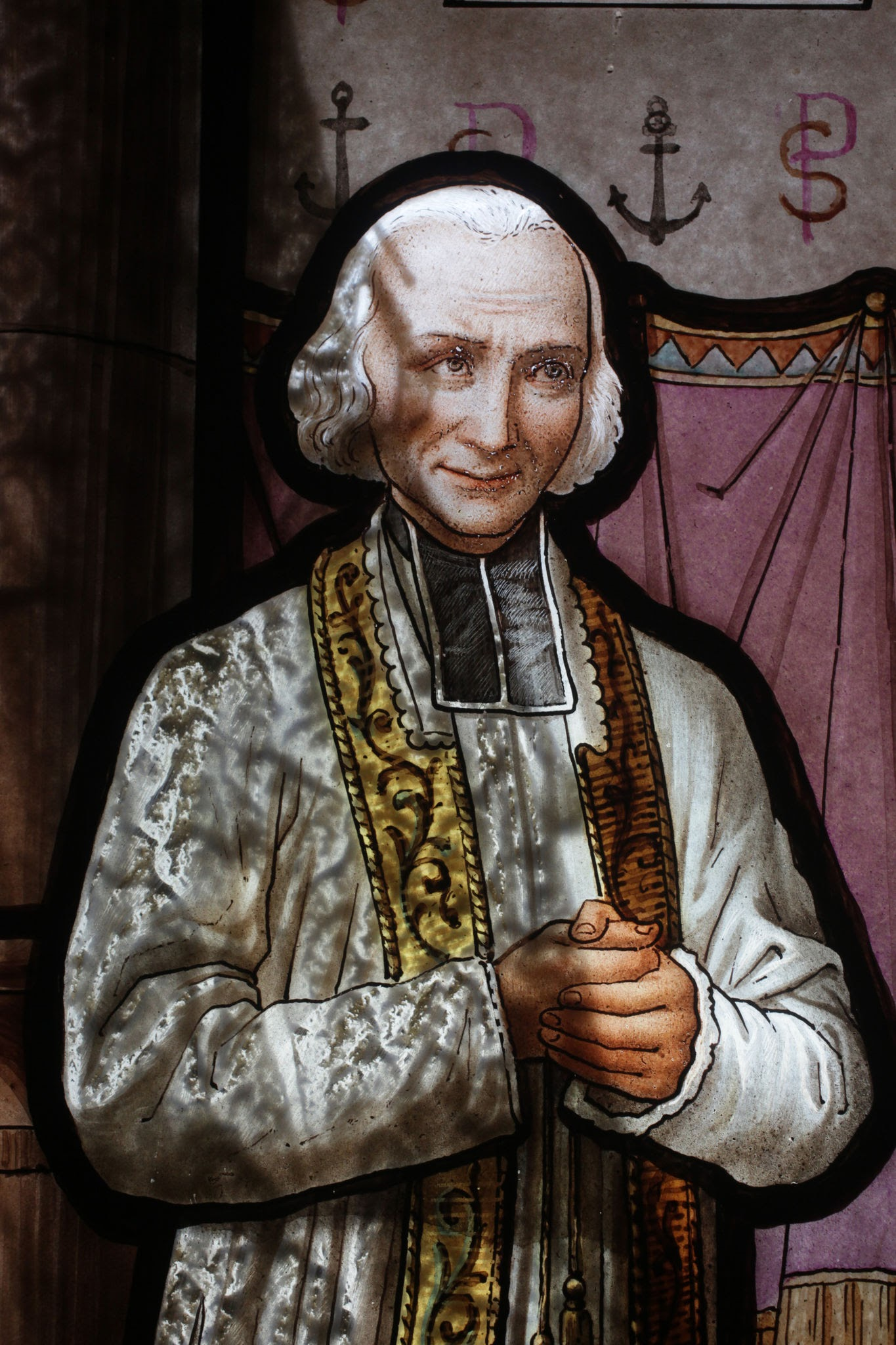

Priest and Confessor of the Faith
- Born: Jean-Marie Baptiste Vianney; 8 May 1786; Dardilly, Lyonnais, Kingdom of France
- Died: 4 August 1859 (aged 73); Ars-sur-Formans, Ain, French Empire
- Venerated in: Catholic Church; Anglican Communion
- Beatified: 8 January 1905, Vatican City by Pope Pius X
- Canonized: 31 May 1925, Vatican City by Pope Pius XI
- Major shrine: Shrine of St. John Vianney, Ars-sur-Formans, Ain, France
- Feast: 4 August; 8 August (Pre-1969 Roman Calendar); 4 August (Church of England)
- Attributes: Cassock, surplice, preaching bands, stole, rosary, crucifix, and a Bible
- Patronage: Parish priests; confessors; Personal Apostolic Administration of Saint John Mary Vianney; Archdiocese of Dubuque; Archdiocese of Kansas City

John Vianney (born Jean-Marie Vianney [ʒɑ̃ maʁi vjanɛ] and later Jean-Marie-Baptiste Vianney; 8 May 1786 – 4 August 1859) was a French Catholic priest and member of the Third Order of Mary who is often referred to as the Curé d'Ars ("the parish priest of Ars"). Canonized a saint in 1925, he is known for his priestly and pastoral work in his parish in Ars, France, resulting in the radical spiritual transformation of the community and its surroundings. Catholics note his saintly life, mortification, persevering ministry in the sacrament of confession, and ardent devotion to the Blessed Virgin Mary. His feast day is 4 August. He is the patron saint of parish priests.

== Early life ==
Vianney was born on 9 May 1786, in the French town of Dardilly, France (near Lyon), and was baptized the same day. His parents, Matthieu Vianney and his wife Marie (Belize), had six children, of whom John was the fourth. The Vianneys were devout Catholics who helped the poor. Vianney's paternal grandparents once hosted Benedict Joseph Labre, the patron saint of the homeless, who passed through Dardilly on his pilgrimage to Rome, in 1770.

By 1790, the anticlerical terror phase of the French Revolution forced many loyal priests to hide from the regime in order to carry out the sacraments in their parish. Even though to do so had been declared illegal, the Vianneys travelled to distant farms to attend Masses celebrated on the run. Realizing that such priests risked their lives day by day, Vianney began to look upon them as heroes. He received his First Communion catechetical instruction in a private home from two nuns, whose communities had been dissolved during the Revolution. He made his first communion at the age of 13, in a neighbour's kitchen; during the Mass, the windows were covered so that the light of the candles could not be seen from outside.

The Catholic Church was re-established in France in 1802, by Napoleon Bonaparte, resulting in religious peace throughout the country, culminating in a Concordat. By this time, Vianney was concerned about his future vocation and longed for an education. He was 20 when his father allowed him to leave the farm to be taught at a "presbytery school", in the neighbouring village of Écully, conducted by the Abbé Balley. The school taught arithmetic, history, geography and Latin. Vianney struggled with school, especially with Latin, since his past education had been interrupted by the French Revolution. Only because of Vianney's deepest desire to be a priest—and Balley's patience—did he persevere.

Vianney's studies were interrupted in 1809, when he was drafted into Napoleon's armies. He would have been exempt, as an ecclesiastical student, but Napoleon had withdrawn the exemption in certain dioceses, because of his need for soldiers in his fight against Spain. Two days after he had to report at Lyons, he became ill and was hospitalized, during which time his draft left without him. Once released from the hospital, on 5 January, he was sent to Roanne for another draft. He went into a church to pray, and fell behind the group. He met a young man who volunteered to guide him back to his group, but instead led him deep into the Forez mountains, to the village of Les Noes, where deserters had gathered. Vianney lived there for fourteen months, hidden in the byre attached to a farmhouse, and under the care of Claudine Fayot, a widow with four children. He assumed the name Jerome Vincent, and under that name, he opened a school for village children. Since the harsh weather isolated the town during the winter, the deserters were safe from gendarmes. However, after the snow melted, gendarmes came to the town constantly, searching for deserters. During these searches, Vianney hid inside stacks of fermenting hay in Fayot's barn.

An imperial proclamation in March 1810 granted amnesty to all deserters, enabling Vianney to go back legally to Écully, where he resumed his studies. He was tonsured in 1811, and, in 1812, went to the minor seminary, at Verrières-en-Forez. In the autumn of 1813, he was sent to the major seminary at Lyons. Considered too slow, he was returned to Balley. However, Balley persuaded the vicar general that Vianney's piety was great enough to compensate for his ignorance, and the seminarian received minor orders, and the subdiaconate on 2 July 1814, was ordained a deacon, in June 1815, and was ordained a priest, on 12 August 1815, in the Couvent des Minimes de Grenoble. He said his first Mass the next day, and was appointed the assistant to Balley in Écully.

== Curé (priest) of Ars ==
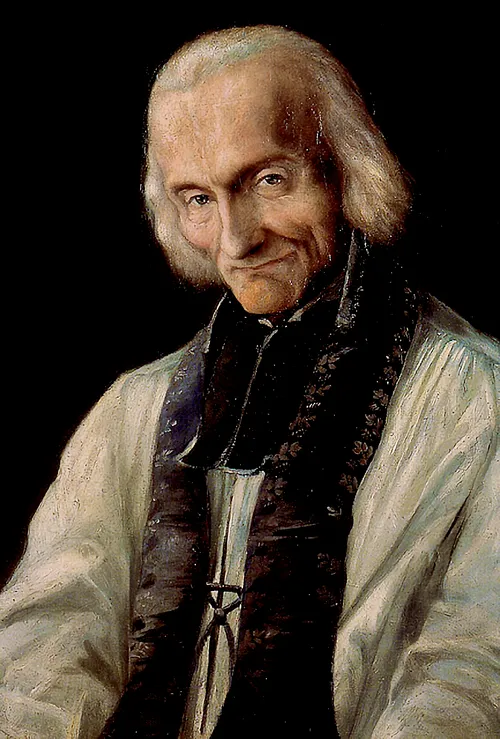
Saint Jean Vianney (the Curé of Ars)

In 1818, shortly after the death of Balley, Vianney was appointed parish priest of the parish of Ars, a town of 230 inhabitants. When Vianney's bishop first assigned him to Ars, Vianney got lost trying to find the town. A young shepherd, Antoine Givre, tending flocks in the fields pointed him in the right direction. With Catherine Lassagne and Benedicta Lardet, he established La Providence, a home for girls.

As parish priest, Vianney realized that the Revolution's aftermath had resulted in religious ignorance and indifference, due to the devastation wrought on the Catholic Church in France. At the time, Sundays in rural areas were spent working in the fields, or dancing and drinking in taverns. Vianney spent time in the confessional and gave homilies against blasphemy and profane dancing. If his parishioners did not give up this dancing, he refused them absolution. His stern sermons were later collected together in the famous "Sermons of the Curé of Ars", along with his moral Catechetical Instructions.

== Later years ==
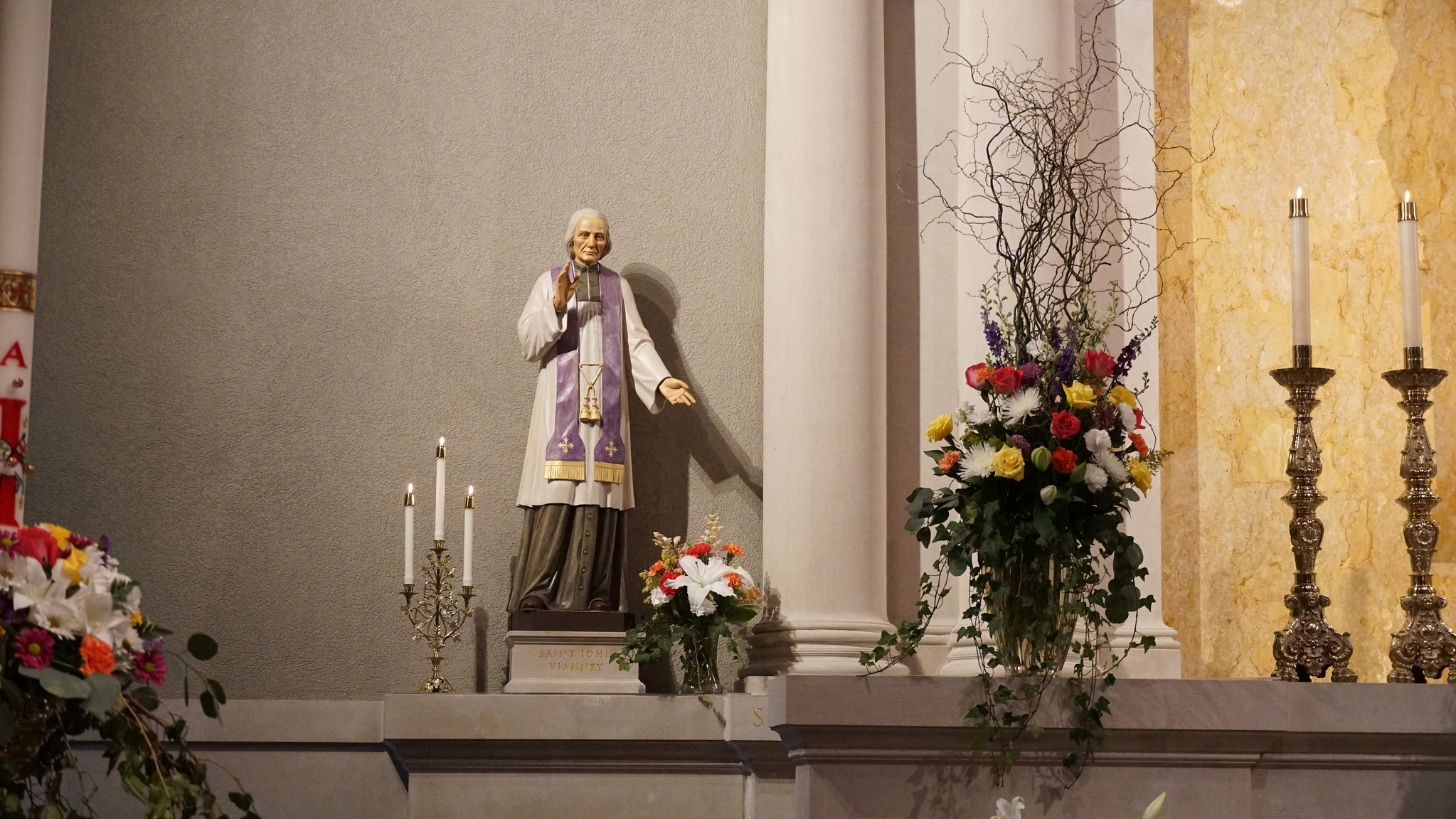
A statue of Saint John Vianney was installed in the newly renovated sanctuary at St. Catherine of Siena Parish Church, Trumbull, Connecticut, on 24 March 2019.

Vianney came to be known internationally, and people from distant places began travelling to consult him as early as 1827.

"By 1855, the number of pilgrims had reached 20,000 a year. During the last ten years of his life, he spent 16 to 18 hours a day in the confessional. Even the bishop forbade him to attend the annual retreats of the diocesan clergy because of the souls awaiting him yonder".

He spent at least 11 or 12 hours a day in the confessional during winter, and up to 16 in the summer. In his article "How does the Church Respond to Suicide?" Shaun McAfee references an incident described in the book Cure of Ars:

"... a woman ... told ... Vianney that she was devastated because her husband had committed suicide. She wanted to approach the great priest but his line often lasted for hours and she could not reach him. She was ready to give up and in a moment of mystical insight that only a great saint can receive ... Vianney exclaimed through the crowd, "He is saved!” The woman was incredulous so the saint repeated, stressing each word, "I tell you he is saved. He is in Purgatory, and you must pray for him. Between the parapet of the bridge and the water he had time to make an act of contrition."

Vianney had a great devotion to Saint Philomena. He regarded her as his guardian and erected a chapel and shrine in honour of the saint. In May 1843, he felt so ill that he thought that his life was coming to an end. He attributed his cure to her intercession. Vianney yearned for the contemplative life of a monk, and four times ran away from Ars, the last time in 1853. He was a champion of the poor as a Franciscan tertiary and was a recipient of the coveted French Legion of Honour.

== Death and veneration ==
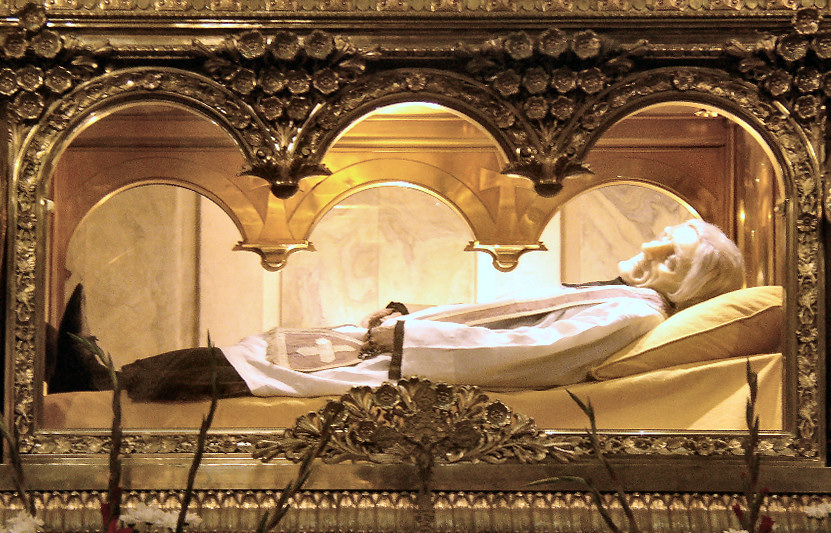
The body of Saint John Mary Vianney, entombed above the main altar in the Basilica at Ars, France. The face is covered with a wax mask.

On 4 August 1859, Vianney died at the age of 73. The bishop presided over his funeral with 300 priests and more than 6,000 people in attendance. Before he was entombed, Vianney's body was fitted with a wax mask.

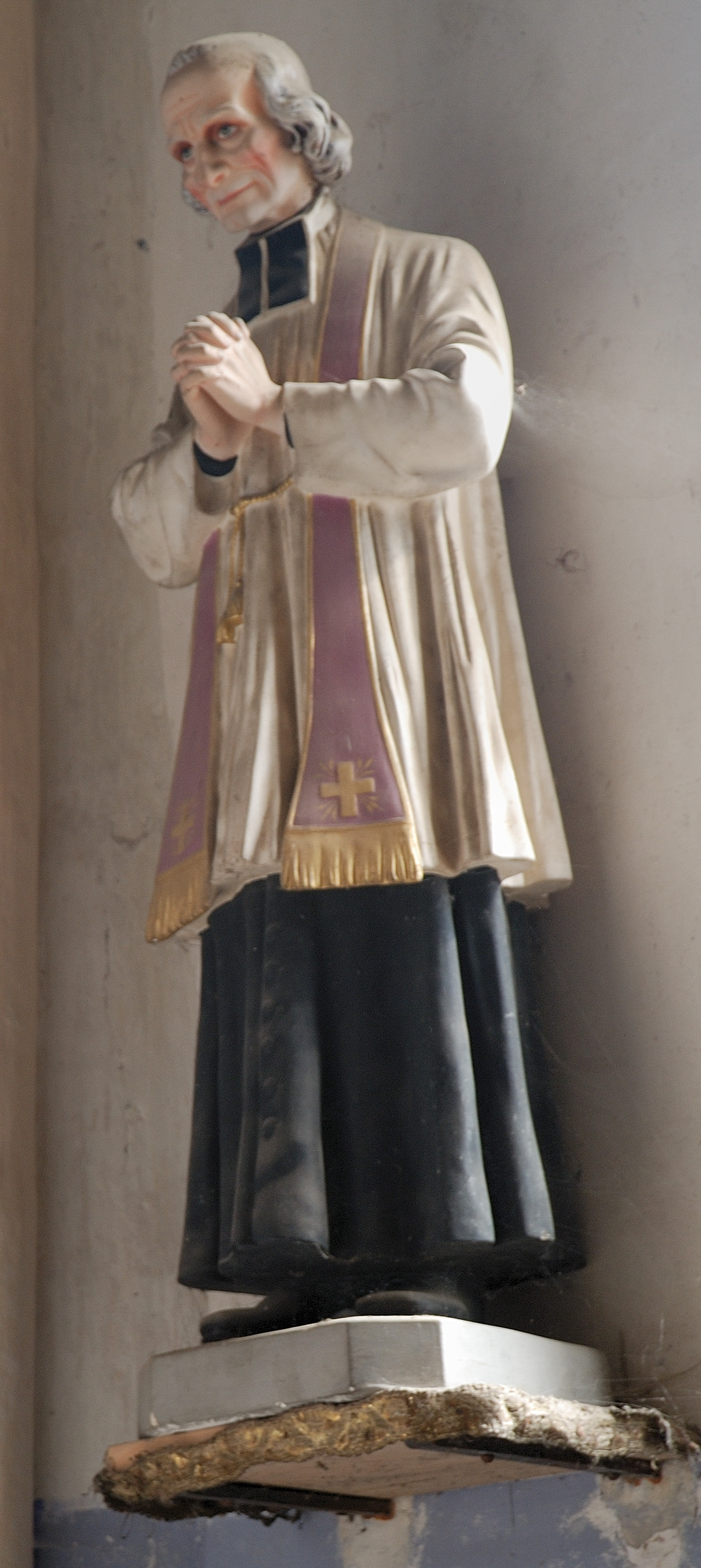
Statue of Jean-Marie Vianney in the church of a small village in France

On 3 October 1874, Pope Pius IX proclaimed him "venerable"; on 8 January 1905, Pope Pius X declared him Blessed and proposed him as a model to the parochial clergy. In 1925 John Mary Vianney was canonized by Pope Pius XI, who in 1929 made him patron saint of parish priests. In 1928 his feast day was inserted into the General Roman Calendar for celebration on 9 August. Pope John XXIII's 1960 revision, in which the Vigil of Saint Lawrence had a high rank, moved the feast to 8 August. Finally, the 1969 revision placed it on 4 August, the day of his death.

In 1959, to commemorate the centenary of John Vianney's death, Pope John XXIII issued the encyclical letter Sacerdotii nostri primordia. John Paul II visited Ars in person in 1986 in connection with the bicentenary of Vianney's birth and referred to him as a "rare example of a pastor acutely aware of his responsibilities ... and a sign of courage for those who today experience the grace of being called to the priesthood." In honour of the 150th anniversary of Vianney's death, Pope Benedict XVI declared 2009–2010 a Year for Priests, beginning on the Feast of the Sacred Heart.

The Vatican Postal Service issued a set of stamps to commemorate the 150th Anniversary. With the following words on 16 June 2009, Benedict XVI officially marked the beginning of the year dedicated to priests, "On the forthcoming Solemnity of the Most Sacred Heart of Jesus, Friday 19 June 2009 – a day traditionally devoted to prayer for the sanctification of the clergy –, I have decided to inaugurate a ‘Year of the Priest’ in celebration of the 150th anniversary of the dies natalis of John Mary Vianney, the Patron Saint of parish priests worldwide".

Pope Benedict XVI declared 19 June 2009 – 19 June 2010 a Year for Priests to encourage priests to strive for spiritual perfection. In the Pope's words the Curé d'Ars is "a true example of a pastor at the service of Christ's flock." There are statues of Vianney in many French churches and in Catholic churches throughout the world. Also, many parishes founded in the twentieth and twenty-first centuries are named after him. Some relics are kept in the Church of Notre-Dame de la Salette in Paris. Vianney is remembered in the Anglican Communion with a commemoration on 4 August.

== "Heart of a Priest" relic tour ==
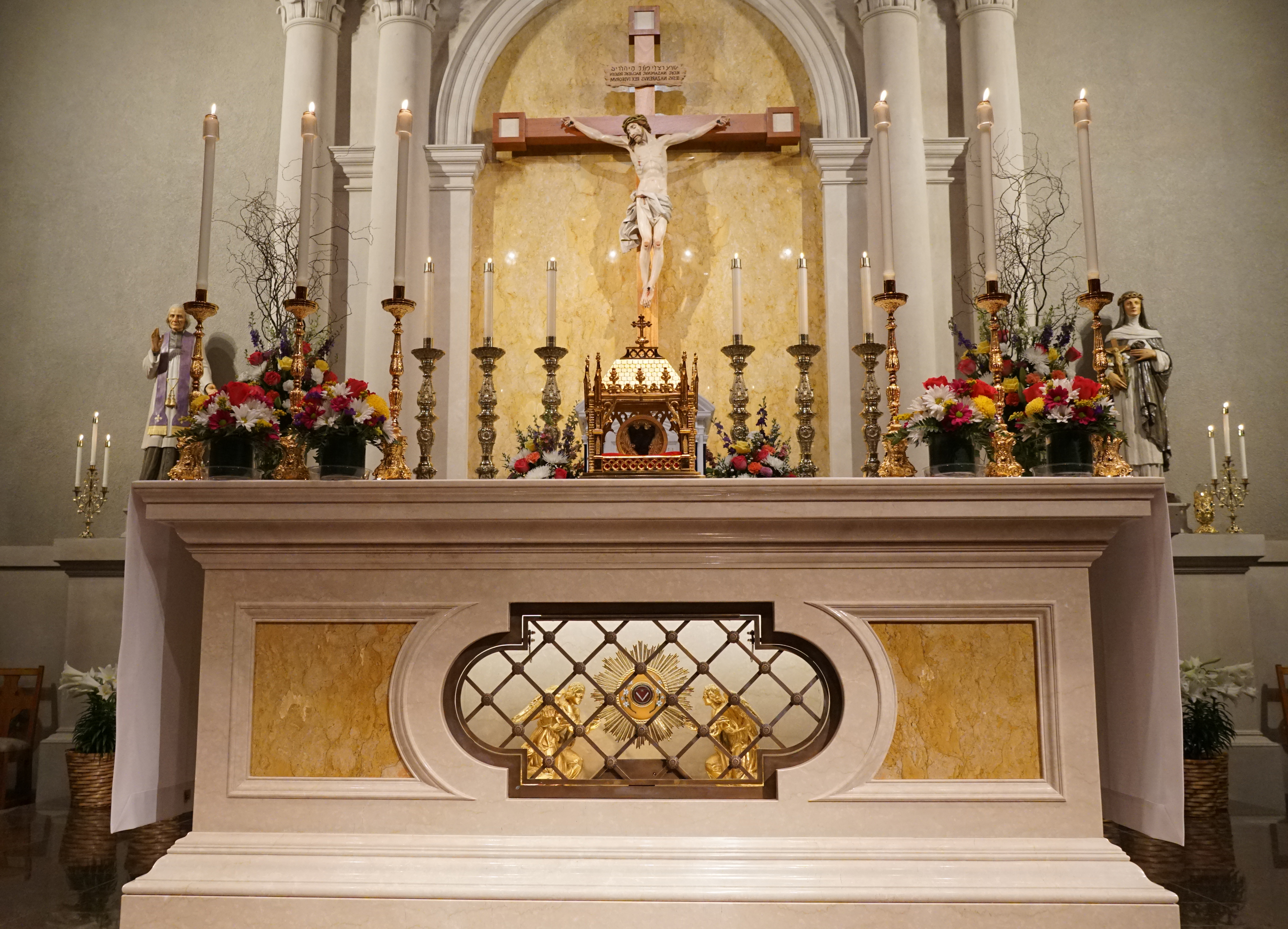
A statue of Saint John Vianney is visible on the left side of the photo.

In November 2018, Vianney's heart was transported to the United States for a 6-month nationwide tour. As Joe Bollig explained in his article detailing the relic's unexpected stop in Kansas City, "The heart receives special veneration because in Scripture it is considered to be a person's hidden centre of emotional, intellectual and moral activity. Saint John Vianney is said to have lived his life according to the heart of Christ and united his heart to Christ's." By the end of the tour, "the relic [had] travelled almost 36,000 miles [58,000 km]—almost one and a half times the circumference of the Earth—and was available for over 1,200 hours of public veneration." The tour of the incorrupt heart of John Vianney came to the Parish of St. Catherine of Siena in Trumbull, Connecticut, on April 29, 2019.

== Notable namesake institutions ==
There are dozens of institutions, including schools, seminaries, and churches named after Vianney in countries including Belize, Brazil, Canada, Guatemala, Haiti, Ireland, India, Pakistan, Indonesia, Philippines, England, United States, Nigeria, South Africa, New Zealand and Australia.

- Curé of Ars Roman Catholic Church (Merrick, New York, US)
- St. John Vianney Catholic Church (Round Rock, Texas, US)
- Personal Apostolic Administration of Saint John Mary Vianney (Campos dos Goytacazes, Brazil)
- St. John Vianney Catholic Church and School (Barrie, Ontario, Canada)
- Societé Jean-Marie Vianney (SJMV), (Ars-sur-Formans, France)
- St. John Vianney's Church (Peshawar, Pakistan)
- Gereja Santo Yohanes Maria Vianney (CIlangkap, East Jakarta, Indonesia)
- Sekolah Vianney (Rawa Buaya, West Jakarta, Indonesia)
- Saint John Mary Vianney Academy (Antipolo, Rizal, Philippines)
- St. John Vianney Theological Seminary (Cagayan de Oro, Philippines)
- St. John Mary Vianney Centre (Seminary), (Colombo, Sri Lanka)
- St. Jean Vianney School (Baton Rouge, Louisiana, US)
- St. John Vianney Catholic Church, (Shelby Township, Michigan, US)
- St. John Vianney Catholic Church (Flint, Michigan, US)
- St. John Vianney Cure of Ars School (The Bronx, New York, US)
- St. John Vianney Catholic Church (Brookfield, Wisconsin, US)
- Saint John Vianney Theological Seminary (Denver, Colorado, US)
- St. John Vianney High School (Holmdel Township, New Jersey, US)
- St. John Vianney High School (Kirkwood, Missouri, US)
- St. John Vianney High School (Los Angeles, California, US)
- St. John Vianney College Seminary (Miami, Florida, US)
- St. John Vianney Catholic Church (St. Petersburg, Florida, US)
- Saint John Vianney School (Gallatin, Tennessee, US)
- St. John Vianney Catholic Church (Sedona, Arizona, US)
- Saint John Vianney Seminary (St. Paul, Minnesota, US)
- St. John Vianney Catholic Church and School (Spokane Valley, Washington, US)
- St. John Vianney Catholic Church (Cumberland, Rhode Island, US)
- St. John Vianney Catholic Church (Dublin, Ireland)
- Saint John Vianney School (Firswood, England, UK)
- Saint John Vianney Catholic Church & School (Rancho Cordova, California, US)
- Saint John Vianney Clergy Residence for Retired Priests (Riverdale, Bronx, New York, US)
- Saint John Vianney Catholic Church & St John Vianney R.C Primary School (Edinburgh, Scotland, UK)
- Saint John Vianney Catholic Church (Houston, Texas, US)
- St. John Vianney Catholic Church & School (San Jose, California, US)
- St. John Vianney Catholic Church (Hacienda Heights, California, US)
- Saint John Vianney Catholic Church & School (Northlake, Illinois, US)
- Saint John Vianney Catholic Church (Omaha, Nebraska, US)
- St. John Vianney Catholic School, Manchester, UK
- St John Vianney Church (West Green Road, Tottenham, London, England, UK)
- St. John Vianney Catholic Church (Belgrade, Montana)
- St. John Vianney Catholic Church (Bettendorf, Iowa)
- St. John Vianney Catholic Church & School (Janesville, Wisconsin)
- Vianney College, Wagga Wagga
- St. John Vianney Church and School (Colonia, NJ)
- Parish of Saint John Vianney, South Burlington, Vermont
- St John Vianney Catholic School, St Helens, Merseyside, UK

== See also ==
- Peter Julian Eymard
- Jean-Claude Colin
- Mathias Loras
- Saint John Vianney's prayer to Jesus
- André César Vermare
- Saint John Vianney, patron saint archive
