= Garry Wills bibliography =

External videos
- Booknotes interview with Wills on Under God: Religion and American Politics, December 30, 1990, C-SPAN
- Presentation by Wills on John Wayne's America, January 10, 1998, C-SPAN
- Presentation by Wills on A Necessary Evil, October 27, 1999, C-SPAN
- Washington Journal interview with Wills on Why I Am a Catholic, July 29, 2002, C-SPAN
- Presentation by Wills on Negro President, November 21, 2003, C-SPAN
- Presentation by Wills on Henry Adams and the Making of America, October 30, 2005, C-SPAN
- Presentation by Wills on Henry Adams and the Making of America, November 19, 2005, C-SPAN
- Presentation by Wills on Head and Heart, October 15, 2007, C-SPAN
- Presentation by Wills on What the Gospels Meant, June 7, 2008, C-SPAN
- After Words interview with Wills on Bomb Power, February 13, 2010, C-SPAN
- Presentation by Wills on Why Priests?, February 16, 2013, C-SPAN
- Presentation by Wills on The Future of the Catholic Church with Pope Francis, March 13, 2015, C-SPAN

List of works by or about Garry Wills, American historian and journalist.

- Wills, Garry (1961). Chesterton : man and mask. New York: Sheed & Ward.
- Animals of the Bible (1962)
- Politics and Catholic Freedom (1964)
- Roman Culture: Weapons and the Man (1966), ISBN 0-8076-0367-8
- The Second Civil War: Arming for Armageddon (1968)
- Jack Ruby (1968), ISBN 0-306-80564-2
- Nixon Agonistes: The Crisis of the Self-made Man (1970, 1979), ISBN 0-451-61750-9
- Bare Ruined Choirs: Doubt, Prophecy, and Radical Religion (1972), ISBN 0-385-08970-8
- Values Americans Live By (1973), ISBN 0-405-04166-7
- Inventing America: Jefferson's Declaration of Independence (1978), ISBN 0-385-08976-7
- Confessions of a Conservative (1979), ISBN 0-385-08977-5
- At Button's (1979), ISBN 0-8362-6108-9
- Explaining America: The Federalist (1981), ISBN 0-385-14689-2
- The Kennedy Imprisonment: A Meditation on Power (1982), ISBN 0-316-94385-1
- Lead Time: A Journalist's Education (1983), ISBN 0-385-17695-3
- Cincinnatus: George Washington and the Enlightenment (1984), ISBN 0-385-17562-0
- Reagan's America: Innocents at Home (1987), ISBN 0-385-18286-4
- Under God: Religion and American Politics (1990), ISBN 0-671-65705-4
- Lincoln at Gettysburg: The Words That Remade America (1992), ISBN 0-671-76956-1
- Certain Trumpets: The Call of Leaders (1994), ISBN 0-671-65702-X
- Witches and Jesuits: Shakespeare's Macbeth (1995), ISBN 0-19-508879-4
- John Wayne's America: The Politics of Celebrity (1997), ISBN 0-684-80823-4
- — (July 1997). "Dostoyevsky behind a camera : Oliver Stone is making great American novels on film". Movies. The Atlantic Monthly. 280 (1): 96–101.
- Saint Augustine (1999), ISBN 0-670-88610-6
- Saint Augustine's Childhood (2001), ISBN 0-670-03001-5
- Saint Augustine's Memory (2002), ISBN 0-670-03127-5
- Saint Augustine's Sin (2003), ISBN 0-670-03241-7
- Saint Augustine's Conversion (2004), ISBN 0-670-03352-9
- A Necessary Evil: A History of American Distrust of Government (1999), ISBN 0-684-84489-3
- Papal Sin: Structures of Deceit (2000), ISBN 0-385-49410-6
- Venice: Lion City: The Religion of Empire (2001), ISBN 0-684-87190-4
- Why I Am a Catholic (2002), ISBN 0-618-13429-8
- Mr. Jefferson's University (2002), ISBN 0-7922-6531-9
- James Madison (2002), ISBN 0-8050-6905-4
- Negro President: Jefferson and the Slave Power (2003), ISBN 0-618-34398-9
- Henry Adams and the Making of America (2005), ISBN 0-618-13430-1
- The Rosary: Prayer Comes Round (2005), ISBN 0-670-03449-5
- What Jesus Meant (2006), ISBN 0-670-03496-7
- What Paul Meant (2006), ISBN 0-670-03793-1
- Bush's Fringe Government (2006), ISBN 978-1590172100
- Head and Heart: American Christianities (2007), ISBN 978-1-59420-146-2
- What the Gospels Meant (2008), ISBN 0-670-01871-6
- Bomb Power: The Modern Presidency and the National Security State (2010), ISBN 978-1-59420-240-7
- Outside Looking In: Adventures of an Observer (2010), ISBN 978-0-670-02214-4
- Augustine's 'Confessions': A Biography (2011), ISBN 978-0691143576
- Verdi's Shakespeare: Men of the Theater (2011), ISBN 978-0670023042
- Rome and Rhetoric: Shakespeare's Julius Caesar (2011), ISBN 978-0300152180
- Font of Life: Ambrose, Augustine, and the Mystery of Baptism (2012), ISBN 978-0199768516
- Why Priests? (2013), ISBN 978-0670024872
- The Future of the Catholic Church with Pope Francis (March 2015), ISBN 978-0525426967
- What The Qur'an Meant and Why It Matters (2017), ISBN 978-1-101-98102-3
