= List of encyclicals of Pope John XXIII =

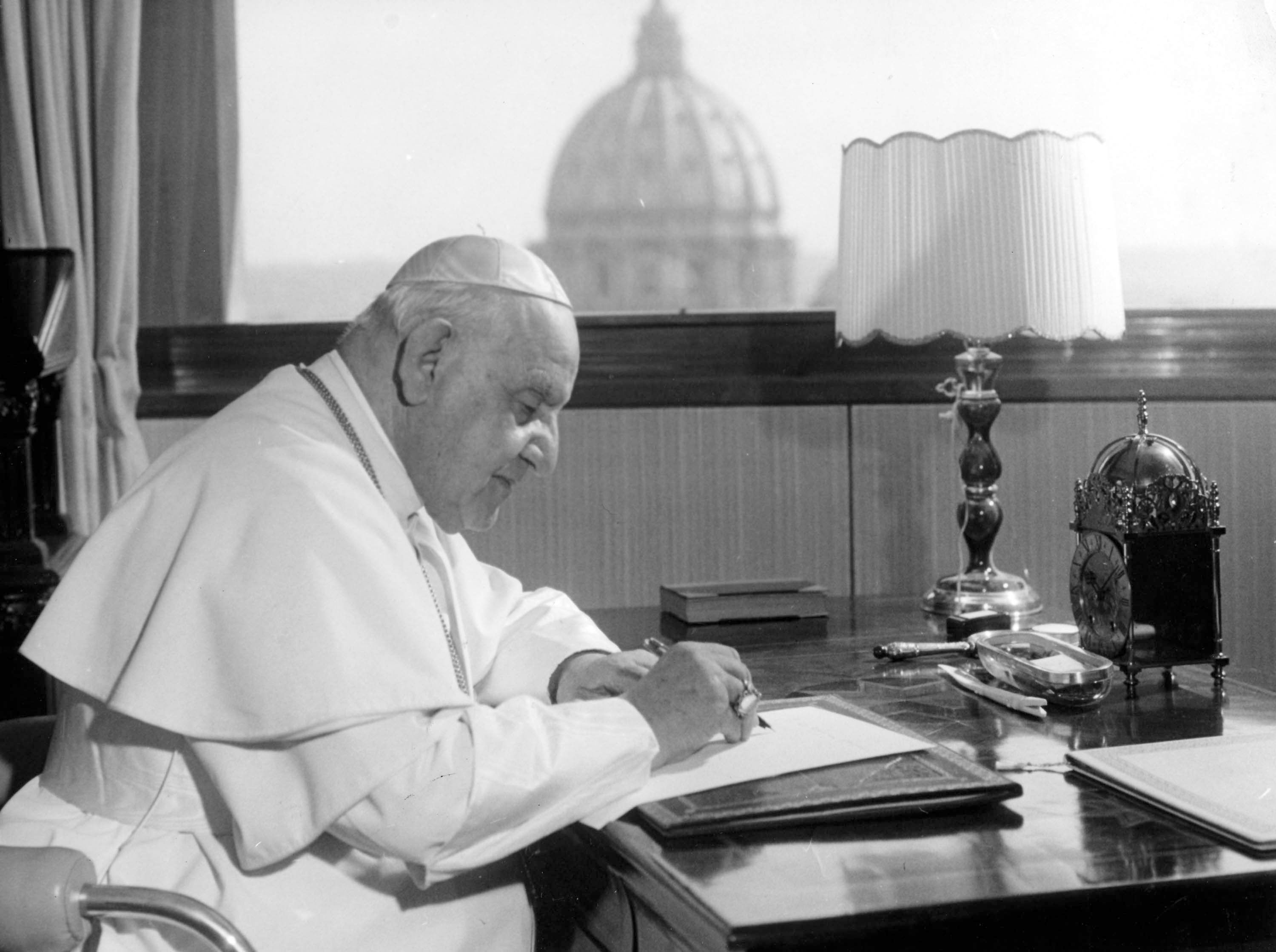
Pope John XXIII writing at his working desk

Pope John XXIII (1881–1963; reigned 1958–1963) issued eight papal encyclicals during his five-year tenure as pope of the Catholic Church. An encyclical is a letter issued by the pope that is usually addressed to Catholic bishops or laity in a particular area or of the whole world. Encyclicals may condemn errors, point out threats to faith and morals, exhort faithful practices or provide remedies for present and future dangers to the church. The authority of the encyclical varies depending on the circumstances on the content and is not necessarily infallible. The title of an encyclical is usually taken from its incipit (its first few words). Two of his encyclicals, Mater et magistra and Pacem in terris, have been regarded as being especially important.

John XXIII's first encyclical, Ad Petri Cathedram, was issued eight months into his pontificate and was neither an important social document nor doctrinal exposition. Instead it looked at truth, unity and peace with distinctive familiarity and concern. The second, Sacerdotii nostri primordia, commemorated the one hundredth anniversary of the death of John Vianney, while Grata recordatio considered the use of the Rosary. Princeps pastorum, his fourth encyclical, used 1 Peter 5:4 as its biblical text and celebrated Catholic missions.

Mater et magistra, the fifth encyclical, carried forward ideas from Leo XIII's Rerum novarum (1891), which had been issued 70 years earlier, as well as from Pius XI's Quadragesimo anno (1931). It considers social ethics with its most important point being the application of natural law to the international community. It is one of the longest encyclicals, at more than 25,000 words. The sixth encyclical, Aeterna Dei sapientia, commemorated the death of Pope Leo I and called for unity within Christendom from external movements such as communism and secularism. The penultimate encyclical, Paenitentiam agere, considered penance and the then-upcoming Second Vatican Council. John XXIII's final encyclical, Pacem in terris, was written two months before his death. It is long – at over 15,000 words – and was the first in history to have been addressed to "all men of good will", rather than only the clergy and laity of the church. It was hailed as "one of the most profound and significant documents of our age".

== Encyclicals ==
No.	Latin title	English translation	Subject	Date	Text
1	Ad Petri Cathedram	To the Chair of Peter	"On truth, unity and peace in a spirit of charity"	29 June 1959	English; Latin
2	Sacerdotii nostri primordia	From the Beginning of Our Priesthood	"On St. John Vianney"	1 August 1959	English; Latin
3	Grata recordatio	With Joyful Recollection	"On the rosary: prayer for the church, missions, international and social problems"	26 September 1959	English; Latin
4	Princeps pastorum	The Prince of the Shepherds	"On the missions, native clergy and lay participation"	28 November 1959	English; Latin
5	Mater et magistra	Mother and Teacher	"On Christianity and social progress"	15 May 1961	English; Latin
6	Aeterna Dei sapientia	God's Eternal Wisdom	"On commemorating the fifteenth centennial of the death of Pope St. Leo I"	11 November 1961	English; Latin
7	Paenitentiam agere	Penance for Sins	"On the need for the practice of interior and exterior penance"	1 July 1962	English; Latin
8	Pacem in terris	Peace on Earth	"On establishing universal peace in truth, justice, charity and liberty"	11 April 1963	English; Latin
