= Nostri =

Nostri may refer to:

- Arrivano i nostri is a 1951 comedy film.
- I nostri mariti is a 1966 comedy film.
- Membra Jesu Nostri is a cycle of seven cantatas composed by Dieterich Buxtehude in 1680.
- Protectores Augusti Nostri was a title given to individual officers of the Roman Army.
- Passio is a passion cantata by Arvo Pärt.
- Redemptoris nostri cruciatus is a peace encyclical of Pope Pius XII focusing on the war in Palestine
- Sacerdotii nostri primordia ("From the beginning of our priesthood") was the second encyclical issued by Pope John XXIII.
