= Aeterna Dei sapientia =

1961 encyclical on the unity of Christendom

Aeterna Dei sapientia Latin for 'God's eternal wisdom' Encyclical of Pope John XXIII
- Signature date: 11 November 1961
- Subject: the See of Peter as the centre of Christian unity
- Number: 6 of 8 of the pontificate
- Text: In Latin; In English

Aeterna Dei sapientia ("God's eternal wisdom") was the sixth encyclical made by Pope John XXIII, and was issued on 11 November 1961. It commemorates the fifteenth centennial of the death of Pope Leo I, also known as Leo the Great and a Doctor of the Church. It calls for Christian unity. It calls for Christendom to unite against external movements such as communism and secularism.

== Content ==
The encyclical begins by telling a history of Pope Leo, briefly referencing his life before becoming pope, then going into greater detail about his papacy. John talks of his refutation of heresy, particularly Pelagianism and Nestorianism, and his support of Catholic orthodoxy, such as his defense of Catholic teaching on the Incarnation of Christ. John then puts Leo's papacy in the context of the upcoming Second Vatican Council. He called for the Catholic Church to be united during the council, saying "Surrounding the Roman Pontiff and in close communion with him, you, the Bishops, will present to the world a wonderful spectacle of Catholic unity." He then mentions the doctrine of the infallibility of the church promulgated by his predecessor, Pope Pius IX, and discusses the development of the modern understanding of the papacy. He cites Pope Leo as one of those popes who furthered papal authority over the church. After more discussion of the Magisterium and the council, John concludes by acknowledging the division present in the church, invoking Pope Leo, and once more calling for unity.

== See also ==
- List of encyclicals of Pope John XXIII
