= Mater si, magistra no =

Slogan regarding Catholic social teaching

Mater si, magistra no (English: "Mother yes, teacher no") is a macaronic phrase suggesting that Catholics need not follow all the teachings of the Catholic Church, particularly in regard to economic justice or the rights of workers. It was originally formulated in direct response to Pope John XXIII's encyclical letter Mater et Magistra in 1961, as a reference to the anti-Castro slogan, "Cuba sí, Castro no".

== History ==
The original use was focused on the Church's 1960s teachings on social policy, as expressed by the encyclical Mater et magistra, but Roman Catholic publications such as the New Oxford Review and the National Catholic Reporter have described it as a slogan for "'pick-and-choose Catholicism" or for those who have a "deep love for the faith and tradition, coupled with skepticism about ecclesiastical authority and its claims to special wisdom".

The phrase is often attributed to William F. Buckley, Jr; although its first use in print was in Buckley's National Review, the phrase was actually coined by Garry Wills during a telephone conversation with Buckley.

Russell Shaw says the phrase "helped set the stage for the self-righteous dismissals that greeted the 1968 publication of Pope Paul VI's encyclical Humanae Vitae", and later Pope Francis's Laudato si' on the environment. It became the expression of a knee-jerk antipathy to church teaching [which] spread to other areas where dissenters happened not to like what was taught.

== Cultural impact ==
- When Commonweal published Eamon Duffy's negative review of Garry Wills' 2000 book Papal Sin, the caption on the front cover read, "Mater Si, Wills No".
- National Review editor Priscilla Buckley subsequently regretted having published the phrase, stating in 2005 that it had "got [National Review] into lots and lots of trouble ... over lots and lots of years".
