= Grata recordatio =

1959 papal encyclical by John XXIII

Grata recordatio Latin for 'With joyful recollection' Encyclical of Pope John XXIII
- Signature date: 26 September 1959
- Subject: Praying the Rosary
- Number: 3 of 8 of the pontificate
- Text: In Latin; In English

Grata recordatio ('With joyful recollection') was the third encyclical issued by Pope John XXIII, and was issued on 26 September 1959. It urges the use of the Rosary in the month of October following the tradition to do so by Pope Leo XIII. In it he recalled the "pleasant memory" of hearing those encyclicals read every October.

== See also ==
- List of encyclicals of Pope John XXIII

== Sources ==
- text on Vatican website.
