= St. John Vianney Catholic Church =

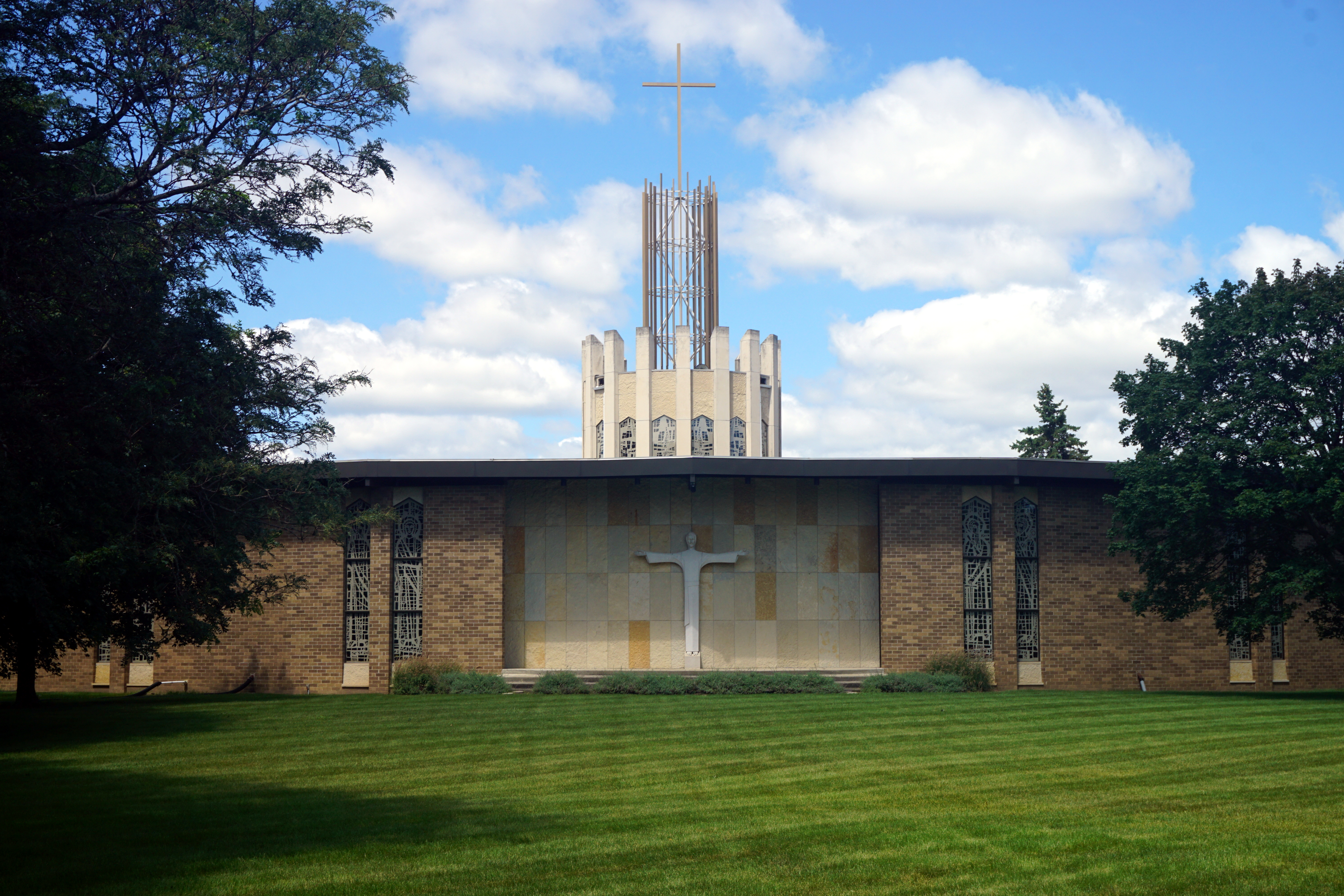

- 43.0543°N 88.1293°W
- Country: United States
- Denomination: Catholic
- Website: stjohnv.org/parish

Clergy
- Pastor: Father John LoCoco

St. John Vianney Catholic Church is a large parish in Brookfield, Waukesha County, Wisconsin, United States, and is part of the Greater Milwaukee area. St. John Vianney Catholic Church is part of the Roman Catholic Archdiocese of Milwaukee.

== School ==
The parish operates St. John Vianney School.

St. John Vianney Catholic School

Information
- Principal: Kathy Davis
- Grades: K3 to 8th
- Enrollment: 300 students (2022)

== Patron saint ==
Jean Vianney was a French parish priest who became a Catholic saint and the patron saint of parish priests.
