= Penance in the Catholic Church =

One of the seven sacraments of the Catholic Church

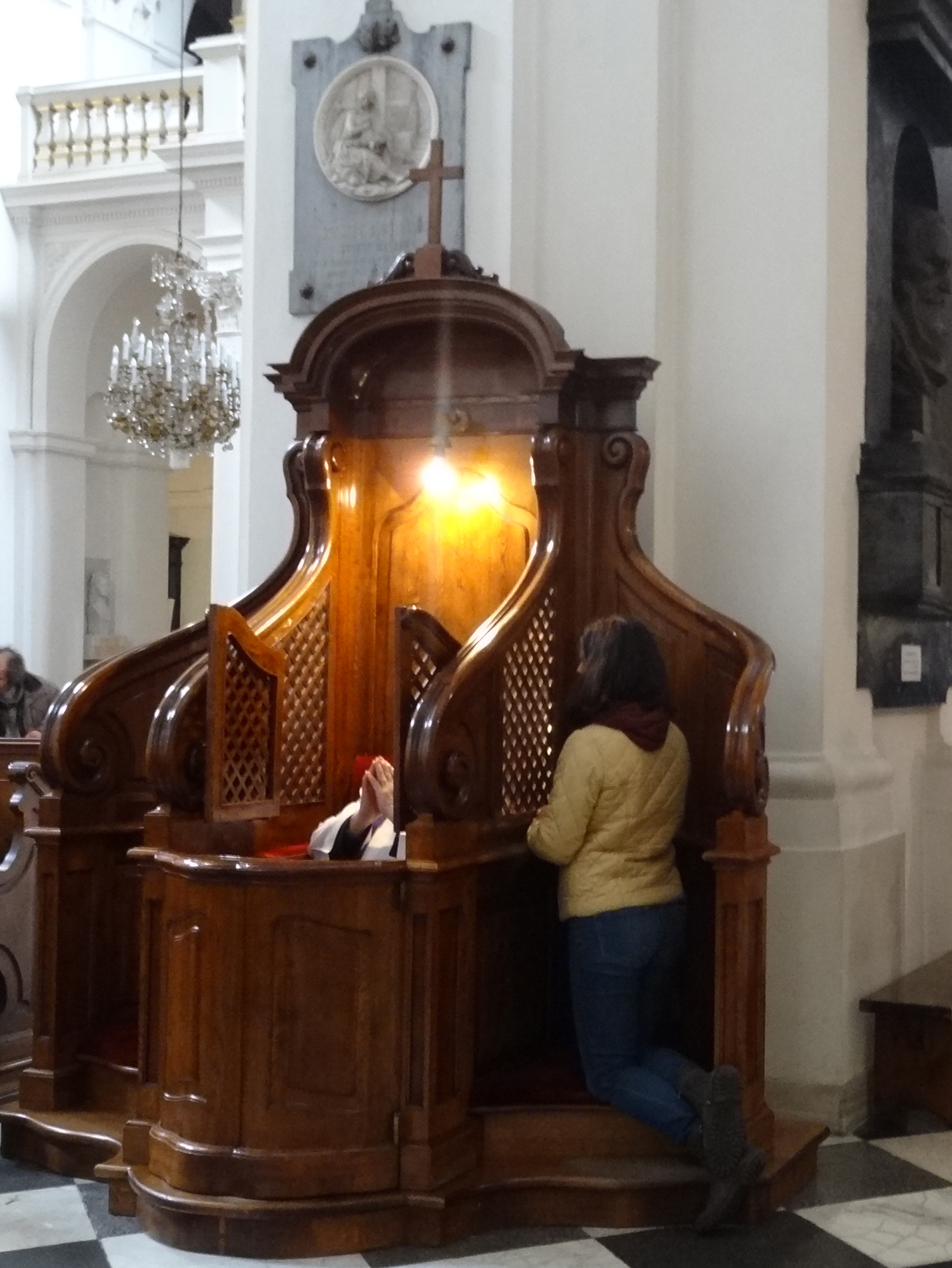
Confession (2023)

The sacrament of penance (Note: "Sacrament of Penance" is the name used in the Catholic Church's 1983 Code of Canon Law. The Catechism of the Catholic Church uses a broader range of nomenclature, calling it the "Sacrament of Penance and Reconciliation", and giving the additional alternative names of "Conversion", "Confession", and "Forgiveness".) (also commonly called the sacrament of reconciliation or confession) is one of the seven sacraments of the Catholic Church (known in Eastern Christianity as sacred mysteries). Through this sacrament, the faithful are absolved of sins committed after baptism and reconciled with the Christian community. During reconciliation, mortal sins must be confessed for the sacrament to be valid and, while not strictly required, venial sins may also be confessed for devotional reasons. According to the Church’s dogma and constant practice, only ordained priests may grant absolution. The Council of Trent also taught that absolution in the sacrament of penance is not merely a declaration that sins are forgiven, but is a judicial act exercised by a priest with proper authority over the penitent. (Note: The Council of Trent anathematized the contrary position in Canon IX of Session XIV: “If any one saith, that the sacramental absolution of the priest is not a judicial act, but a bare ministry of pronouncing and declaring sins to be forgiven to him who confesses... let him be anathema.”)

== History ==
In the New Testament, Christians are admonished to "confess your sins to one another and pray for one another" at their gatherings, and to be forgiving people. In the Gospel of John, Jesus says to the Apostles, after being raised from the dead, "Receive the Holy Spirit. Whose sins you forgive, they are forgiven; and whose sins you shall retain, they are retained". The early Church Fathers understood that the power of forgiving and retaining sins was communicated to the Apostles and to their lawful successors, the bishops and priests, for the reconciling of the faithful who have fallen after baptism.

=== Early practice ===
In the middle of the 2nd century, the idea of one reconciliation/penance after baptism for the serious sins of apostasy, murder, and adultery is suggested in the book of visions, The Shepherd of Hermas. The episkopos (bishop) was the main liturgical leader in a local community. He declared that God had forgiven the sins when it was clear that there was repentance, evidenced by the performance of some penance, and the penitent was readmitted to the community.

In the 1st and 2nd centuries of Christianity, penance was likely a public act. However, by the time of Cyprian of Carthage, confession itself was no longer public, specifically in cases of private sins such as having entertained thoughts of denying the faith under persecution. Basil of Caesarea similarly made concessions whereby adultery could be forgiven in private confession. With the additional influence of the monastic practice of "disclosure of thoughts" (logismoi), private confession to a priest became dominant by the 5th century.

Lifelong penance was required at times, but from the early fifth century for most serious sins, public penance came to be seen as a sign of repentance. At Maundy Thursday excluded serious sinners, especially now-repentant excommunicated individuals, were readmitted to the community and communion along with catechumens. This practice was still current in the late medieval period, for example the Use of Sarum, but lapsed with the Reformation and Counter-Reformation. Confusion entered in from deathbed reconciliation with the church, which required no penance as a sign of repentance, and the ritual would begin to grow apart from the reality.

Beginning in the 4th century, with the Roman Empire becoming Christian, bishops became judges, and sin was seen as breaking of the law rather than as fracturing one's relationship with God. A new, more legalistic understanding of penance emerged at episcopal courts, where it became payment to satisfy the demands of divine justice. According to Joseph Martos, this was facilitated by a misreading of John 20:23 and Matthew 18:18 by Augustine of Hippo and Pope Leo I, who thought it was the "disciple" and not God who did the forgiving, though only after true repentance. The acts of councils from the fourth to the sixth century show that no one who belonged to the order of penitents had access to Eucharistic communion until the bishop reconciled him with the community of the church. Canon 29 of the Council of Epaone (517) in Gaul says that from among penitents only apostates had to leave Sunday assembly together with catechumens before the Eucharistic part commenced. Other penitents were present until the end but were denied communion at the altar of the Lord.

A new approach to the practice of penance first became evident in the 7th century in the acts of the Council of Chalon-sur-Saône (644–655). Bishops gathered in that council were convinced that it was useful for the salvation of the faithful when the diocesan bishop prescribed penance to a sinner as many times as they would fall into sin (canon 8).

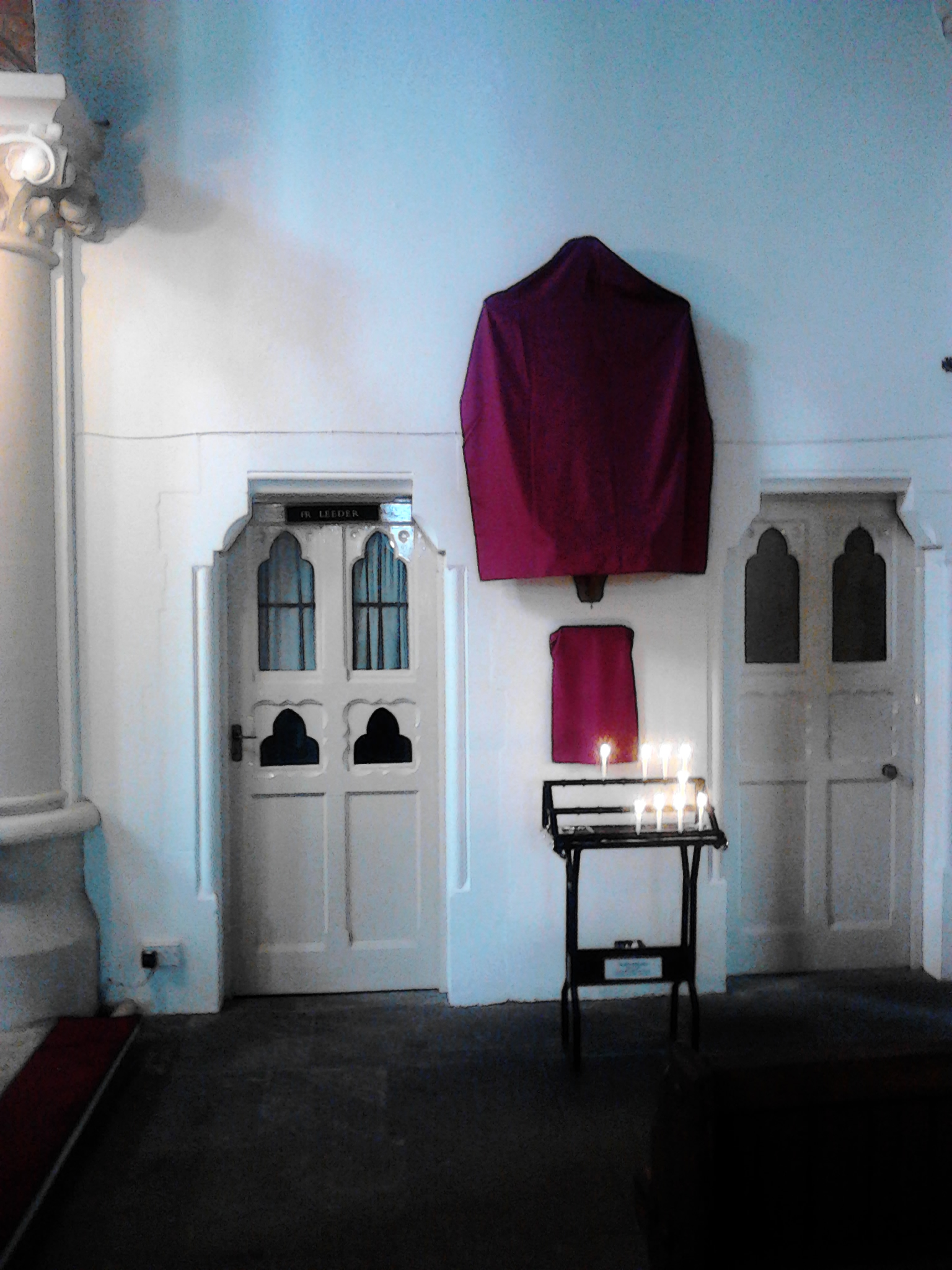
Functional 19th century confessionals in St Pancras Church, Ipswich

=== Celtic influence ===
Because of its isolation, the Celtic Church for centuries remained fixed with its forms of worship and penitential discipline which differed from the rest of the Christian Church. It had no knowledge of the institution of a public penance in the community of the church which could not be repeated, and which involved canonical obligations. Celtic penitential practices consisted of confession, acceptance of satisfaction fixed by the priest, and finally reconciliation. They date back to 6th century.

Penitential books native to the islands provided precisely determined penances for all offences, small and great (an approach reminiscent of early Celtic civil and criminal law). Walter J. Woods holds that "over time the penitential books helped suppress homicide, personal violence, theft, and other offenses that damaged the community and made the offender a target for revenge." The practice of so-called tariff penance was brought to continental Europe from Ireland, Scotland and England by Hiberno-Scottish and Anglo-Saxon monks.

The Celtic practice led to new theories about the nature of God's justice, about temporal punishment God imposes on sin, about a treasury of merits in heaven to pay the debt of this punishment, and finally about indulgences to offset that debt.

=== Late Middle Ages ===
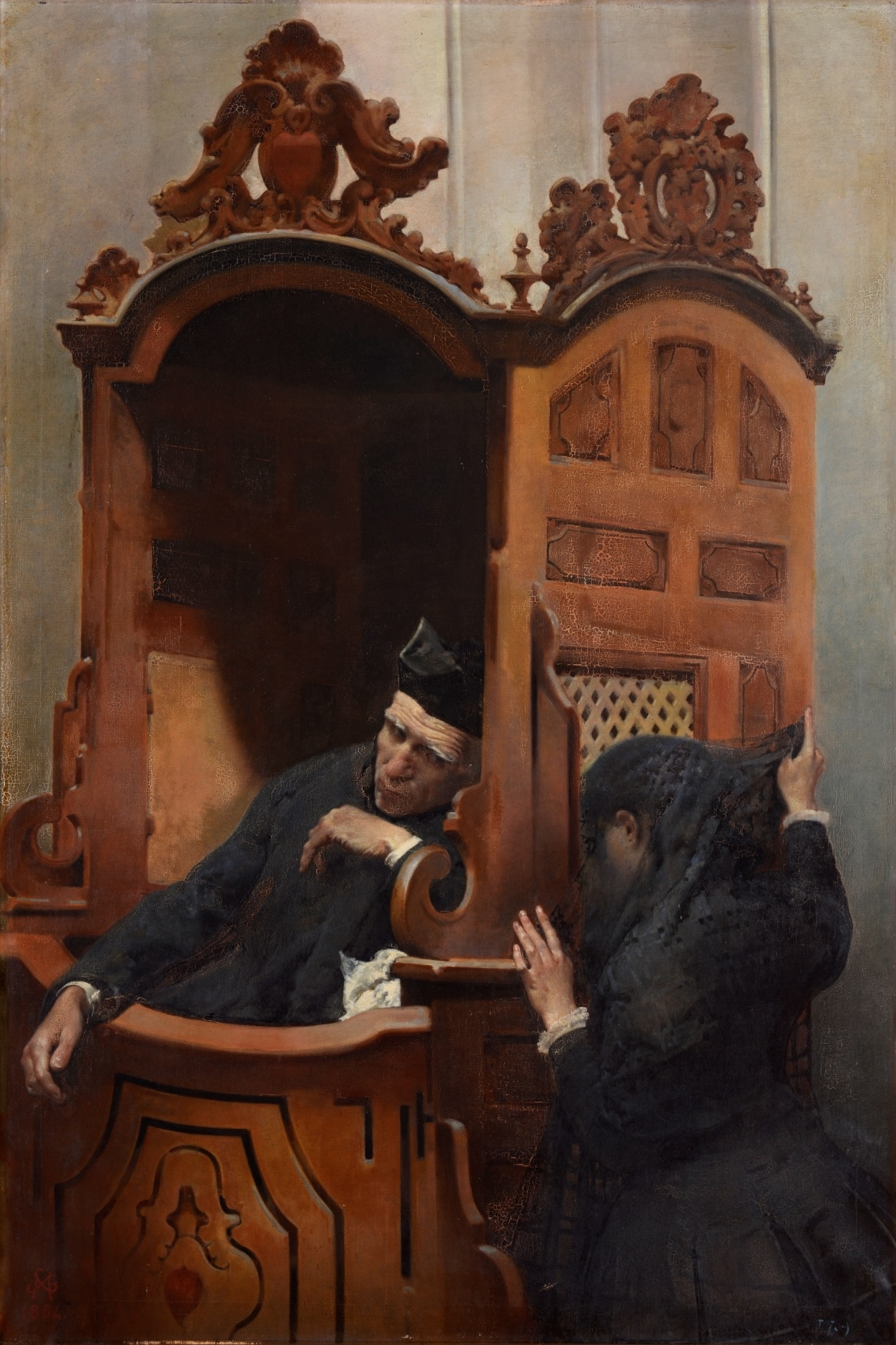
García Martínez, The Penitent (1884)

With the spread of scholastic philosophy, the question arose as to what caused the remission of sins. From the early 12th century Peter Abelard and Peter Lombard reflected the practice that contrition and confession (even to laymen or, in rare cases, a nun or beguine) assured of God's forgiveness, but remorse for one's sins was necessary. Absolution referred only to the punishment due to sin. But at this time Hugh of St. Victor taught on the basis of the "power of the keys" (John 20:23 and Matthew 18:18) that absolution applied not to the punishment but to the sins, and this hastened the end to lay confession.

From the third century on, a private form of confession that bishops finally put a stop to by the Fourth Lateran Council (1215) that made confession to a priest obligatory within a year of the sinning, and has enshrined the practice of private confession ever since. In the 13th century the Dominican philosopher Thomas Aquinas tried to reunite the personal "matter" (contrition, confession, satisfaction) and ecclesial "form" (absolution). But the Franciscan Duns Scotus gave support to the prevalent opinion at the time that absolution was the only essential element of the sacrament, which readmitted the penitent to the Eucharist.

In the 11th and 12th centuries a new, legalistic theory of penances had crept in, as satisfying the divine justice and paying the penalty for the "temporal punishment due to sin". This was followed by a new theory of a treasury of merits which was first put forward around 1230. As a means of paying this penalty, the practice grew of granting indulgences for various good works, drawing on "the treasury of the Church's merits". These indulgences later began to be "sold" (i.e., made conditional for the wealthy on some approved alms-giving), leading to Martin Luther's dramatic protest.

=== Since the Council of Trent ===
In the mid-16th century the bishops at the Council of Trent retained the private approach to the Sacrament of Reconciliation and decreed that indulgences could not be sold. Some Protestant Reformers retained the sacrament as sign but shorn of Canonical accretions. However, for Catholics after Trent "the confession of mortal sins would be primarily regarded as a matter of divine law supported by the ecclesiastical law to confess these within a year after they had been committed".

The problem that "has dominated the entire history of the sacrament of reconciliation [...] is the determination of the roles of the subjective and personal factors and the objective and ecclesiastical factor in penance". From the mid-19th century, historical and biblical studies called to mind that repentance is required before God can forgive sins and the sinner can be readmitted to the Christian community through the sacrament. Sacramental theology had always taught that contrition was necessary for a valid confession. The Second Vatican Council (1962–1965) decreed in its Constitution on the Sacred Liturgy that the "rite and formulas for the sacrament of penance [were] to be revised so that they more clearly express both the nature and effect of the sacrament". In a post-conciliar document, The Constitution on Penance, Pope Paul VI emphasized "the intimate relationship between external act and internal conversion, prayer, and works of charity".

=== Sacrament of reconciliation in pandemics ===
On March 20, 2020, the Apostolic Penitentiary issued a note on clarifications regards the Sacrament of Reconciliation in the COVID-19 pandemic. In particular it was noted that where it is impossible for the faithful to receive sacramental absolution, forgiveness for sins (even grave ones) may be obtained by perfect contrition and the believer's firm intention to make a sacramental confession as soon as possible.

== Contemporary confessional practice ==
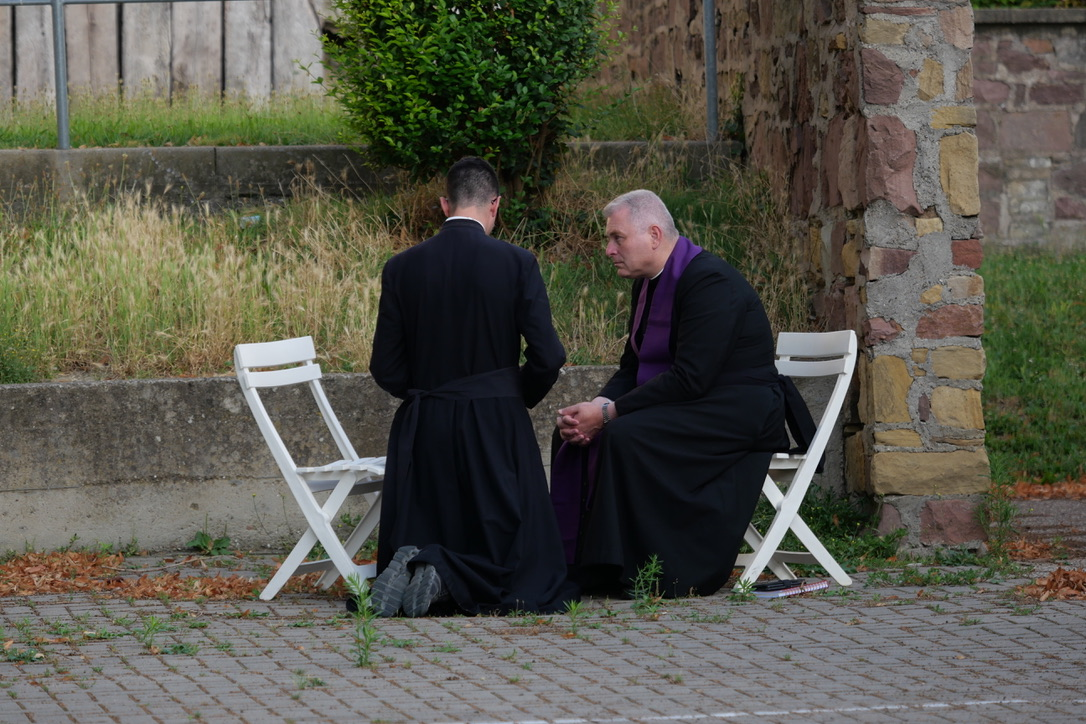
Confession of a priest to a priest, France, Community of Saint Martin (2024)

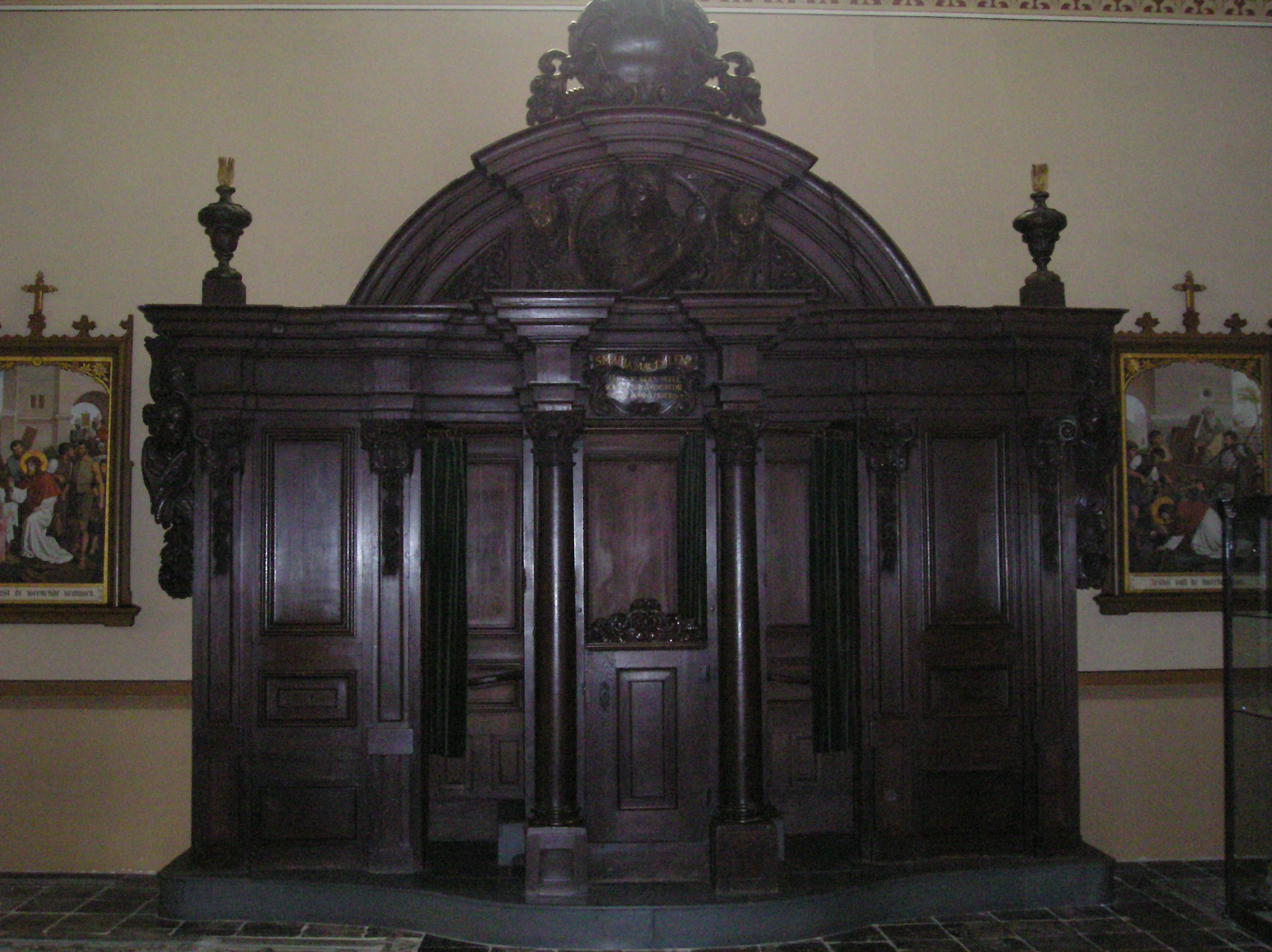
Confessional, Netherlands (2007)

Canon law requires confession along with purpose of amendment and absolution from the priest for all grave sins for reconciliation with God and with the Catholic Church, except in danger of death.

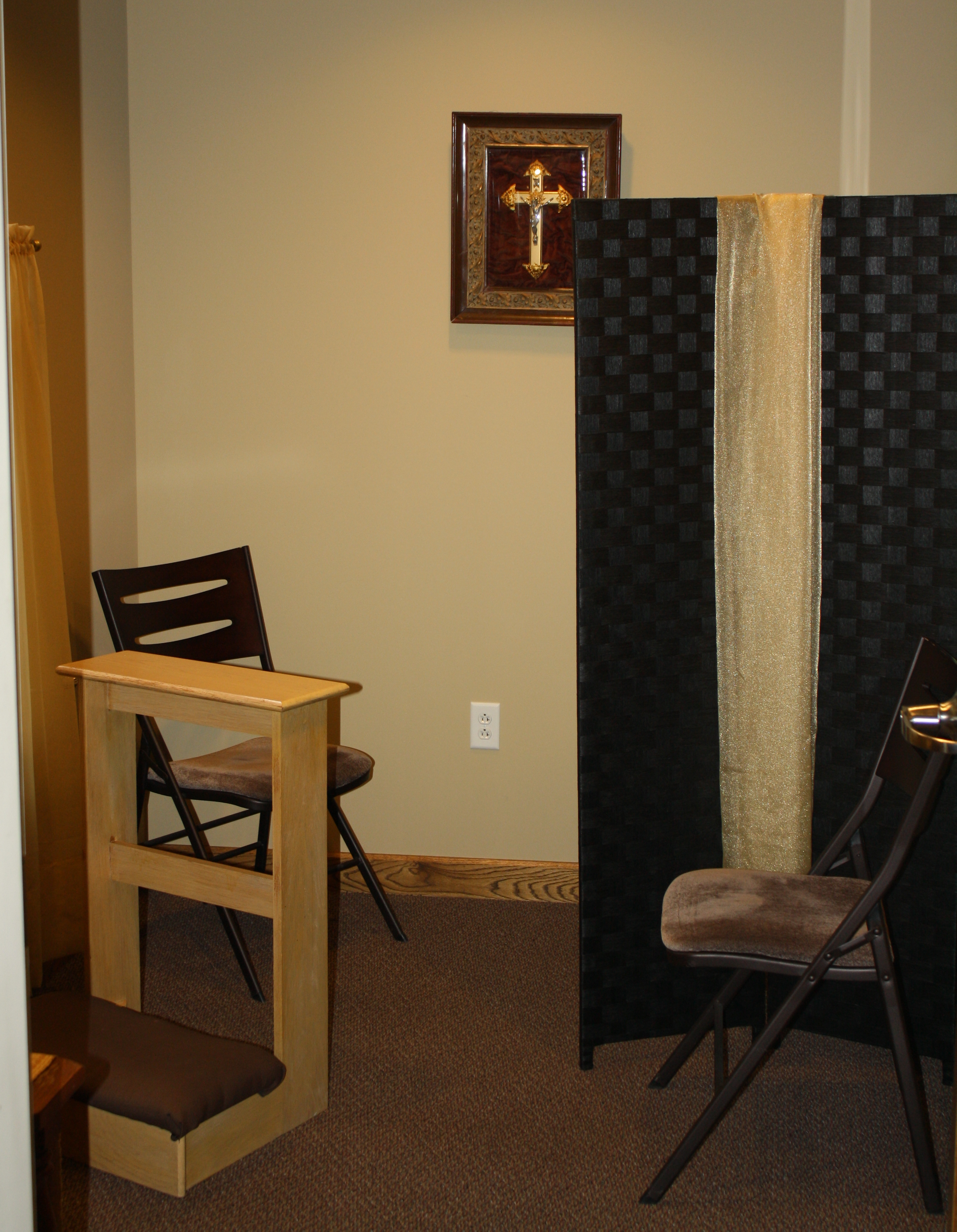
Confessional with three options for penitent; priest behind screen (Missouri, USA, 2019)

Especially in the West, the penitent may choose to confess in a specially constructed confessional. Since the Second Vatican Council, besides the previous practice of kneeling behind a screen, the option of sitting facing the priest has been added in most confessionals. For those who prefer anonymity, the provision of an opaque screen separating the priest from the penitent is still required.

The priest administering a sacrament, such as Reconciliation, must have permission from the local bishop, or from his religious superior. However in urgent need any ordained priest may grant absolution to a penitent.

=== Rite ===
The current Rite of Penance was produced in 1973 with two options for reconciliation services, to restore the original meaning of sacraments as community signs. The 1983 Code of Canon Law brought some further changes. The penitent may kneel on the kneeler or sit in a chair (not shown), facing the priest. The current book on the Rite of Penance prescribes the following (42–47). The sign of the cross precedes a greeting of encouragement to trust in God. The priest may read a short passage from the Bible that proclaims God's mercy and calls to conversion. All mortal sins must be confessed, while confession of venial sins also is recommended but not required. The priest may emphasize repentance and offer counsel, and always proposes a penance which the penitent accepts and then recites an act of contrition. The priest imparts absolution. Since the Council of Trent, the essential words of absolution have been: "I absolve you from your sins in the name of the Father, and of the Son, and of the Holy Spirit." (Note: Prior to 1973, the formula of absolution contained in the 1614 Ordo ministrandi sacramentum poenitentiae was (in English translation): "May our Lord Jesus Christ absolve you: and I by his authority absolve you from every bond of excommunication, suspension and interdict, insofar as I am able and you need it. And finally, I absolve you from your sins, in the name of the Father, and of the Son, and of the Holy Spirit. Amen." Stafford pointed out that the first part "was legal and canonical in its inspiration and wording" while the 1973 formula "is more explicitly biblical, ecclesial, Christocentric, and Trinitarian.") In the renewal of the sacrament the more ample form is:

God, the Father of mercies, through the death and resurrection of his Son has reconciled the world to himself and sent the Holy Spirit among us for the forgiveness of sins. Through the ministry of the Church may God give you pardon and peace. And I absolve you from your sins in the name of the Father, and of the Son, and of the Holy Spirit.

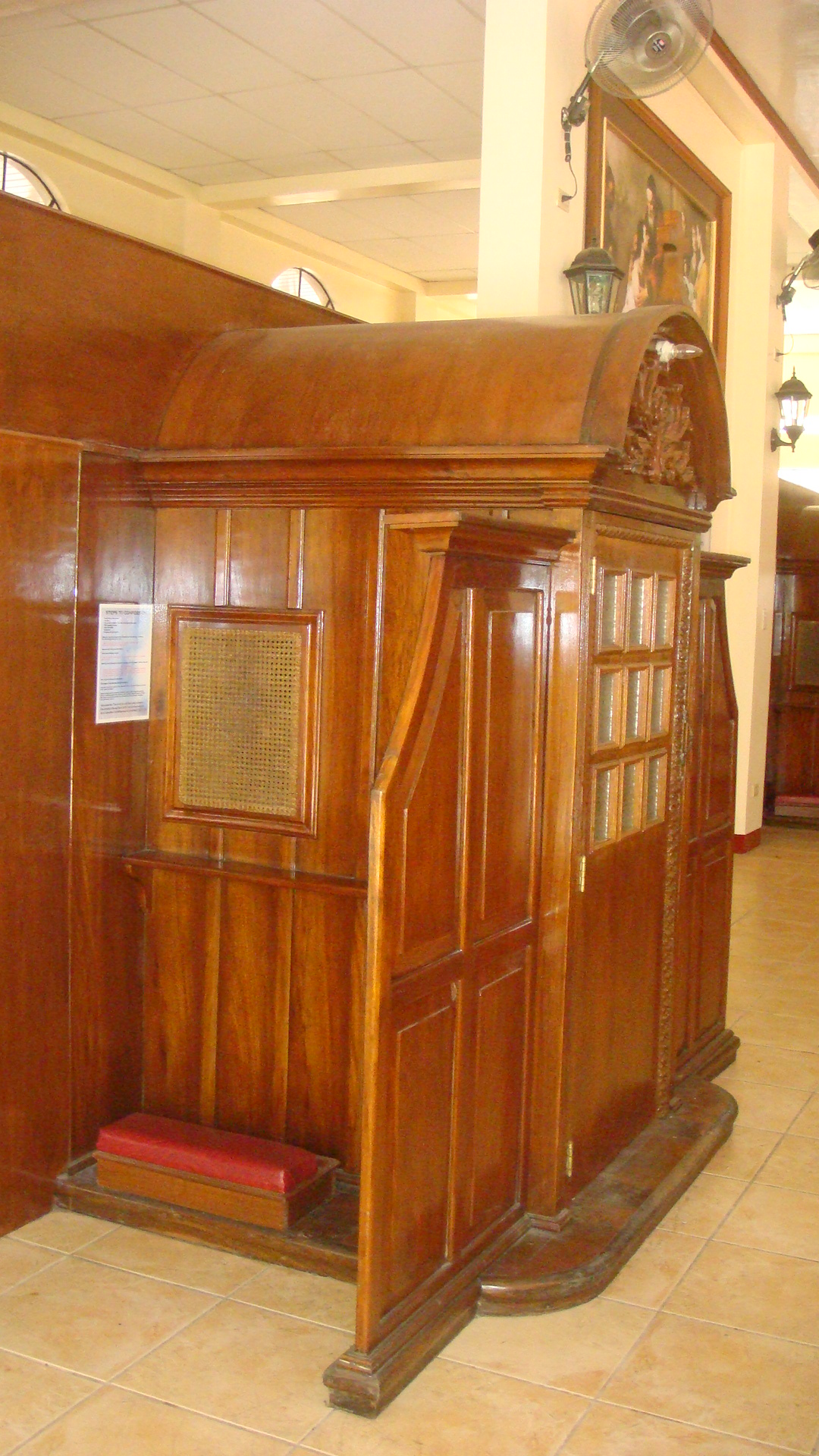
Simple confession box, Manaoag Church.

Finally, the priest invites the penitent to "give thanks to the Lord, for he is good", to which the penitent responds, "His mercy endures forever" (Psalms 136:1). The priest dismisses the penitent "in peace".

Before the absolution, the penitent makes an act of contrition, a prayer declaring sorrow for sin. While older forms might only mention sin as offence against God, newer forms mention harm done to one's neighbor.

Since the Second Vatican Council, reconciliation services have been encouraged, to emphasize the communal element in the sacrament. Such services include readings from scripture, a homily, and prayers, followed by individual confession. In extenuating circumstances where general absolution is given, true repentance is still required and individual confession at some opportune time. Such circumstances include where large numbers are in danger of death, or are deprived of the sacrament by grave lack of priests, but not simply from the number of penitents at major feasts or pilgrimages. By official declaration, one day is a sufficiently "long time" to justify use of the Third Rite, a reconciliation service with absolution, but requiring individual confession after. The Catholic Church teaches that individual and integral confession and absolution (as opposed to collective absolution) is the only ordinary way in which a person conscious of mortal sins committed after baptism can be reconciled with God and the church.

Although spiritual direction is not necessarily connected with the sacrament, the sacrament of penance has throughout the centuries been one of its main settings, enabling the Christian to become sensitive to God's presence, deepen the personal relationship with Christ, and attend to the action of the Spirit in one's life. In the 20th century, during the Second Vatican Council, new approaches were taken in the presentation of this sacrament, taking into account the concern of scrupulosity, or the exaggerated obsessive concern for detail. This further distinguished the role of penance from forms of psychotherapy.

=== Necessity and frequency ===
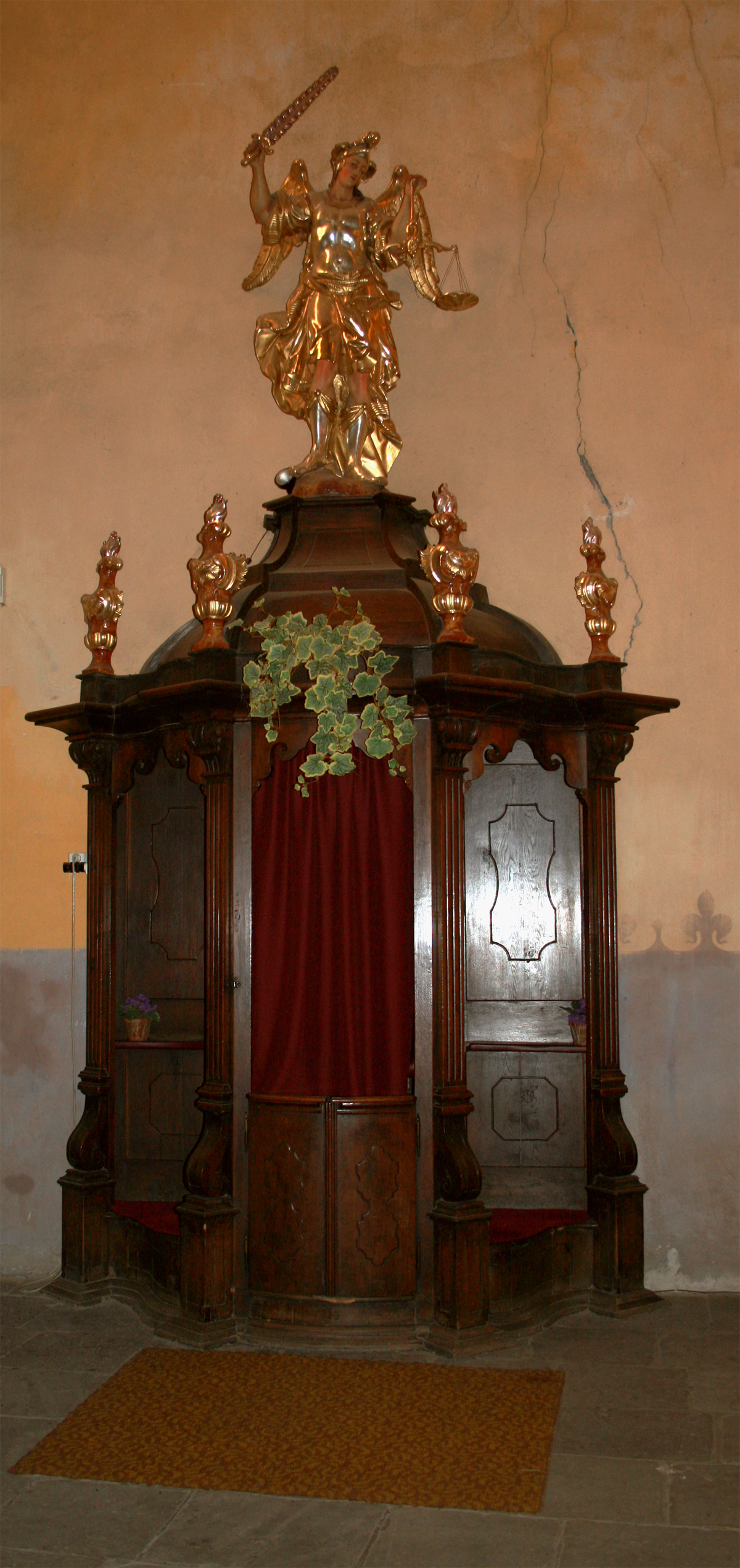
A confessional in the Bohemian style, in Jaroměř, Czech Republic.

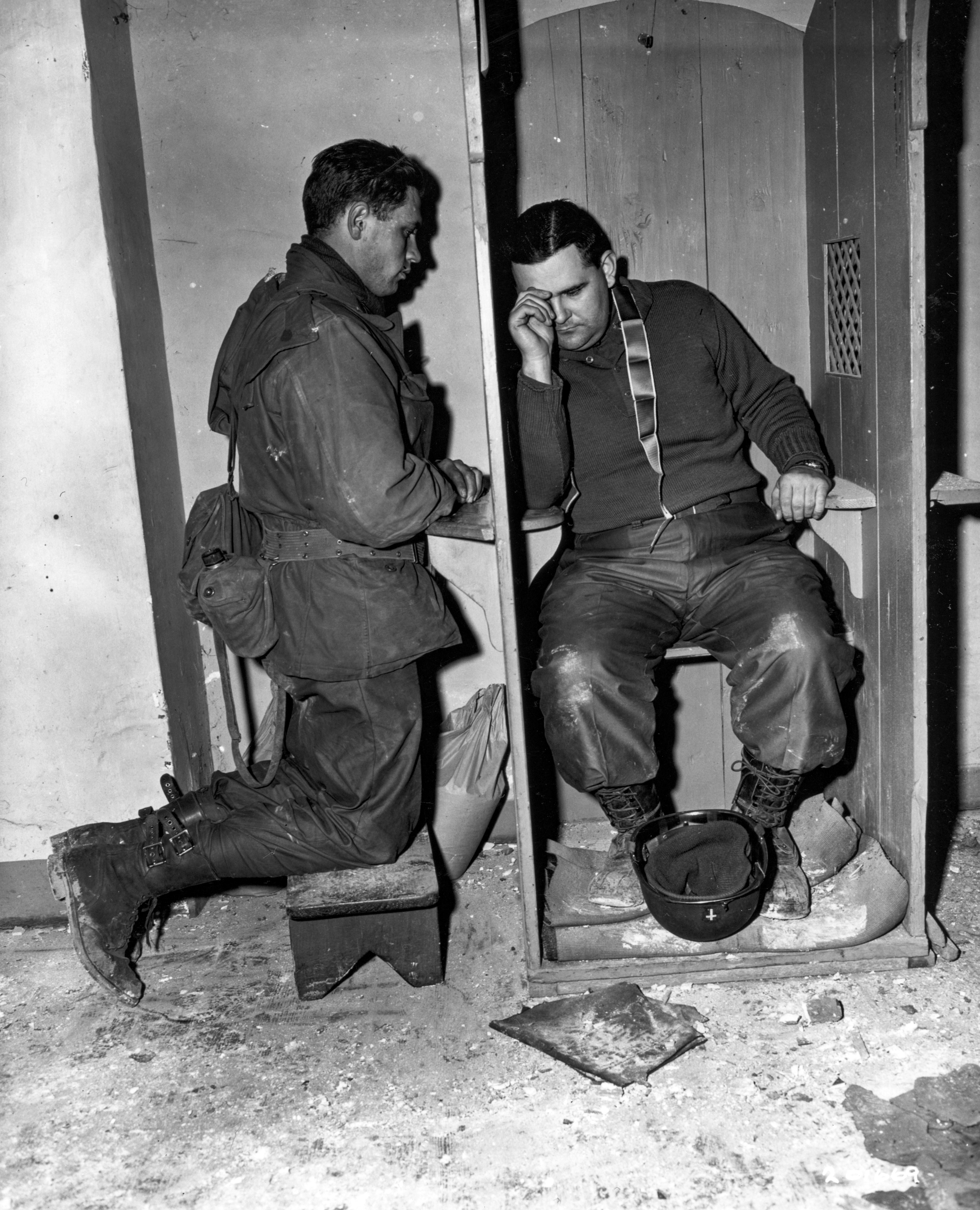
Confession to an American military chaplain in Germany (1945)

After having reached the age of discretion, each member of the faithful is obliged to confess faithfully their grave sins at least once a year. This yearly confession is necessitated for performing one's "Easter duty", the reception of Communion at least once during the Easter season. This must be preceded by Reconciliation if one has sinned gravely. Grave sin involves serious matter, sufficient knowledge of its seriousness, and sufficient freedom from any interior or exterior factors that would mitigate one's responsibility for the harm done. While private confession of all grave sins is now required, confession of venial sins is recommended but not required. Popes have written on the possible benefits of "devotional confession" of venial sins for strengthening of resolutions, divine encouragement, Christian growth, and interior peace.

All contrition implies sorrow of spirit and "detestation for the sin committed, together with the resolution not to sin again." Such contrition is "perfect" if it flows from divine charity but "imperfect" if it flows only from fear of penalties or of eternal damnation. While perfect contrition forgives serious sin, one must also have the intention to fulfill church teaching and confess the sin if or when it becomes possible. (Note: "Perfect contrition" is understood to remove the guilt of mortal sin even before confession or, if there is no opportunity of confessing to a priest, without confession, but with the intention of confessing when and if the opportunity arrives. Perfect contrition began as a description of sorrow that proceeded from abhorrence of the sin and not just from fear of punishment. Its description in Canon Law reads rather that it involves a sorrow "motivated by love of God". "The necessity [of the sacrament of penance] is like that of baptism: in an emergency, desire for the sacrament," according to Karl Rahner, "can replace it." Council of Trent, Session 6, decreed that repentance includes "sacramental confession or at least the desire to confess them when a suitable occasion will be found" while "eternal punishment [and] guilt, is remitted by the reception of the sacrament or the desire of the sacrament.")

In order for the sacrament of penance to be validly celebrated, the penitent must confess all mortal sins. If the penitent knowingly conceal any mortal sin, then the confession is invalid and the penitent incurs another sin: sacrilege. A person who has knowingly concealed a mortal sin must confess the sin he has concealed, mention the sacraments he has received since that time, and confess all the mortal sins he has committed since his last good confession. If the penitent forgets to confess a mortal sin in confession, the sacrament is valid and their sins are forgiven, but he must tell the mortal sin in the next confession if it again comes to his mind.

=== Sacramental seal ===
The sacramental seal binds all those who hear or overhear a penitent confess a sin for the purpose of absolution, to not reveal the identity of the penitent and the sin. Those who may overhear sins confessed, such as an interpreter, are bound by the same seal as the priest. A priest who violates this seal is automatically excommunicated, with pardon reserved to the Holy See. Others who violate the seal may also be excommunicated. Careless speaking that might lead people to connect a specific penitent with a sin confessed is also punishable.

While there have been martyrs who have been executed for refusing to break the seal, such as John of Nepomuk, in the United States the inviolability of the seal is recognized before the law.

=== Spiritual meaning ===
The church teaches, based on the Parable of the Prodigal Son, that confession is not a tribunal or criminal court, where one is condemned by God like a criminal, but a "wedding banquet hall, where the community celebrates Easter, Christ's victory over sin and death, in the joyful experience of his forgiving mercy." In confession, the church believes, God judges a person in the sense of bringing to light their sins, by granting the person the ability to confess their sins to the confessor, then grants the person repentance and, through the confessor, grants the person forgiveness. God's forgiveness restores the person to "the brightness of the white robe of baptism, a garment specifically required to participate in the [wedding] feast."

== Manuals of confession ==
Beginning in the Middle Ages, manuals of confession emerged as a literary genre. These manuals were guidebooks on how to obtain the maximum benefits from the sacrament. There were two kinds of manuals: those addressed to the faithful, so that they could prepare a good confession, and those addressed to the priests, who had to make sure that no sins were left unmentioned and the confession was as thorough as possible. The priest had to ask questions, while being careful not to suggest sins that perhaps the faithful had not thought of and give them ideas. Manuals were written in Latin and in the vernacular.

Such manuals grew more popular as the printed word spread, and in 2011 had made a transition to electronic form as well. The first such app on the iPhone to receive a bishop's approval was mistakenly reported as an app for the sacrament itself; in reality the app was an electronic version of this long-standing tradition of material to be used in preparing oneself to make a good confession.

== Eastern Christianity and perspectives on renewal ==
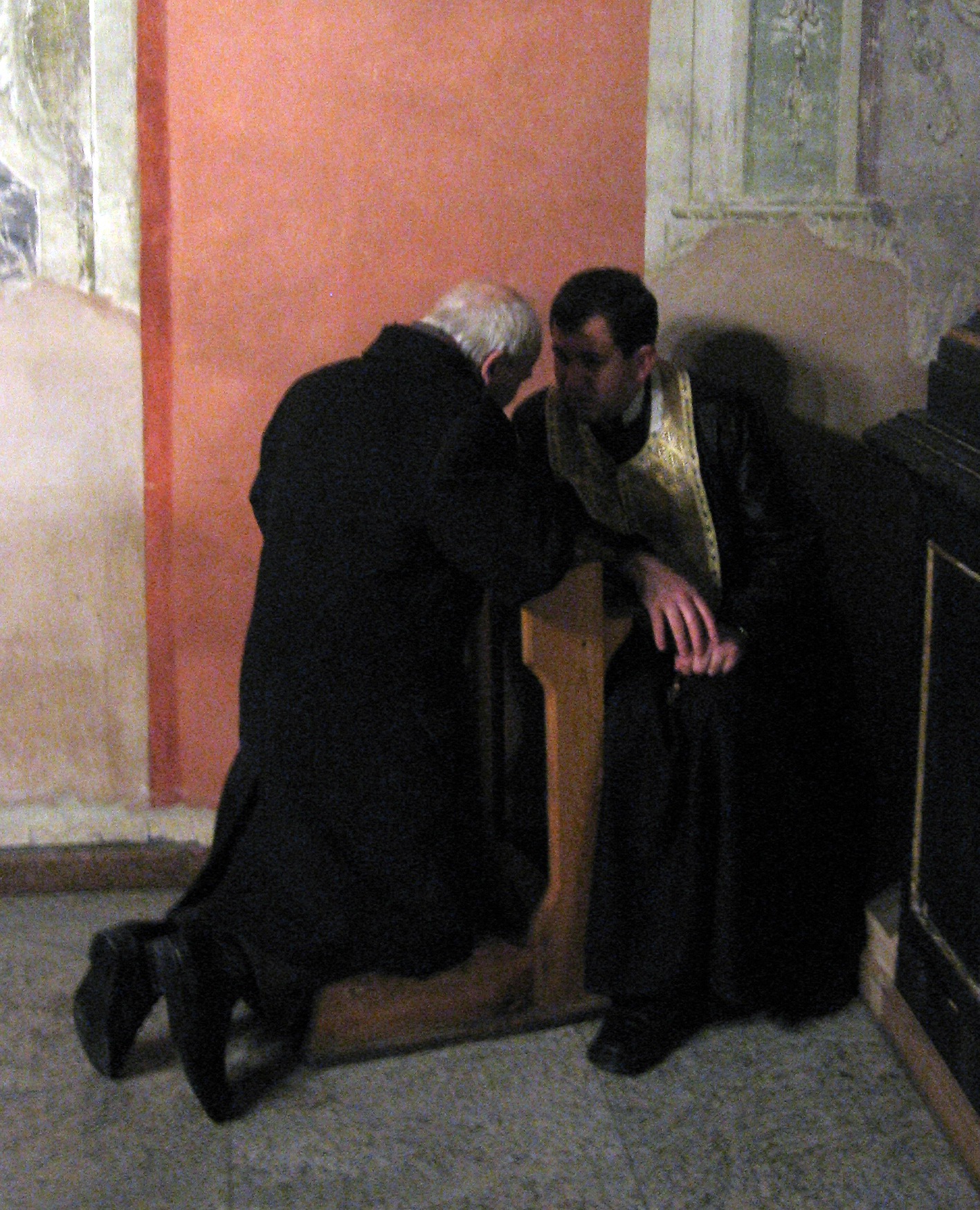
Ukrainian Byzantine Rite Greek-Catholic church of the Bernhardines in Lviv, Ukraine.

Unlike Western Christianity which saw its liturgical practice disrupted during the Migration Period of the Early Middle Ages, Eastern Christianity has retained more the understanding that ecclesiastical reconciliation had in Patristic times. In Eastern Christianity sacraments are called "sacred mysteries". The obligation to confess may be less rigid and this may include only one's most regrettable sins, to experience God's forgiving love. The practice of absolution or of a given penance varies greatly. The emphasis is on conversion of heart rather than on enumeration of sins.

Confession and penance in the rite of the Eastern Orthodox Church, even to our own day, preserve the character of liberation and healing rather than of judgment. Ruling and healing are seen as the same charism, as in early Christian times. Remission of sin is granted on the basis of sincere repentance and confession. Absolution proclaims God's forgiveness of the sin. Penance is entirely therapeutic; it reinforces the penitent's efforts at Christian growth. "Forgiveness of sin procured through sincere and heartfelt repentance is complete and perfect, needing no additional fulfillment," and so "the Orthodox Church most strenuously rejects [...] Latin teaching of penalties and punishments, eternal and temporal remission, the treasury of merits, [...] (and) purgatorial fire."

A perceived ongoing need for reform and development of the sacrament in the Roman rite is argued in a book with a chapter on "From Confession to Reconciliation; Vatican II to 2015". In another book on the sacraments, widely used in universities and seminaries, Joseph Martos explains how he thinks much still needs to be done to bring together what he had learned through biblical and historical studies, "sacramental theory", and the way the sacrament is experienced today, "sacramental practice". There has been widespread demand for more general use of the Third Rite, a reconciliation service with general absolution but requiring individual confession afterwards. However, Canon Law as revised under Pope John Paul II in 1983 has forestalled change for the time being. While arguing for much wider use of community reconciliation services with general absolution and not requiring individual confession, Catholic theologian Ladislas Orsy anticipated, in 1978, further developments in the church's legislation on the Sacrament of Reconciliation and asserted that "we cannot stop; truth and mercy must continue to unfold."

== See also ==
- Christian views on sin
- Handbook for a Confessor
- Note on the importance of the internal forum and the inviolability of the Sacramental Seal
- Paenitentiam agere
- Reconciliatio et paenitentia
- Seven deadly sins
- Spiritual Communion

== Bibliography ==
- Bouyer, Louis (1963). The Spirit and Forms of Protestantism. A. V. Littledale (transl. from French). London-Glasgow: Collins. p. 278.
- Bouyer, Louis (2004). The Word, Church and Sacraments in Protestantism and Catholicism. San Francisco: Ignatius Press. p. 92. ISBN 1-58617-023-6.
- Carey, Patrick W. (2018). Confession : Catholics, repentance, and forgiveness in America. New York, NY. ISBN 978-0190889135.
- Denzinger, Heinrich; Hünermann, Peter; et al., eds. (2012). "Denzinger". Enchiridion symbolorum: a compendium of creeds, definitions and declarations of the Catholic Church (43rd ed.). San Francisco: Ignatius Press. ISBN 978-0-89870-746-5.
- Martos, Joseph (2014). Doors to the Sacred. Ligouri.
- Poschmann, Bernhard (1964). Penance and the anointing of the sick. Herder history of dogma. Translated by Courtney, Francis. New York: Herder and Herder. OCLC 2205919.
- Rahner, Karl (1969). "Penance". In Rahner, Karl; Darlapp, Adolf; Ernst, Cornelius; Smyth, Kevin (eds.). Sacramentum mundi: an encyclopedia of theology. Vol. 4. New York [u.a.]: Herder and Herder. pp. 385–399. OCLC 21568.
- Vogel C. (1982). Le pécheur et la pénitence dans l'Église ancienne. Paris: Cerf. p. 213. ISBN 2-204-01949-6.
- Vogel C. (1982). Le pécheur et la pénitence au moyen-age. Paris: Cerf. p. 245. ISBN 2-204-01950-X.
- Code of Canon Law. Prepared under the auspices of the Canon Law Society of America (from 2001 Latin-English print ed.). Vatican City: Libreria Editrice Vaticana. November 4, 2003 – via vatican.va.
- Piacenza, Mauro; Nykiel, Krzysztof Józef (March 20, 2020). "Note from the Apostolic Penitentiary on the Sacrament of Reconciliation in the current pandemic, March 20, 2020" (Press release). Apostolic Penitentiary.
