= Princeps pastorum =

1959 papal encyclical by John XXIII

Princeps pastorum Latin for 'Prince of the Shepherds' Encyclical of Pope John XXIII
- Signature date: 28 November 1959
- Subject: About the missionary apostolate
- Number: 4 of 8 of the pontificate
- Text: In Latin; In English

Princeps pastorum (Latin for 'Prince of the shepherds') is the title of an encyclical letter promulgated by Pope John XXIII on 28 November 1959. Its title is derived from a passage in the First Epistle of Peter concerning the "chief shepherd" or "prince of pastors", referring to Jesus Christ. In its English translation the letter opens with the phrase On the day when "the Prince of the shepherds" entrusted to Us His lambs and sheep.

== Contents ==
The letter celebrates the success of Catholic missions to promote the faith, encourages the fostering of native clergy in the countries to which the missions extended and emphasises the importance of lay Catholics as representatives of the church in non-Catholic countries. The encyclical points out that while social welfare initiatives are to be supported, the primary task of missions should be to spread Catholic doctrine.

An observation regarding the need to adapt missionary methods to "local conditions and needs", which may vary around the world, is acknowledged in the Second Vatican Council's Decree on the Apostolate of the Laity published in 1965.

== See also ==
- List of encyclicals of Pope John XXIII
