= Ad Petri Cathedram =

1959 papal encyclical of pastoral character

Ad Petri Cathedram Latin for 'To the Chair of Peter' Encyclical of Pope John XXIII
- Signature date: 29 June 1959
- Subject: Truth, unity and peace in the spirit of charity
- Number: 1 of 8 of the pontificate
- Text: In Latin; In English

Ad Petri Cathedram (Ecclesiastical Latin: [ad ˈpetri ˈkatedram]; "To the Chair of Peter") was the first encyclical issued by Pope John XXIII on 29 June 1959. It was promulgated eight months into the pontificate and addresses truth, unity and peace in the spirit of charity. The document makes several references to the planned Second Vatican Ecumenical Council later held during 1962–1965.

It was neither a trend-setting social document or doctrinal exposition, but instead a fatherly message which was seen as addressing its issues with warmth and pastoral concern.

The encyclical named indifference towards the truth as the cause of many of the world's social evils, and called for modern communications and the press to remember their responsibility to report only the truth. The encyclical advocated for greater unity between churches, nations, classes of people and within families. It asserted that the Catholic Church is distinguished by three unities: unity of doctrine, unity of organization, unity of worship. The last part of the encyclical was a call to action in a number of crucial areas, including social justice and the combating of false ideas.

== See also ==
- List of encyclicals of Pope John XXIII
