= Garry Wills =

American author, political philosopher and historian (born 1934)

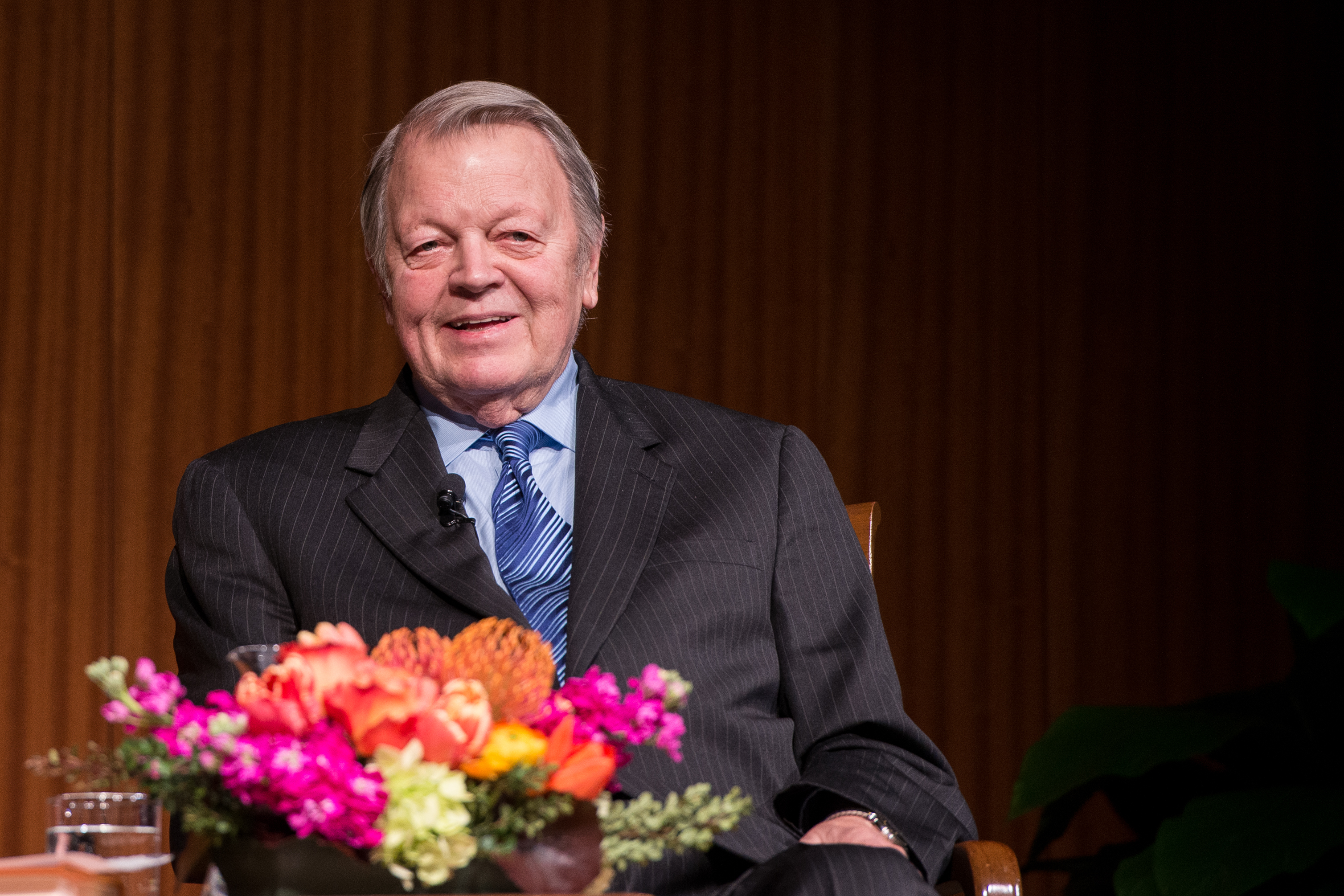
- Wills at the Lyndon Baines Johnson Presidential Library, 2015
- Born: May 22, 1934 (age 92); Atlanta, Georgia, U.S.
- Education: Saint Louis University (BA); Xavier University (MA); Yale University (PhD)
- Occupations: Author; journalist; historian
- Spouse: Natalie Cavallo (m. 1959; died 2019)
- Writing career
- Period: 1961–present
- Subjects: American politics and political history, the Catholic Church
- Notable awards: Pulitzer Prize for General Nonfiction (1993); National Medal for the Humanities (1998)

Garry Wills (born May 22, 1934) is an American historian, author, and political philosopher. He has written on American history, politics, and religion, particularly the history of the Catholic Church. He won a Pulitzer Prize for General Nonfiction in 1993 for his book, Lincoln at Gettysburg.

Wills has written over fifty books and, since 1973, has been a frequent reviewer for The New York Review of Books. Wills received his doctorate from Yale University and was a professor of history at Johns Hopkins University. He became a faculty member of the history department at Northwestern University in 1980, where he is an Emeritus Professor of History.

== Early years ==
Wills was born on May 22, 1934, in Atlanta, Georgia. His father, Jack Wills, was from a Protestant background, and his mother was from an Irish Catholic family. He was reared as Catholic and grew up in Michigan and Wisconsin, graduating in 1951 from Campion High School, a Jesuit institution in Prairie du Chien, Wisconsin. He entered and then left the Society of Jesus.

Wills earned a Bachelor of Arts degree from Saint Louis University in 1957 and a Master of Arts degree from Xavier University in 1958, both in philosophy. William F. Buckley Jr. hired him as a drama critic for National Review magazine at the age of 23. He received a Doctor of Philosophy degree in classics from Yale University in 1961. He taught history at Johns Hopkins University from 1962 to 1980, and is a fellow at the University of Edinburgh.

== Personal life ==
Wills was married for sixty years (1959–2019) to Natalie Cavallo, a collaborator and photographer for his work. They have three children: John, Garry, and Lydia.

A trained classicist, Wills is proficient in Ancient Greek and Latin. His home in Evanston, Illinois, was "filled with books", with a converted bedroom dedicated to English literature, another containing Latin literature and books on American political thought, one hallway full of books on economics and religion, "including four shelves on St. Augustine", and another with shelves of Greek literature and philosophy. After his wife's death in 2019 and the sale of their house, he donated most of his library to Loyola University Chicago, but retained what he termed "the core".

== Religion ==
Wills is a Catholic and, with the exception of a period of doubt during his seminary years, has been one all his life. He prayed the rosary every day, and wrote a book about it (The Rosary: Prayer Comes Around) in 2005.

In a May 2024 interview with the Chicago Tribune, Wills revealed that he no longer considers himself a Catholic nor takes communion. Instead he refers to himself as an "Augustinian Christian." Wills attributes this change to the influence of his late wife, Natalie, who died in 2019 after 60 years of marriage and deeply influenced his thinking on everything from the day that he met her on an airplane two years before they married.

Wills has also been a critic of many aspects of Church history and Church teaching since at least the early 1960s. He has been particularly critical of the doctrine of papal infallibility; the social teachings of the church regarding homosexuality, abortion, contraception, and the Eucharist; and of the church's reaction to the sex abuse scandal.

In 1961, in a phone conversation with William F. Buckley Jr., Wills coined the famous macaronic phrase Mater si, magistra no (literally "mother yes, teacher no"). The phrase, which was a response to the papal encyclical Mater et magistra and a reference to the then-current anti-Castro slogan "Cuba sí, Castro no", signifies a devotion to the faith and tradition of the church, combined with a skeptical attitude towards ecclesiastical–Church authority.

Wills published a full-length analysis of the contemporary Catholic Church, Bare Ruined Choirs, in 1972 and a full-scale criticism of the historical and contemporary church, Papal Sin: Structures of Deceit, in 2000. He followed up the latter with a sequel, Why I Am a Catholic (2002), as well as with the books What Jesus Meant (2006), What Paul Meant (2006), and What the Gospels Meant (2008).

== Politics ==
Wills began his career as an early protégé of William F. Buckley Jr. and was associated with conservatism. When he first became involved with National Review he did not know if he was a conservative, calling himself a distributist. Later on, he was self-admittedly conservative, being regarded for a time as the "token conservative" for the National Catholic Reporter. In 1979, after having supported more liberal positions for 20 years, he wrote a book titled Confessions of a Conservative, in which he described his break from William F. Buckley and the American conservative movement, while continuing to remain in some ways ethically and culturally conservative.

However, during the 1960s and 1970s, driven by his coverage of both civil rights and the anti-Vietnam War movements, Wills became increasingly liberal. His biography of president Richard M. Nixon, Nixon Agonistes (1970) landed him on the master list of Nixon political opponents. He supported Barack Obama in the 2008 presidential election, but declared two years later that Obama's presidency had been a "terrible disappointment".

In 1995, Wills wrote an article about the Second Amendment for The New York Review of Books. It was originally titled "Why We Have No Right to Bear Arms", but that was not Wills's conclusion. He neither wrote the title nor approved it prior to the article's publication. Instead, Wills argued that the Second Amendment refers to the right to keep and bear arms in a military context only, rather than justifying private ownership and use of guns. Furthermore, he said the military context did not entail the right of individuals to overthrow the government of the United States:

The Standard Model finds, squirrelled away in the Second Amendment, not only a private right to own guns for any purpose but a public right to oppose with arms the government of the United States. It grounds this claim in the right of insurrection, which clearly does exist whenever tyranny exists. Yet the right to overthrow the government is not given by government. It arises when government no longer has any authority. One cannot say one rebels by right of that nonexistent authority. Modern militias say the government itself instructs them to overthrow government—and wacky scholars endorse this view. They think the Constitution is so deranged a document that it brands as the greatest crime a war upon itself (in Article III: 'Treason against the United States shall consist only in levying war against them . . .') and then instructs its citizens to take this up (in the Second Amendment). According to this doctrine, a well-regulated group is meant to overthrow its own regulator, and a soldier swearing to obey orders is disqualified from true militia virtue.

— Garry Wills, 1995

== Public appraisal ==
The New York Times literary critic John Leonard said in 1970 that Wills's book Nixon Agonistes "reads like a combination of H. L. Mencken, John Locke and Albert Camus." The Catholic journalist John L. Allen Jr. considered Wills to be "perhaps the most distinguished Catholic intellectual in America over the last 50 years" (as of 2008). Martin Gardner in "The Strange Case of Garry Wills" states there is a "mystery and strangeness that hovers like a gray fog over everything Wills has written about his faith."

== Honors ==
- 1978: Inventing America—National Book Critics Circle Award for General Nonfiction (co-winner, with Facts of Life by Maureen Howard)
- 1979: Inventing America—Merle Curti Award
- 1982: Honorary degree of L.H.D. by the College of the Holy Cross
- 1992: Lincoln at Gettysburg—National Book Critics Circle Award for Criticism
- 1993: Lincoln at Gettysburg—Pulitzer Prize for General Nonfiction
- 1995: Honorary degree from Bates College
- 1998: National Medal for the Humanities
- 2001: The Lincoln Forum's Richard Nelson Current Award of Achievement
- 2003: Inducted to the American Philosophical Society
- 2004: St. Louis Literary Award from the Saint Louis University Library Associates
- Inducted as a Laureate of The Lincoln Academy of Illinois and awarded the Order of Lincoln (the State's highest honor) by the Governor of Illinois in 2006 in the area of Communication and Education.

== Works ==
- Chesterton: Man and Mask, Doubleday, 1961. ISBN 978-0-385-50290-0
- Animals of the Bible (1962)
- Politics and Catholic Freedom (1964)
- Roman Culture: Weapons and the Man (1966), ISBN 0-8076-0367-8
- The Second Civil War: Arming for Armageddon (1968)
- Jack Ruby (1968), ISBN 0-306-80564-2
- Nixon Agonistes: The Crisis of the Self-made Man (1970, 1979), ISBN 0-451-61750-9
- Bare Ruined Choirs: Doubt, Prophecy, and Radical Religion (1972), ISBN 0-385-08970-8
- Values Americans Live By (1973), ISBN 0-405-04166-7
- Inventing America: Jefferson's Declaration of Independence (1978), ISBN 0-385-08976-7
- Confessions of a Conservative (1979), ISBN 0-385-08977-5
- At Button's (1979), ISBN 0-8362-6108-9
- Explaining America: The Federalist (1981), ISBN 0-385-14689-2
- The Kennedy Imprisonment: A Meditation on Power (1982), ISBN 0-316-94385-1
- Lead Time: A Journalist's Education (1983), ISBN 0-385-17695-3
- Cincinnatus: George Washington and the Enlightenment (1984), ISBN 0-385-17562-0
- Reagan's America: Innocents at Home (1987), ISBN 0-385-18286-4
- Under God: Religion and American Politics (1990), ISBN 0-671-65705-4
- Lincoln at Gettysburg: The Words That Remade America (1992), ISBN 0-671-76956-1
- Certain Trumpets: The Call of Leaders (1994), ISBN 0-671-65702-X
- Witches and Jesuits: Shakespeare's Macbeth (1995), ISBN 0-19-508879-4
- John Wayne's America: The Politics of Celebrity (1997), ISBN 0-684-80823-4
- Saint Augustine (1999), ISBN 0-670-88610-6
- Saint Augustine's Childhood (2001), ISBN 0-670-03001-5
- Saint Augustine's Memory (2002), ISBN 0-670-03127-5
- Saint Augustine's Sin (2003), ISBN 0-670-03241-7
- Saint Augustine's Conversion (2004), ISBN 0-670-03352-9
- A Necessary Evil: A History of American Distrust of Government (1999), ISBN 0-684-84489-3
- Papal Sin: Structures of Deceit (2000), ISBN 0-385-49410-6
- Venice: Lion City: The Religion of Empire (2001), ISBN 0-684-87190-4
- Why I Am a Catholic (2002), ISBN 0-618-13429-8
- Mr. Jefferson's University (2002), ISBN 0-7922-6531-9
- James Madison (2002), ISBN 0-8050-6905-4
- Negro President: Jefferson and the Slave Power (2003), ISBN 0-618-34398-9
- Henry Adams and the Making of America (2005), ISBN 0-618-13430-1
- The Rosary: Prayer Comes Round (2005), ISBN 0-670-03449-5
- What Jesus Meant (2006), ISBN 0-670-03496-7
- What Paul Meant (2006), ISBN 0-670-03793-1
- Bush's Fringe Government (2006), ISBN 978-1590172100
- Head and Heart: American Christianities (2007), ISBN 978-1-59420-146-2
- What the Gospels Meant (2008), ISBN 0-670-01871-6
- Bomb Power (2010), ISBN 978-1-59420-240-7
- Outside Looking In: Adventures of an Observer (2010), ISBN 978-0-670-02214-4
- Augustine's 'Confessions': A Biography (2011), ISBN 978-0691143576
- Verdi's Shakespeare: Men of the Theater (2011), ISBN 978-0670023042
- Rome and Rhetoric: Shakespeare's Julius Caesar (2011), ISBN 978-0300152180
- Font of Life: Ambrose, Augustine, and the Mystery of Baptism (2012), ISBN 978-0199768516
- Why Priests? (2013), ISBN 978-0670024872
- Making Make-Believe Real: Politics as Theater in Shakespeare's Time (2014) ISBN 978-0-300-19753-2
- The Future of the Catholic Church with Pope Francis (March 2015), ISBN 978-0525426967
- What The Qur'an Meant and Why It Matters (2017), ISBN 978-1-101-98102-3
