= Lincoln at Gettysburg =

1992 book by Garry Wills

Lincoln at Gettysburg: The Words That Remade America
- Cover of Lincoln at Gettysburg: The Words That Remade America; featured is Abraham Lincoln
- Author: Garry Wills
- Subject: Abraham Lincoln; Gettysburg Address
- Genre: Nonfiction
- Published: 1992 Simon & Schuster
- Publication place: United States

Lincoln at Gettysburg: The Words That Remade America was written by Garry Wills, who was an adjunct professor of history at Northwestern University at the time that his book was published. The book, which became a best-seller during the 1990s, argued that Lincoln's 272-word address, which was delivered during the dedication of the new national cemetery at Gettysburg on November 19, 1863, was so powerful that it reshaped the United States by altering Americans' view of both the Declaration of Independence and the U.S. Constitution.

Released by Simon & Schuster in 1992, Wills' book won the 1993 Pulitzer Prize for General Nonfiction and the 1992 National Book Critics Circle Award for Criticism.

== Background ==
Wills' book used U.S. President Abraham Lincoln's notably short speech at Gettysburg as the basis for his examination of Lincoln's overall style of rhetoric, while also making the case that it had not been a hastily conceived speech "written on the back of an envelope", as has often been presented in historical accounts of the speech's writing, but that it was painstakingly crafted over a period of weeks.

Wills compared Lincoln's speech to one delivered on the same day by Edward Everett, focusing on the influences of the Greek revival in the United States and 19th century transcendentalist thought. Wills also argued that Lincoln's speech drew on his interpretation of the U.S. Constitution, adding that Lincoln considered the Declaration of Independence the first founding document, and looked to its emphasis on equality (changing Locke's phrase "Life, Liberty, and Property" to "Life, Liberty, and the Pursuit of Happiness") in issuing the Emancipation Proclamation. According to Wills:

Lincoln's speech at Gettysburg worked several revolutions, beginning with one in literary style....The spare quality of Lincoln's prose did not come naturally but was worked at. Lincoln not only read aloud, to think his way into sounds, but also wrote as a way of ordering his thought.... It was the logical side of language—the principles of order as these reflect patterns of thought or the external world—that appealed to him.

He was also ... laboriously precise in his choice of words.... The unwillingness to waste words shows up in the address's telegraphic quality—the omission of coupling words, a technique rhetoricians call asyndeton. Triple phrases sound as to a drumbeat, with no 'and' or but' to slow their insistency....

The language itself is made strenuous, its musculature easily traced, so that even the grammar becomes a form of rhetoric. By repeating the antecedent as often as possible, instead of referring to it indirectly by pronouns like 'it' and 'they,' or by backward referential words like 'former' and 'latter,' Lincoln interlocks his sentences, making of them a constantly self-referential system. This linking up by explicit repetition amounts to a kind of hook-and-eye method for joining the parts of his address. The rhetorical devices are almost invisible, since they use no figurative language.
