= Paenitentiam agere =

1962 papal encyclical by John XXIII

Paenitentiam agere Latin for 'Penance for sins' Encyclical of Pope John XXIII
- Signature date: 1 July 1962
- Subject: The need for the practice of interior and exterior penance
- Number: 7 of 8 of the pontificate
- Text: In Latin; In English

Paenitentiam agere ("Penance for sins") was the seventh encyclical made by Pope John XXIII, and was issued on 1 July 1962.

== Contents ==
The encyclical calls on Christians to practice penance, including mortification of the flesh.

It also considers the upcoming Second Vatican Council as a reason for such preparation by the faithful.

== See also ==
- List of encyclicals of Pope John XXIII
