= Sacerdotii nostri primordia =

1959 papal encyclical by John XXIII

Sacerdotii nostri primordia Latin for 'From the beginning of our priesthood' Encyclical of Pope John XXIII
- Signature date: 1 August 1959
- Subject: About St. John Vianney
- Number: 2 of 8 of the pontificate
- Text: In Latin; In English

Sacerdotii nostri primordia ("From the beginning of our priesthood") was the second encyclical of Pope John XXIII, issued 1 August 1959. It commemorated the 100th anniversary of the death of St. John Vianney, the patron saint of priests.

== See also ==
- List of encyclicals of Pope John XXIII
- Saint John Vianney's prayer to Jesus
