= St. John Vianney's Church, Peshawar =

Pakistani church building

St. John Vianney Church
- Location: City Circular Road, Peshawar,
- Country: Pakistan
- Denomination: Roman Catholic
- Tradition: Latin

History
- Events: In 2001 unknown gunmen sprayed a Sunday church service with automatic weapons fire killing 16 worshippers

Architecture
- Functional status: Active

Administration
- Metropolis: Lahore
- Diocese: Diocese of Islamabad-Rawalpindi

Clergy
- Bishop: Joseph Arshad
- Priest: Fr. Fabian Paul

St. John Vianney's Church is a Catholic church on City Circular Road, Peshawar, Pakistan. It is part of the Roman Catholic Diocese of Islamabad-Rawalpindi. It should not be confused with the Anglican St. John's Church, Peshawar in Peshawar Cantonment.

On 17 December 1990, a group of Christian youth assembled to protest the desecration and attack on St. John Vianney's Church in Peshawar. Prime Minister Mian Nawaz Sharif has directed all federal and provincial authorities to protect minorities and their places of worship. Armed police have been posted at the church since 15 December 1990.

Church leaders protested the government's failure to arrest Muslim extremists responsible for desecrating St. John Vianney's Church in Peshawar, and the Catholic church in Bahawalpur. The Peshawar church was stoned and windows were broken in November 1990, and the church in Bahawalpur was burned down in 1985. The protesters also demanded that the Qisas (retaliation) and Diyat (blood money) Ordinance not be implemented for non-Muslims; that Christians being tried under Islamic law be tried under civil law; that the bill allowing intercaste marriages be cancelled; and a minority commission headed by a Supreme Court judge be formed to formulate a Christian personal law. The strike was planned to continue until the demands were met.

In October 2001, St. John Vianney's Church locked its gates for the first time and five city policemen, armed with AK-47 assault rifles, moved into the church compound. On 29 October, unknown gunmen sprayed a Sunday church service with automatic weapons fire, killing 16. The parish priest, Fr. Yaqub Shahzad said that life would never be the same for the 15,000 Christians in Peshawar, a city of 4 million. The church was feeding more than 100 neighborhood people, including children from destitute families, with monthly supplies of staples such as flour, sugar and cooking oil.

The parish priest in 2016 was Fr. John William. The parish at the time served around 10,000 people.

The parish priest in 2017 was Fr. Anthan Ilyas. Benjimen Yaqub and his family worked in supporting and solving various issues that raised time by time in the sub station churches of the parish

The city parish includes two Federally Administered Tribal Areas: Landi Kotal or Landikotal (Urdu: لنڈی کوتل) is a town of the Federally Administered Tribal Areas. It is located at 34°6'4N 71°8'44E and lies in the Khyber Pass. At 1,072 metres above sea level it is the highest point in the Khyber Pass. There are about 75 Christian families, with about 50 families Catholic. Another area is Jamrud (Pashto: جمرود, Urdu: جمرود), a town located in the Khyber Agency. There are about 11 Catholic families. Another agency is Mohmand Agency, (Pashto: مومند ) a district created in 1951. The agency headquarters is at Ghalanai, where about 32 Catholic families reside. Fr. Shamaun and Seminarian Daniel visit the areas twice a month.

In 2021, Jamshed Thomas, a Christian member of the National Assembly from Khyber Pakhtunkhwa province, made available 24 laptop computers among Christian, Hindu and Sikh students. 5 of these laptops were raffled off in St. John Vianney's parish in May 2021. Father Khalid Mukhtar was the parish priest at the time.
