= Mater et magistra =

1961 encyclical by Pope John XXIII

Mater et magistra Latin for 'Mother and Teacher' Encyclical of Pope John XXIII
- Signature date: 15 May 1961
- Subject: On the increasing development of social issues in the light of the Christian doctrine
- Number: 5 of 8 of the pontificate
- Text: In Latin; In English

Mater et magistra is an encyclical written by Pope John XXIII on the topic of "Christianity and Social Progress". It was promulgated on 15 May 1961. The title means "mother and teacher", referring to the role of the church. It describes the necessity of working towards authentic community in order to promote human dignity. It taught that the state must sometimes intervene in matters of health care, education, and housing.

== Context ==
Mater et magistra was written in observance of the 70th anniversary of Pope Leo XIII's social encyclical Rerum novarum. It also refers to the social teaching of Pope Pius XI in Quadragesimo anno, and to Pope Pius XII's radio broadcast given to commemorate the 50th anniversary of Rerum novarum on 1 June 1941.

The document mentions the following changes seen in the world since 1891:

- scientific advances including atomic energy, synthetic materials, increased automation, modern agriculture, new means of communication (radio and television), faster transportation, the beginnings of space travel
- new social systems such as social security, improved basic education, breaking down of class barriers, and greater awareness of public affairs by the average person
- lack of economic balance between agriculture and industry, and among different countries
- in the political sphere, the breakdown of colonialism, independence for many states in Asia and Africa, and an increasing network of international organizations.

The document deals authoritatively and succinctly with the perennial - "render unto Caesar the things that are Caesar's and to God the things that are God's" - stewardship dichotomy at paragraphs 254 to 257, with continuing social teaching calls, upon all of "the laity especially", to intensify and increase continually their personal Christian commitment in this passing world - brief extracts (supported in the document using selected scriptural quotes) state that:

- 254 - "On the contrary, We insist that they must intensify it and increase it continually."
- 255 - "Let no man therefore imagine that a life of activity in the world is incompatible with spiritual perfection. The two can very well be harmonized."
- 256 - Sub-Titled "Perfection through daily work." "That a man should develop and perfect himself through his daily work - which in most cases is of a temporal character - is perfectly in keeping with the plan of divine Providence."
- 257 - Sub-Titled "Greater Efficiency in Temporal Affairs."

"To search for spiritual perfection and eternal salvation in the conduct of human affairs and institutions is not to rob these of the power to achieve their immediate, specific ends, but to enhance this power." "The man who is 'Light in the Lord' and who walks as a 'child of the light' has a sure grasp of the fundamental demands of justice in all life's difficulties and complexities, obscured though they may be by so much individual, national and racial selfishness." "Animated too, by the charity of Christ, he finds it impossible not to love his fellow men." "For 'charity is patient, is kind; charity envieth not, dealeth not perversely, is not puffed up, is not ambitious, seeketh not her own, is not provoked to anger, thinketh no evil, rejoiceth not in iniquity, but rejoiceth with the truth; beareth all things, believeth all things, hopeth all things, endureth all things'."

Pope John XXIII issued the papal bull convoking the 21st ecumenical council Humanae salutis on Christmas Day 1961. A 12 page curated translation into English is available online at the University of Notre Dame.

== Review of previous teaching ==
Mater et magistra begins by praising three earlier papal documents on social topics and summarizing their key points.

Rerum novarum is extolled: "Here for the first time was a complete synthesis of social principles, formulated with such historical insight as to be of permanent value to Christendom ... rightly regarded as a compendium of Catholic social and economic teaching", "the Magna Charta of social and economic reconstruction" whose influence was not only apparent in later Church documents, but "discernible too in the subsequent legislation of a number of States". Pope John summarized the main points of Rerum novarum as work, private property, the role of the state, right of association, and human solidarity. He summarized the main message of Quadragesimo anno, as two key points:

- Charity, not self-interest, should be "the supreme criterion in economic matters".
- It is the responsibility of humankind to create a national and international order that promotes social justice, "in which all economic activity can be conducted not merely for private gain but also in the interests of the common good".

== Clarifications and new aspects ==
=== Common good seen as balance ===
Mater et magistra frequently explains the common good as a desirable balance between different elements of the society or the economy. For example, a business must balance its unity of direction with the needs of its individual workers. Development and progress in the industrial, service, and agricultural sectors must balance. Individual freedom and initiative must balance with necessary action of the civil authority, including the appropriate public ownership of property, based on the principle of subsidiarity. Economic progress should balance with social progress, especially a reduction in inequality.

=== Special concern for agriculture ===
The Pope writes of the dignity of agricultural work, with the family farm held up as an ideal. A trend of people moving away from farms toward cities was partly due to economic growth, but also reflected depression in the occupation of farming and inadequate standards of living in rural areas. The Pope urged that measures be taken to restore balance between the agricultural sector and industry, as well as development of better facilities and services in rural areas so that "agricultural living standards approximate as closely as possible those enjoyed by city dwellers".

Specific suggestions include:

- developing better roads, communication, drinking water, housing, and schools in rural areas
- ensuring that farms modernize at the same rate as industry
- keeping track of people who move away from farms due to modernization, and insuring that they receive help in adjusting to new types of work
- considering the particular needs of farmers in credit policy and the tax system
- ensuring that farmers get the same social insurance/social security as others
- devising a means of price protection, which could be enforced by the public authority
- establishing industries, especially those having to do with "preservation, processing, and transportation of farm products", in agricultural regions
- self-advancement of the farming community through continuing education and the forming of associations.

The Pope comments on disproportions that exist between the population and the amount of arable land, as well as different levels of agricultural methods, in different parts of the world. These often result in surpluses and scarcities. "[The] solidarity of the human race and Christian brotherhood demand the elimination as far as possible of these discrepancies."

The Food and Agriculture Organization is mentioned for its work in improvement of agriculture and developing international cooperation.

=== International assistance ===
Mater et magistra addresses the needs of countries that were not industrialized. Pope John commends wealthier nations that give assistance to poorer nations. It is required by "justice and humanity" to share surplus food and other goods with other nations in need. Even more powerful are efforts to provide the citizens of those nations with the necessary resources and training to implement modern methods and speed up development. This work should be done with respect for the local cultures and in a disinterested way, without the aim of imposing one’s own culture or gaining political control.

== Subsequent developments ==
The Second Vatican Council, the 21st Catholic Ecumenical council, opened a little more than a year after Mater et magistra was promulgated. The Council's Decree on the Apostolate of the Laity drew on Mater et Magistra on several occasions.

== See also ==
- List of encyclicals of Pope John XXIII
- Mater si, magistra no
