= St. Jean Vianney School =

School in Louisiana, United States

Coordinates: 30°25′26″N 91°0′20″W

St. Jean Vianney Catholic School

Location
- 16266 S. Harrell's Ferry Road; Baton Rouge, Louisiana, 70816; United States

Information
- Type: Private, Roman Catholic
- Opened: August 1985
- Principal: Mrs. Wendy Gilmore Ross
- Grades: K–8
- Enrollment: 485
- Colors: Red and White
- Mascot: Gators
- Website: Official website

St. Jean Vianney Catholic School is a Roman Catholic Elementary/Middle Parochial School in Baton Rouge, Louisiana. It runs from kindergarten to eighth grade and is a part of the Roman Catholic Diocese of Baton Rouge. The school opened in 1985.

== History ==
The school opened in August 1985 as a parish elementary school with a small enrollment of 100 students in kindergarten through grade 4. The school building, consisting of two floors with four classrooms on each, was dedicated by Bishop Stanley Ott and Father Eugene Engels, the pastor at St. Jean Vianney Church at the time.

Between 1985 and 1992, the enrollment grew to approximately 300. Because of this, starting with the Class of 2000, who entered kindergarten in the 1991–1992 school year, the classes for each grade were split in two with about thirty students in each section. In addition, a second wing containing four classrooms and a larger cafeteria was constructed and opened in the 1992–1993 school year. Also during this year, a courtyard containing concrete paths, trees, and a flagpole was built between the two buildings.

In 1991, the school opened a computer lab with about thirty computers donated by Piccadilly Cafeterias. In 1995, the school's library was moved from a small classroom to a hall on the church grounds known as "Curé d'Ars Hall," which also served as the original school cafeteria until 1992. Between 1995 and 2000, the campus received four temporary buildings for use as alternate classrooms and for electives. In 1998, to accommodate for an even larger student body, the cafeteria was converted into four classrooms. Since 1998, students eat their lunch in the old church building, now known as Father Engels Hall.

== Students ==
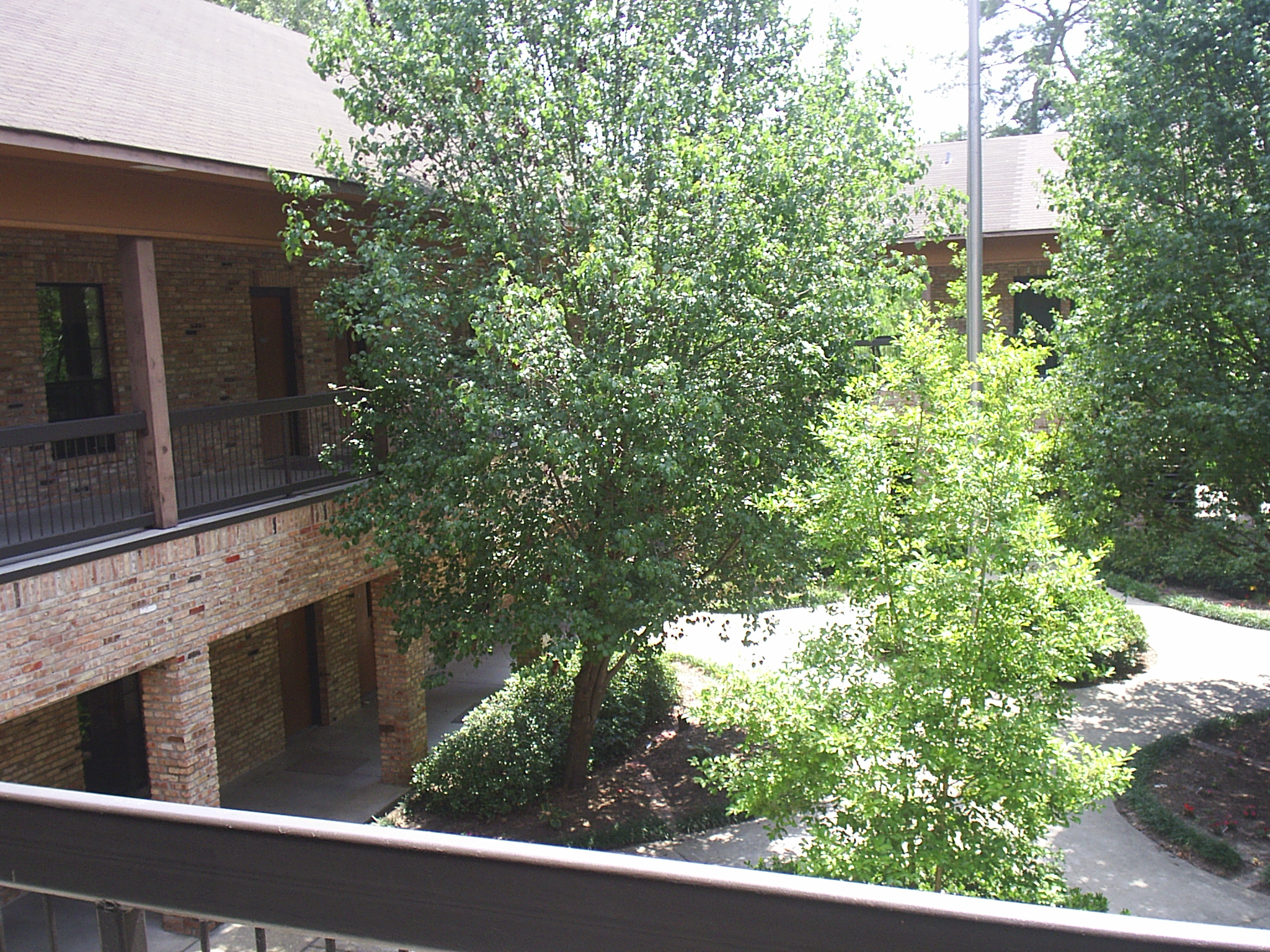
The school's courtyard and first building, taken from the second floor

As of 2006, there were approximately 500 students, and since 1999, the enrollment has been around that number. Immediately following Hurricane Katrina, the school accepted several dozens of students from New Orleans, bringing its enrollment close to 600, but many returned to their schools soon after. Students are required to wear uniforms, and in addition, they have to wear dress clothing (long pants for boys and skirts for girls) on days in which the Mass is celebrated (usually Friday or Holy Days of Obligation); however, there are many opportunities in which students have free dress day. In addition, on the first Friday of each month, students can wear a Spirit Day tee-shirt.

== Academics ==
St. Jean Vianney offers instruction in reading, mathematics, science, social studies, English, and religion to all students. Younger grades also take phonics.

In the middle school grades, there are upper and lower-level classes in various subjects, and some eighth graders can take algebra. There are seven fifty-minute periods daily to accommodate adequate teaching time to each subject, and there is a thirty-minute lunch period, as well as an afternoon recess, for the middle schoolers. The lower grades have two recesses.

Students also participate in electives, which include Spanish, computer science, art, and physical education.

Students from third grade to eighth grade are also required to read between one and three books from an approved list as part of a summer reading program. Also, students, beginning in second grade, participate in the Accelerated Reader program in which they must either read a certain number of books or earn a minimum number of points as part of a required grade in reading class. The three students in each class who earn the most points for each quarter are awarded with a certificate.

At the end of each of the four nine-week quarters, students in grades three through eight who have received all A's in their subjects, conduct, and penmanship receive recognition and awarded certificates for making Principal's List. Students in these grades who have A's and B's on their report card receive Honor Roll recognition. Students who maintain Principal's List or Honor Roll for all four quarters of the year are presented medals for their work at the final awards ceremony. Students who receive all A's in conduct are awarded. The best student in each class, also chosen by the teacher is awarded the SJV Award.

== Athletics and Extracurriculars ==
St. Jean Vianney offers several options for athletic and extracurricular activities. In terms of athletics, boys may play football or basketball, and girls may play basketball or volleyball, or they can serve as cheerleaders. The school also has a co-ed track team, as well as a cross country team. The 2008–2009 school year was the first time the school have ever had a soccer team. It is for grades five through eighth, boys and girls. On January 20, 2016, the school opened the doors to its first gymnasium.

St. Jean Vianney also has a Junior Beta Club, in which middle school students are allowed to join via invitation. The school has a Student Council for middle schoolers. These two clubs participate in service projects around the community. In addition, there is a Math Club, which participates in several local junior high tournaments. A Drama Club was recently started at the school, and they perform a play annually during the spring. The school also has a band and choir, and they perform at both school and sometimes Sunday masses, as well as various other school events. Students can also participate in the yearbook club, in which they assist in producing the school's yearbook.

St. Jean also hosts a Spirit Day Pep Rally several times throughout the year, as well as Field Day at the end of the school year. They traditionally hold Halloween parties for each grade. On a weekly basis, The school celebrates mass, and once a month, students whose birthdays fall during the month are recognized. Fifth and eighth graders participate in the DARE program, and all students participate in an essay, poem, and poster contest hosted by the Catholic Daughters. Middle school students in grade six participate in a Social Studies Fair, grade seven participate in science fair, and grade eight participate in Religion fair..

== Awards ==
In addition to being recognized for Principal's List, Honor Roll, and good conduct, there are various special awards that a student can receive.

Every quarter, the teacher in each class selects an outstanding student to receive the SJV Award. Students can be recognized for perfect attendance at the end of each year. The Woodman of the World Award is presented to an outstanding seventh grader, based on social studies scores in American history. The Claire Goudeau award is also given to up to four fourth-graders who are chosen by their teachers.

Eighth graders have the opportunity to receive additional awards for their effort and contribution to St. Jean Vianney. Subject and athletic awards are presented to outstanding athletes and students at an end-of-the-year breakfast. Two eighth grade students (one boy and one girl) who have participated outstandingly in sports are awarded the Danny Maranto Award. A graduation ceremony and mass is held on a Saturday morning in May to confer diplomas to all eighth graders. Also at this ceremony, the Holy Trinity Award, St. Jean Vianney's highest honor, is presented to the best "all-around" student.

== Principals ==
- Jo Ellen Ourso (1985-1990)
- Lillian Harelson (1990-1995)
- Mike Lucia (1995-1999)
- Lorry Perry (1999-2003)
- Christina Babin (2003-2005)
- Wendy Gilmore Ross (2005–present)

== Mission statement ==
The mission of St. Jean Vianney School is to enhance and develop the God-given capabilities and talents of each student according to Catholic principles and sound educational theory.
