= Outline of Jesus =

Central figure of Christianity

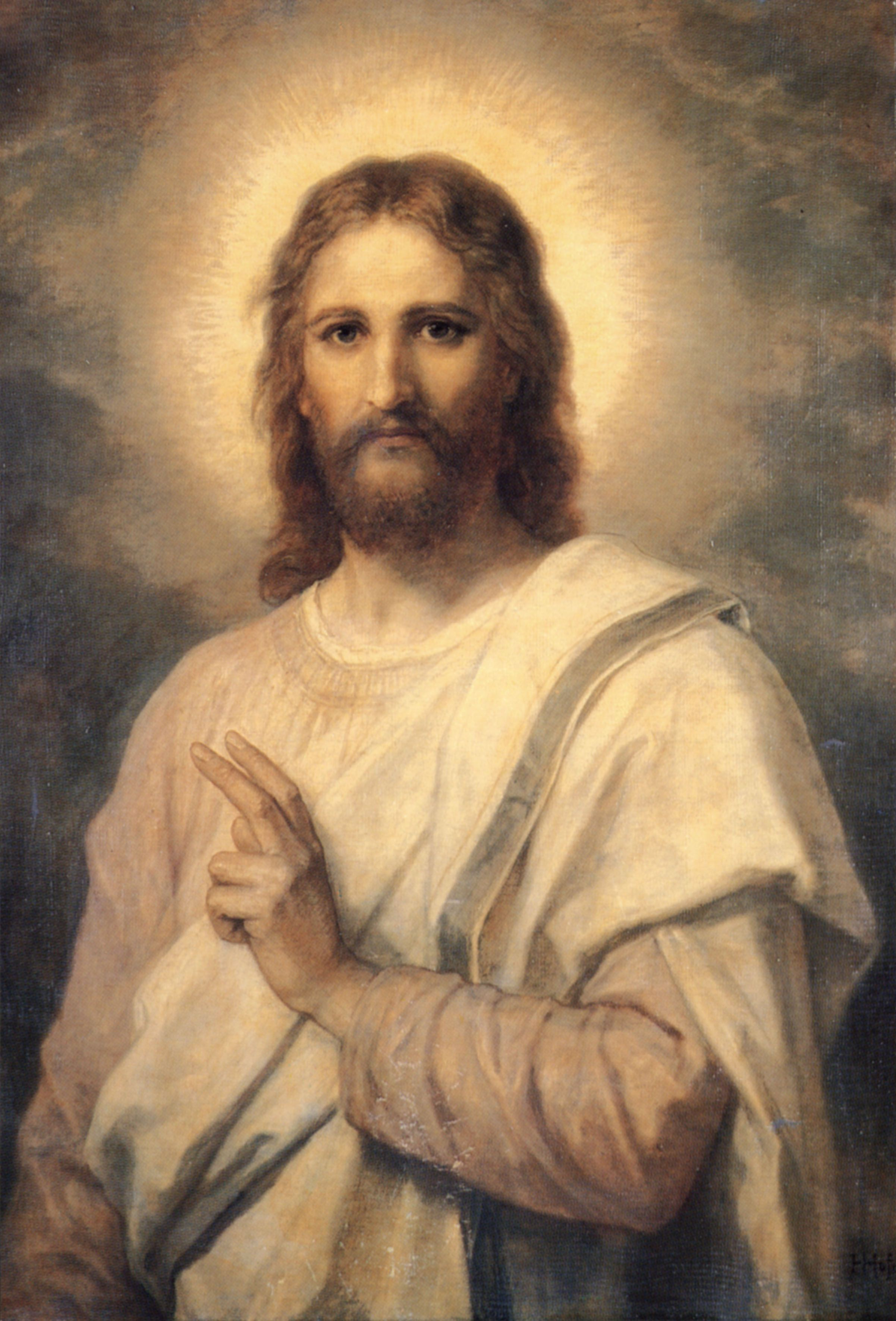
Representation of Jesus Christ in a painting by German painter Heinrich Hofmann from the 1880s

The following outline is provided as an overview of and topical guide to the life and influence of Jesus.

Jesus is the central figure of Christianity, whom the teachings of most Christian denominations hold to be the Son of God and one in being with the Godhead. Christians regard Jesus as the awaited Messiah (or "Christ") of the Old Testament and refer to him as Jesus Christ, (Note: The New Testament records a variety of names and titles accorded to Jesus.) a name that is also used in non-Christian contexts. He is also referred to as Jesus of Nazareth. He is a religious, cultural, worldwide icon, and is among the most influential people in human history.

== Essence of Jesus ==
As a topic, "Jesus" falls under the following parent topics:

- Religion
  - Theism – belief that one or more gods exist
    - Monotheism – belief that only one God exists
      - Abrahamic Religions – religions claiming Abraham as a direct forebear or prophet
        - Christianity – monotheistic religion claiming Jesus as its founder
- Christology
  - Adoptionism
  - Monophysitism
  - Dyophysitism
  - Docetism

== Views of Jesus ==
=== Traditional Christian view of Jesus ===
- Christian views of Jesus
- Jesus in the Christian Bible
  - New Testament view on Jesus' life
    - Gospel
      - Gospel harmony
    - Miracles attributed to Jesus
    - Names and titles of Jesus in the New Testament
    - Sexuality of Jesus
    - Son of God
    - Son of Man
    - Virgin birth of Jesus

==== Four traditional Gospels ====
The word "gospel" is translated from a Greek word meaning "good news."

- Gospel of Matthew –
- Gospel of Mark –
- Gospel of Luke –
- Gospel of John –

==== Trinity ====
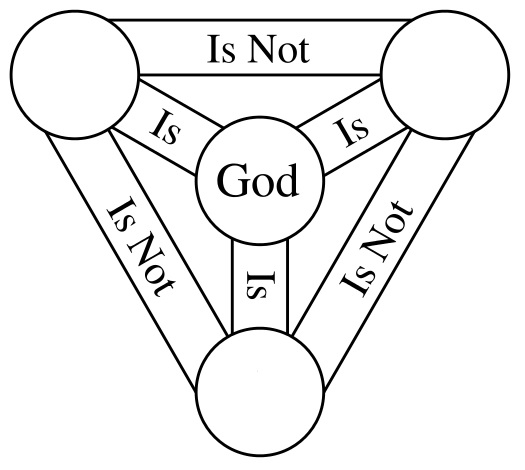
The "Shield of the Trinity" or Scutum Fidei diagram of Trinity Western Christian symbolism

- Trinity
  - God in Christianity
- Nontrinitarianism
  - God in Mormonism
- Islamic view of the Trinity

==== Non-canonical Gospels ====
- Egerton Gospel
- Fayyum Fragment
- Gospel of James
- Gospel of Peter
- Gospel of Thomas
- Infancy Gospel of Thomas
- Oxyrhynchus Gospels
- Syriac Infancy Gospel

==== Additional Gospels ====
- Book of Mormon
- Doctrine and Covenants
- The Desire of Ages
- The Urantia Book
- The Aquarian Gospel of Jesus the Christ

=== Historical view of Jesus ===
- Historical Jesus
- Historicity of Jesus
- Cultural and historical background of Jesus

=== Islamic view of Jesus ===
- Jesus in Islam
- Virgin birth of Jesus
- Jesus in Ahmadiyya Islam

=== Judaic view of Jesus ===
- Judaism's view of Jesus
- Jesus in the Talmud
- apostate

=== Other views of Jesus ===
- Manifestation of God (Baháʼí Faith)
- Mandeanism – do not believe in Jesus as Messiah
- Manicheanism – accepted Jesus as a prophet, along with Gautama Buddha and Zoroaster
- Jesusism – opposed to Pauline Christianity and the mainstream church dogma of Nicene Christianity

==== View of Jesus as mentally disturbed ====
- Mental health of Jesus

==== View of Jesus as myth ====
- Jesus myth theory

== Events in Jesus' life ==
- Chronology of Jesus

=== Events in Jesus' life from the traditional Gospels ===
- Annunciation
- Nativity of Jesus
- Circumcision of Jesus
- Christ child
- Baptism of Jesus
- Temptation of Christ
- Ministry of Jesus
- Commissioning the Twelve Apostles
- Sermon on the Mount
- Rejection of Jesus
- Transfiguration of Jesus
- Giving the great commandment
- Palm Sunday
- Cursing the fig tree
- Cleansing of the Temple
- Second Coming
- Anointing of Jesus
- Last Supper
  - Promising a Paraclete
- Farewell Discourse
- The passion
- The Passion of the Christ
  - Arrest of Jesus
  - Sanhedrin Trial of Jesus
  - Pilate's court
  - Flagellation of Christ
  - Crown of thorns
  - Crucifixion of Jesus
- Entombment of Christ
- Resurrection of Jesus
  - Empty tomb
  - Resurrection appearances of Jesus
  - Great Commission
- Ascension of Jesus

=== Miracles ===
Miracles of Jesus

==== Cures ====
- Healing the mother of Peter's wife
- Healing the deaf mute of Decapolis
- Healing the man blind from birth
- Healing the paralytic at Bethesda
- Blind man of Bethsaida
- Healing the blind near Jericho
- Healing the centurion's servant
- Jesus healing an infirm woman
- Healing the man with a withered hand
- Jesus cleansing a leper
- Cleansing ten lepers
- Healing a man with dropsy
- Jesus healing the bleeding woman
- Healing the paralytic at Capernaum
- Jesus healing in the land of Gennesaret
- Healing the two blind men in Galilee

==== Power over demonic spirits ====
- Exorcising a boy possessed by a demon
- Exorcism of the Syrophoenician woman's daughter
- Exorcism of the Gerasene demoniac
- Jesus in the synagogue of Capernaum
- Jesus exorcising at sunset
- Exorcising the blind and mute man
- Jesus exorcising a mute

==== Resurrection of the dead ====
- Raising of the son of the widow of Nain
- Raising of Jairus' daughter
- Raising of Lazarus

==== Control over nature ====
- Marriage at Cana
- Jesus walking on water
- Calming the storm
- Transfiguration of Jesus
- Feeding the multitude
- Miraculous catch of fish
- Cursing the fig tree
- Coin in the fish's mouth

== Teachings of Jesus ==
- Sermon on the Mount

=== Parables of Jesus ===
- Parables of Jesus

==== Canonical parables ====
- Barren Fig Tree
- Budding Fig Tree
- Counting the cost
- Drawing in the Net
- Faithful Servant
- Friend at Night
- Good Samaritan
- Great Banquet
- Growing Seed
- Hidden Treasure
- Lamp
- Leaven
- Lost Coin
- Lost Sheep
- Master and Servant
- Mustard Seed
- New Wine into Old Wineskins
- Pearl
- Pharisee and the Publican
- Prodigal Son
- Rich Fool
- Rich man and Lazarus
- Sower
- Strong Man
- Talents
- Tares
- Ten Virgins
- Two Debtors
- Two Sons
- Unjust Judge
- Unjust Steward
- Unforgiving Servant
- Wicked Husbandmen
- Wise and Foolish Builders
- Workers in the Vineyard

==== Non-canonical parables ====
- Assassin
- Empty Jar

== Genealogy of Jesus ==
- Genealogy of Jesus

Patrilineage of Jesus according to Luke
1. God (Abrahamic); 2. Adam; 3. Seth; 4. Enos; 5. Cainan; 6. Maleleel; 7. Jared; 8. Enoch; 9. Mathusala; 10. Lamech; 11. Noah; 12. Shem; 13. Arphaxad; 14. Cainan	15. Sala; 16. Heber; 17. Phalec; 18. Ragau; 19. Saruch; 20. Nachor; 21. Thara; 22. Abraham; 23. Isaac; 24. Jacob; 25. Judah; 26. Phares; 27. Esrom; 28. Aram	29. Aminadab; 30. Naasson; 31. Salmon; 32. Boaz; 33. Obed; 34. Jesse; 35. David; 36. Nathan; 37. Mattatha; 38. Menan; 39. Melea; 40. Eliakim; 41. Jonam; 42. Joseph	43. Judah; 44. Simeon; 45. Levi; 46. Matthat; 47. Jorim; 48. Eliezer; 49. Jose; 50. Er; 51. Elmodam; 52. Cosam; 53. Addi; 54. Melchi; 55. Neri; 56. Salathiel	57. Zorobabel; 58. Rhesa; 59. Joannan; 60. Juda; 61. Joseph; 62. Semei; 63. Mattathias; 64. Maath; 65. Nagge; 66. Esli; 67. Naum; 68. Amos; 69. Mattathias; 70. Joseph	71. Jannai; 72. Melchi; 73. Levi; 74. Matthat; 75. Heli; 76. Joseph; 77. Jesus

== Influence of Jesus ==
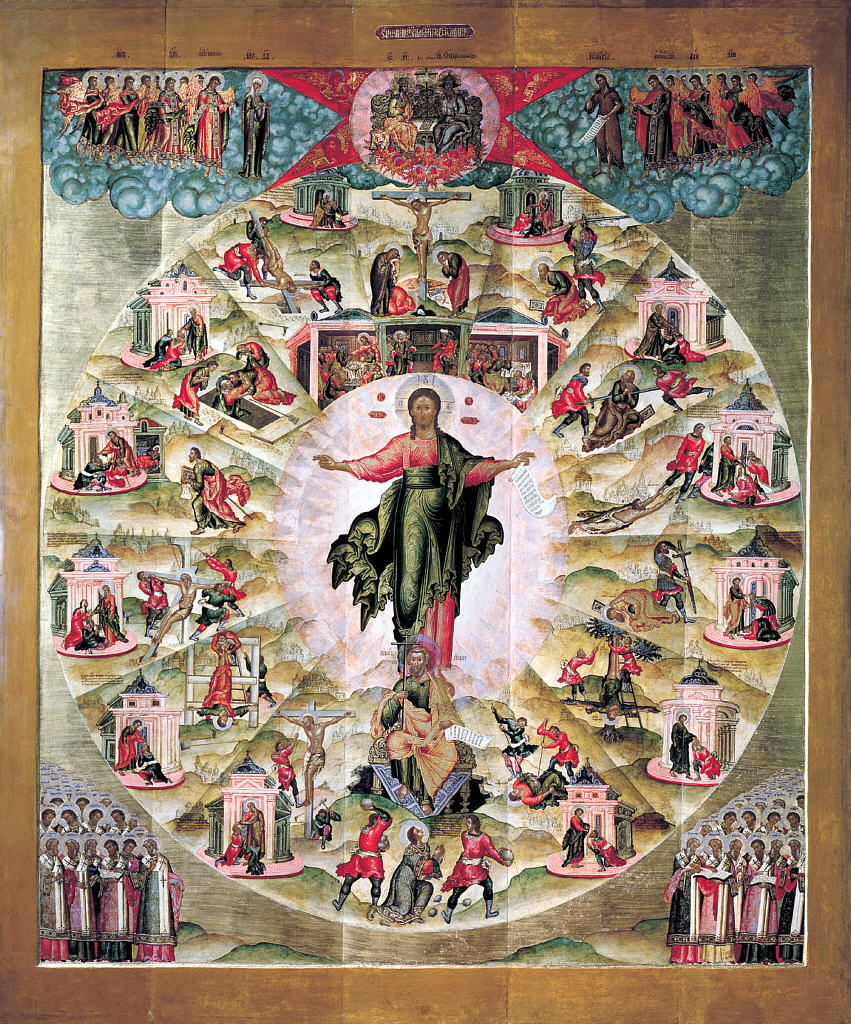
Acts of the Apostles: Russian icon by Fyodor Zubov, 1660

- Ministry of Jesus
- Parables of Jesus

=== Religious practices related to Jesus ===
==== Devotions ====
- Roman Catholic devotions to Jesus Christ
  - Acts of Reparation to Jesus Christ
  - Divine Mercy
  - Eucharistic adoration
  - Holy Face of Jesus
    - The Golden Arrow Holy Face Devotion (Prayer)
  - Holy Hour
  - Holy Name of Jesus
  - Holy Wounds
    - Rosary of Holy Wounds
  - Infant Jesus of Prague
  - Precious Blood
  - Sacred Heart
  - Stations of the Cross

==== Prayers ====
- Jesus Prayer
- Roman Catholic prayers to Jesus
  - Anima Christi
  - Prayer to the shoulder wound of Jesus
  - Morning offering
  - Prayer of Consecration to the Sacred Heart
  - Act of Consecration to the Sacred Heart of Jesus
  - You are Christ
  - Saint John Vianney's prayer to Jesus
  - Prayer of St. John Gabriel Perboyre to Jesus
  - Saint Louis de Montfort's Prayer to Jesus
  - Prayer before a Crucifix

== Second Coming ==
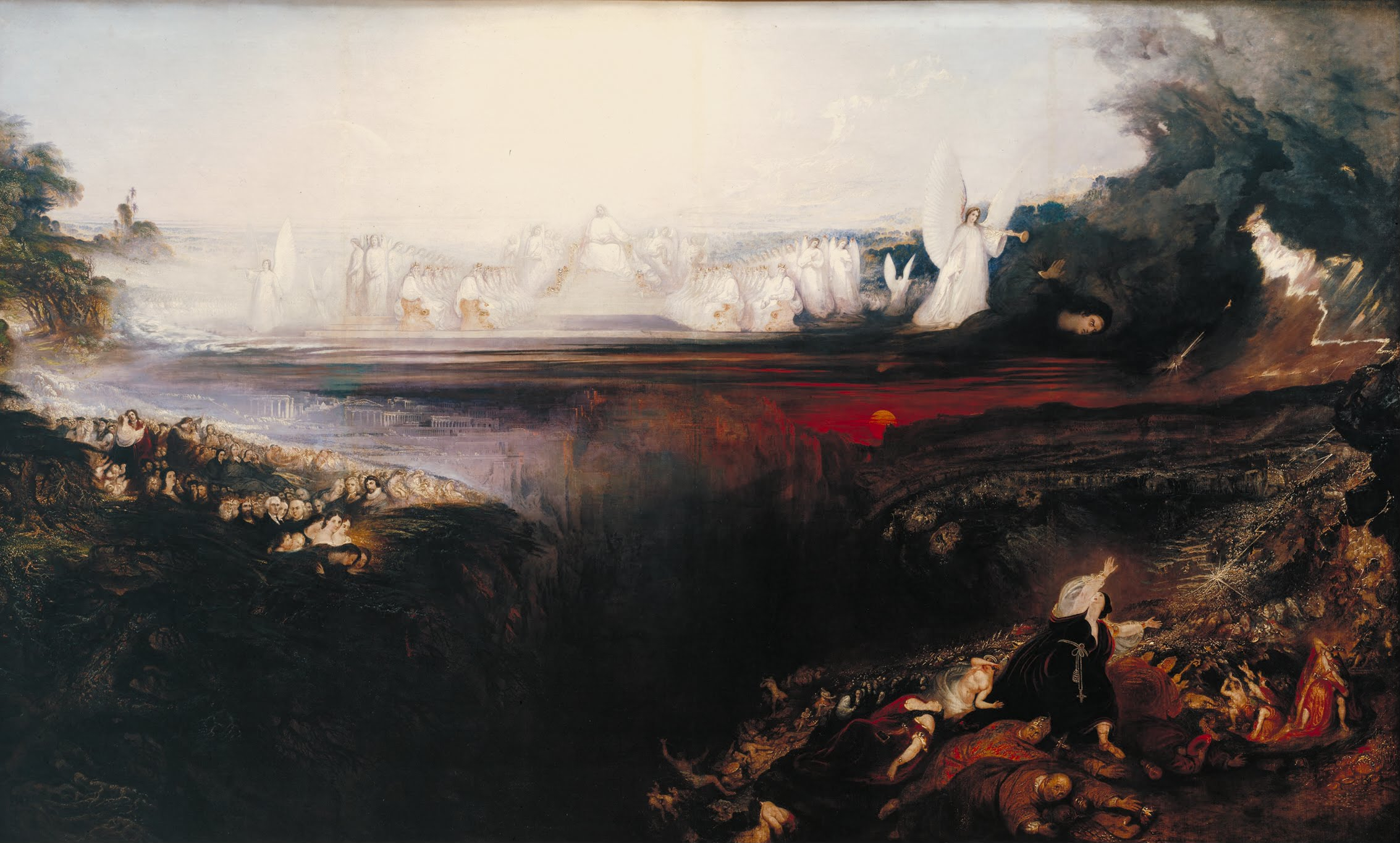
The Last Judgment by John Martin (1854)

- Second Coming
  - Predictions and claims for the Second Coming of Christ
  - Christian eschatology
  - Katechon
  - Second Coming in Mormonism
  - Seventh-day Adventist eschatology

== Relics ==
- Holy Prepuce
- Shroud of Turin
- Holy Grail

== Media featuring Jesus ==
=== Religious text ===
- Bible
- Quran

=== Dramatic portrayals of Jesus Christ ===
Dramatic portrayals of Jesus Christ where Jesus is the primary character

==== Films about Jesus ====
- Category:Films about Jesus
  - The Gospel of John (2003)
  - The Gospel of John (2014)
  - The Gospel According to St. Matthew
  - The Passion of Christ
  - Jesus (1999)
  - Son of God
- Category:Films about the Nativity of Jesus
  - Joseph & Mary
  - The Nativity Story

==== Plays about Jesus ====
- Oberammergau Passion Play

==== Musicals about Jesus ====
- Jesus Christ Superstar
- Godspell

==== Novels about Jesus ====
- Christ the Lord: Out of Egypt
- King Jesus

==== Series about Jesus ====
- The Chosen

=== Dramatic portrayals containing Jesus Christ ===
Dramatic portrayals of Jesus Christ that contain Jesus as a secondary character

==== Films containing Jesus ====
- Ben-Hur
- Monty Python's Life of Brian

=== Non-fiction books about Jesus ===
List of books about Jesus

- Beautiful Outlaw
- The Book of Nestor the Priest
- Caesar's Messiah
- The Christ Myth
- Christian Beginnings
- The Desire of Ages
- Did Jesus Exist?
- Jesus before Christianity
- The Jesus Dynasty
- The Jesus Family Tomb
- The Jesus I Never Knew
- Jesus in India
- Jesus of Nazareth: From the Baptism in the Jordan to the Transfiguration
- Jesus of Nazareth: Holy Week
- Jesus of Nazareth: The Infancy Narratives
- The Jesus Scroll
- Jesus the Christ
- Jesus the Jew
- Jesus the Magician
- Jesus the Man
- Jesus, Interrupted
- Jesus: A Portrait
- Jesus: Apocalyptic Prophet of the New Millennium
- Killing Jesus
- Kosher Jesus
- Life of Jesus
- The Life of Our Lord
- The Logia of Yeshua
- The Lord
- Man of Nazareth
- Modern Quest for the Historical Jesus Under the Influence of Psychiatry
- The Man Nobody Knows
- The Myth of God Incarnate
- The Pagan Christ
- The Passover Plot
- The Quest of the Historical Jesus
- The Shroud Conspiracy
- The Spirit of the Liturgy
- The Tomb of God
- Zealot: The Life and Times of Jesus of Nazareth

== Related religions ==
=== Before Jesus ===
- Outline of Judaism
- Zoroastrianism

=== After Jesus ===
- Neoplatonism and Christianity
- Outline of the Catholic Church
- Outline of Protestantism
- Outline of The Church of Jesus Christ of Latter-day Saints

== See also ==
- Outline of religion
  - Outline of Christianity
    - Outline of Bible-related topics
- Historical background of New Testament
- Images of Jesus
- Jesus and John the Baptist
- Jesus Movement
- Jesus of Nazareth
- Jesus-Only doctrine
- Visions of Jesus and Mary
