= Catholic prayers to Jesus =

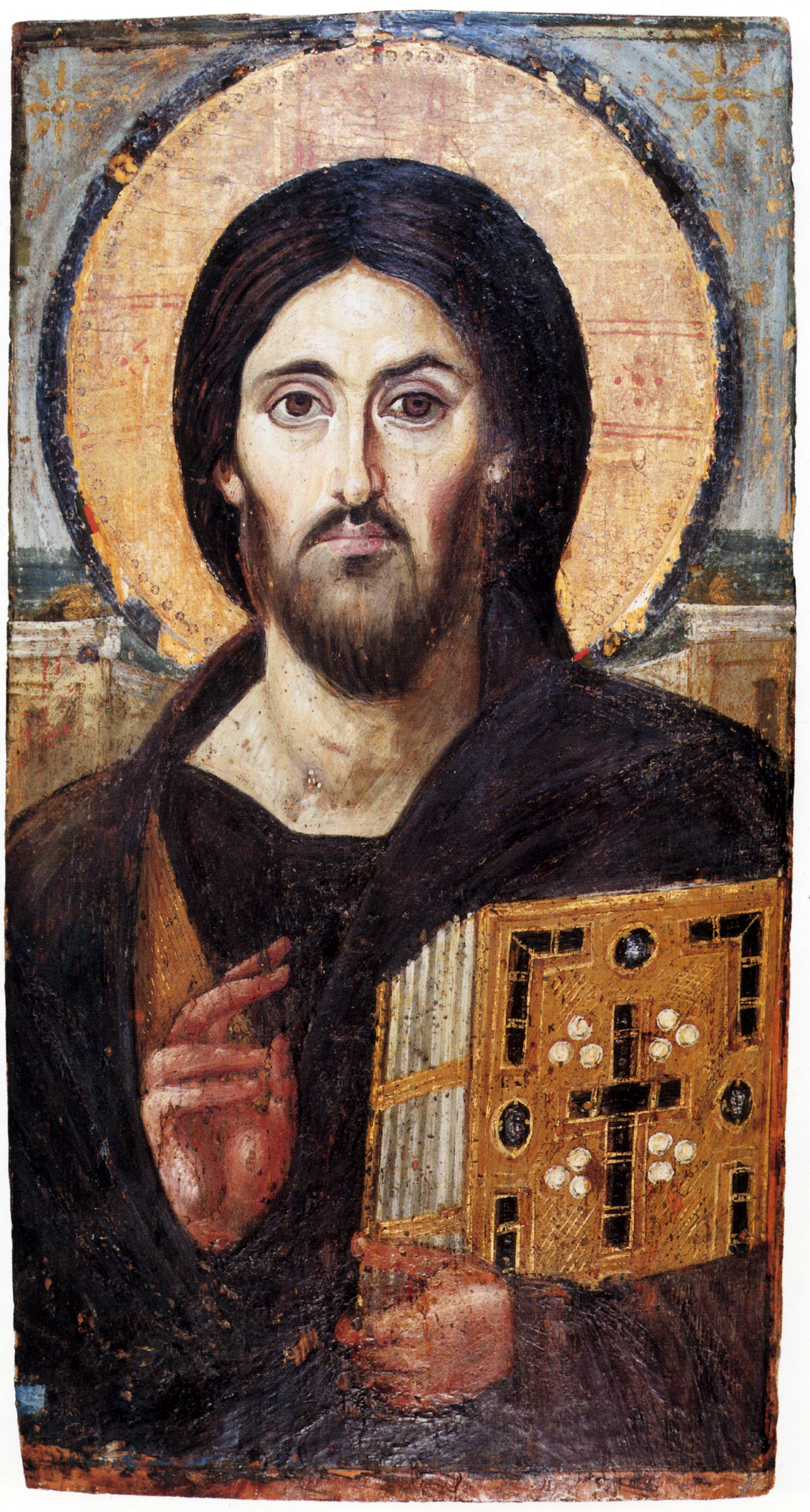
The oldest surviving panel icon of Christ Pantocrator, c. 6th century.

A number of prayers to Jesus Christ exist within the Roman Catholic tradition. These prayers have diverse origins and forms. Some were attributed to visions of saints, others were handed down by tradition.

Some such prayers are provided in the Raccolta Roman Catholic prayer book, first published in association with the Roman Catholic Congregation for Indulgences in 1807.

Various prayers listed in this article are due to saints, or have been used by saints (e.g. Augustine of Hippo, Ignatius of Loyola, Louis de Montfort, etc.) but they are usually not associated with a specific Catholic devotion with a feast day. They are therefore grouped separately from the prayers that accompany Roman Catholic devotions to Christ such as Holy Face of Jesus or the Divine Mercy.

In many cases specific promises and powers are attributed to specific prayers or devotions to Jesus although some prayers of reparation include no petition.

== Anima Christi ==
The literal meaning of Anima Christi is Soul of Christ. It dates back to the early fourteenth century or earlier. At some point in history it was attributed to St. Ignatius Loyola, who used it in his Spiritual Exercises, but it was later found in texts that predated St. Ignatius.

The sequence of sentences in Anima Christi have rich associations with Catholic concepts that relate to the Holy Eucharist (Body and Blood of Christ), Baptism (water) and the Passion of Jesus (Holy Wounds).

Jean-Baptiste Lully composed a Motet called Anima Christi, and musicians such as Giovanni Valentini performed it.

== Act of Consecration to the Sacred Heart of Jesus ==
The Act of Consecration to the Sacred Heart of Jesus is a 17th-century prayer by Saint Marguerite Marie Alacoque. It was part of the private revelations reported by her regarding the Sacred Heart of Jesus.

== Morning offering ==
The Morning offering to the Sacred Heart of Jesus prayer is meant to be prayed first thing in the morning. It was composed by Fr. Francois Xavier Gaulrelet in 1844 and reflects the Alliance of the Hearts of Jesus and Mary by referring to the Immaculate Heart of Mary:

O Jesus through the Immaculate Heart of Mary,
I offer you my prayers, works, joys, sufferings of this day,
in union with the Holy Sacrifice of the Mass throughout the world.
I offer them for all the intentions of your Sacred Heart:
the salvation of souls, the reparation for sin, the reunion of Christians;
and in particular for the intentions of the Holy Father this month.
Amen.

== Prayer of Consecration to the Sacred Heart of Jesus ==
Pope Leo XIII composed the Prayer of Consecration to the Sacred Heart of Jesus in 1899 and included it in his 1899 encyclical Annum sacrum which consecrated the entire world to the Sacred Heart of Jesus. The consecration was motivated by letters sent to the Pontiff by a Good Shepherd nun, Mary of the Divine Heart, who stated that in a vision of Jesus Christ she had been told to request the consecration.

== Prayer to the shoulder wound of Jesus ==
The Prayer to the shoulder wound of Jesus is attributed to Saint Bernard of Clairvaux According to St. Bernard, he asked Jesus which was His greatest unrecorded suffering and the wound that inflicted the most pain on Him in Calvary and Jesus answered:

"I had on My Shoulder, while I bore My Cross on the Way of Sorrows, a grievous Wound which was more painful than the others and which is not recorded by men. Honor this Wound with thy devotion and I will grant thee whatsoever thou dost ask through its virtue and merit".

The modern version of the prayer bears the imprimatur of Bishop Thomas D. Bevan, Diocese of Springfield, Mass. 1892.

== Saint John Vianney's prayer to Jesus ==
Saint John Vianney composed Saint John Vianney's prayer to Jesus to Jesus in the 19th century.

The prayer reflects Vianney's deep religious feelings, which were praised by Pope John XXIII in his encyclical Sacerdotii nostri primordia in 1959.

The prayer is quoted within the Catechism of the Catholic Church.

== You are Christ ==
The ancient prayer, You are Christ, was composed by St. Augustine of Hippo. This is a somewhat long prayer in three parts.

The first part is a list of titles and salutations to Jesus, namely: "my Holy Father, my Tender God, my Great King, my Good Shepherd... my Everlasting Salvation."

The second part involves a set of conversational questions, e.g. ".. why have I ever loved, why in my whole life have I ever desired anything except You, Jesus my God?..."

The third part is a list of petitions, namely "...may every good feeling that is fitted for Your praise, love You, delight in You,.... may I be found consummated with You!"

== Prayer of St. John Gabriel Perboyre to Jesus ==
Saint John Gabriel Perboyre, priest and martyr composed the Prayer of St. John Gabriel Perboyre to Jesus in the 19th century.

The theme of the prayer is to help transform oneself to be more like Jesus and to banish all that in unlike Jesus from one's heart, soul and memory. This transformational prayer builds towards Saint Paul's statement in Galatians 2:20: "I live - now not I - But Christ lives in me".

== Saint Louis de Montfort's Prayer to Jesus ==
The Saint Louis de Montfort's Prayer to Jesus is a reflection of Saint Louis de Montfort's philosophy of "total consecration to Jesus Christ through Mary" a theme that centuries later influenced the development of Roman Catholic Mariology.

Although St Louis is perhaps best known for his Mariology and devotion to the Blessed Virgin Mary, his spirituality is founded on the mystery of the Incarnation of Jesus Christ, and is centered on Christ, as reflected in his collected works God Alone.

As the prayer suggests St. Louis introduced the key concepts that underlie Roman Catholic Mariology today: that Jesus and Mary are son and mother, redeemer and redeemed and that the path to Jesus is through Mary. Theologically, the prayer reflects the inherent inclusion of Mariology in Christology.

== Prayer before a Crucifix ==
The Prayer before a Crucifix is usually said while kneeling before a crucifix. It is often said by Roman Catholics after Communion or after Mass.

The faithful receive a partial indulgence if they recite the prayer after Communion before a crucifix. On the Fridays of Lent, the indulgence is a plenary indulgence.

== See also ==
- Devotions to Jesus Christ
- Lectio Divina
- Roman Catholic prayer
