= Thanksgiving after Communion =

Christian spiritual practice

Thanksgiving after Communion is a spiritual practice among Christians after receiving Holy Communion, in which they maintain themselves in prayer for some time to thank God and especially listen in their hearts for guidance. This practice was and is highly recommended by saints, theologians, and Doctors of the Church.

== Basis of the practice ==
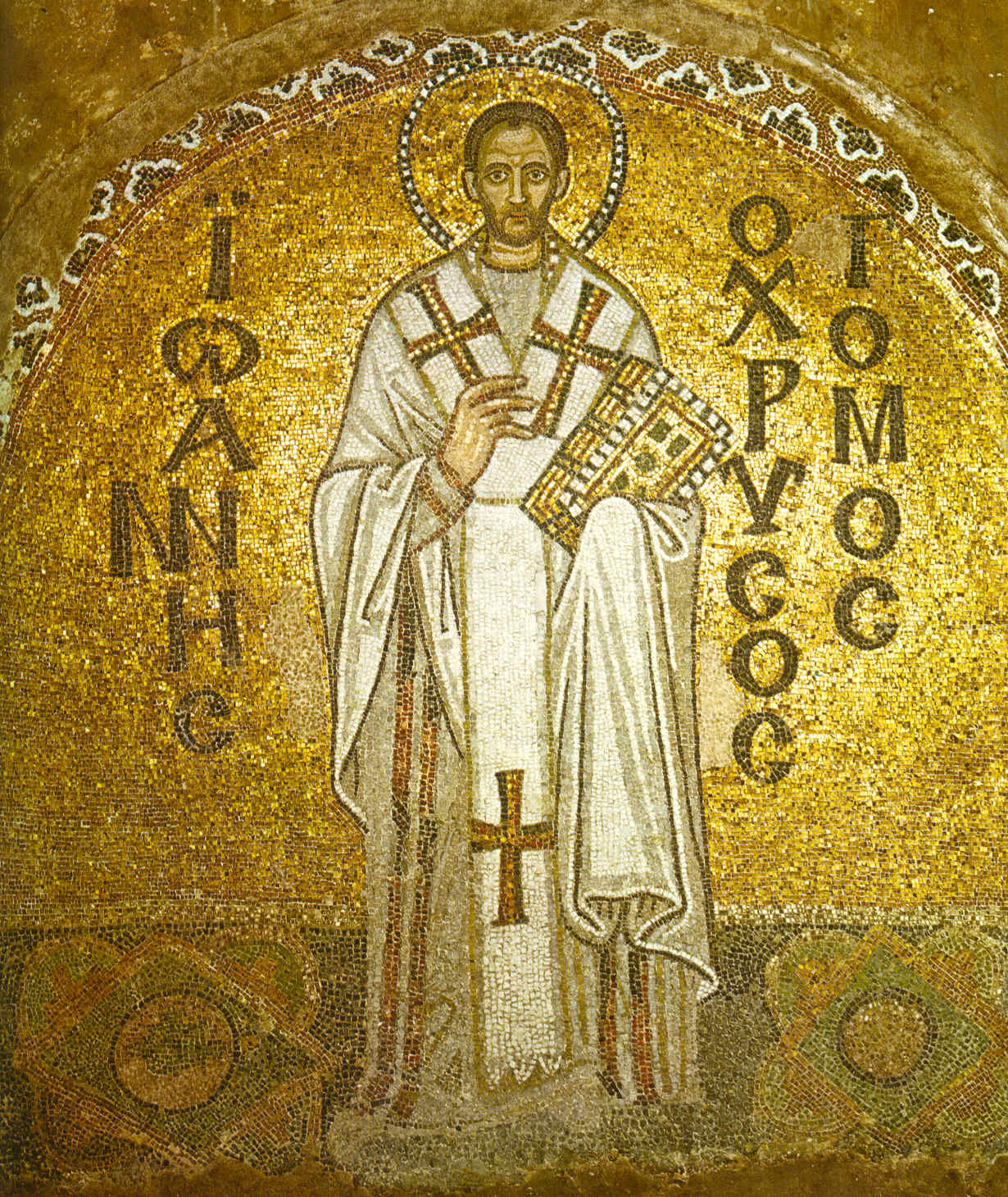
St. John Chrysostom: "When we have received the precious Body of Jesus Christ, we should take care not to lose its heavenly flavor by turning too soon to the cares and business of the world."

In John 6:51, Jesus is quoted as saying, "I am the living bread that came down from heaven; whoever eats this bread will live forever; and the bread that I will give is my flesh for the life of the world." According to Catholic doctrine, bread is transubstantiated into the "Body and Blood, Soul and Divinity of Jesus Christ." The same holds true for the wine, which in Catholic doctrine is also "the Body, Blood, Soul, and Divinity of Jesus Christ".

Pope John-Paul II in Inaestimabile Donum (Instruction Concerning Worship of the Eucharistic Mystery) emphasized the importance of adoration and prayer after Holy Communion.

Reverence is that virtue which inclines a person to show honor and respect to God. According to Francis Cardinal Arinze, prefect of the Congregation for Divine Worship and the Discipline of the Sacraments,

Thanksgiving after Mass has traditionally been greatly esteemed in the Church for both the priest and the lay faithful. The missal and the breviary even suggest prayers for the priest before and after the Eucharistic celebration. There is no reason to believe that this is no longer needed. Indeed in our noisy world of today, such moments of reflective and loving prayers would seem indicated more than even before.

Pope Benedict XVI in Sacramentum Caritatis referred to the "precious time of thanksgiving after communion," urging everyone to preserve the importance of Communion as "a personal encounter with the Lord Jesus in the sacrament." He recommended that during this time "it can also be most helpful to remain recollected in silence."

== Practice of the saints ==
St. Thomas Aquinas (+1274) composed a Prayer of Thanksgiving after Communion that became a classic:

I thank You, O holy Lord, almighty Father, eternal God, who have deigned, not through any merits of mine, but out of the condescension of Your goodness, to satisfy me a sinner, Your unworthy servant, with the precious Body and Blood of Your Son, our Lord Jesus Christ. I pray that this Holy Communion be not a condemnation to punishment for me, but a saving plea to forgiveness. May it be to me the armor of faith and the shield of a good will. May it be the emptying out of my vices and the extinction of all lustful desires; and increase of charity and patience, of humility and obedience, and all virtues; a strong defense against the snares of all my enemies, visible and invisible; the perfect quieting of all my evil impulses of flesh and spirit, binding me firmly to You, the one true God; and a happy ending of my life. I pray too that You will deign to bring me, a sinner, to that ineffable banquet where You with Your Son and the Holy Spirit, are to your Saints true light, fulfillment of desires, eternal joy, unalloyed gladness, and perfect bliss. Through the same Christ our Lord. Amen.

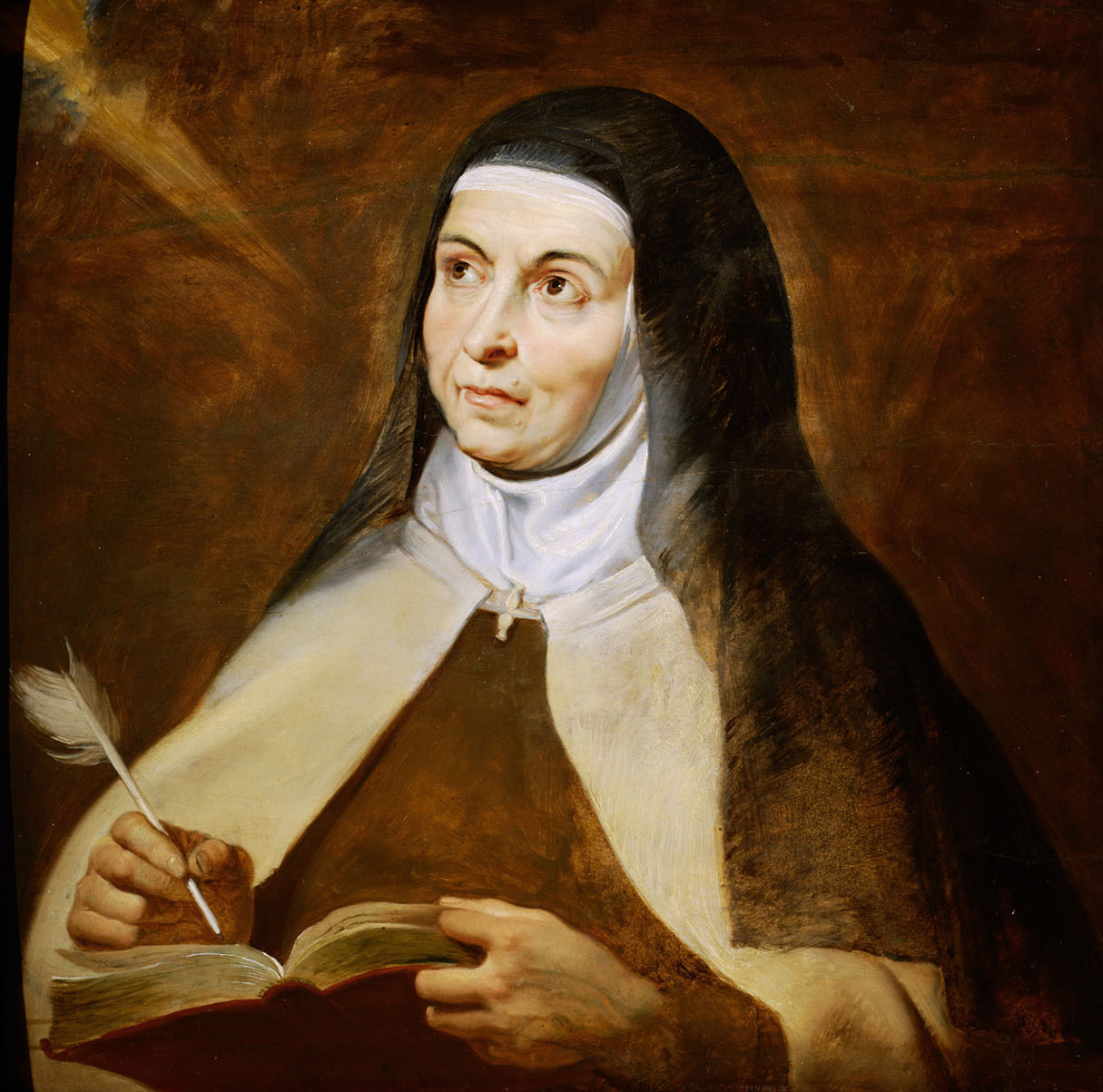
Teresa of Ávila

After receiving Communion, many of the saints would spend an extended time of thanksgiving. Magdalena de Pazzi wrote, "The minutes that follow Communion are the most precious we have in our lives." St. Teresa of Ávila urged her daughters not to rush out after Mass but to treasure the opportunity for thanksgiving: "Let us detain ourselves lovingly with Jesus," she said, "and not waste the hour that follows Communion." St. Louis de Montfort wrote, "I would not give up this hour of Thanksgiving even for an hour of Paradise."

Philip Neri once sent two acolytes with candles to accompany a member of his congregation who had left the church without any adoration after Mass. The man returned to the church to find out St. Philip's purpose. The Saint answered, "We have to pay proper respect to Our Lord, Whom you are carrying away with you. Since you neglect to adore Him, I sent two acolytes to take your place."

== Length of time ==
According to the Baltimore Catechism, Roman Catholics "should spend sufficient time in Thanksgiving after Holy Communion to show due reverence to the Blessed Sacrament; for Our Lord is personally with us as long as the appearance of bread and wine remains."

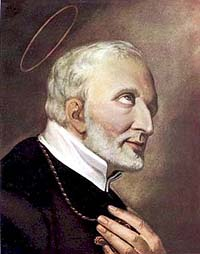
Alphonsus Liguori

Through the years, the saints have varied in their recommendation as regards the amount of time to be spent in thanksgiving. Daily Communion only became the practice after a decree of Pope Pius X in 1905. A number of saints referred to an hour of thanksgiving. St. Alphonsus specifically advises everyone to devote at least half an hour to it, if it is at all possible. "There is no prayer more agreeable to God, or more profitable to the soul," said another Doctor of the Church, St. Alphonsus Liguori, "than that which is made during the thanksgiving after Communion."

St. Josemaría Escrivá said: "Surely you have nothing so important on that you cannot give Our Lord 10 minutes to say thanks. Love is repaid with love."

== Prayer during thanksgiving ==
According to Daniel A. Lord, SJ, thanksgiving after Holy Communion always supposes a "realization of who is present in our hearts: Jesus Christ, God-man, lover of souls, divinely powerful, humanly tender, with grace in His hands and the keenest possible interest in His heart for the one who has just received Him." Traditional post-communion prayers include the Adoro te by Thomas Aquinas, the Anima Christi, the Prayer Before a Crucifix, and the Prayer of Saint Francis.

=== Catholic ===
According to Fr. Carlos Belmonte, author of Understanding the Mass,

The content of our thanksgiving will be just a continuation of the sentiments and affections we have felt – or tried to foster in ourselves – during the Mass, but perhaps in an atmosphere of greater intimacy this time. Sometimes, acts of faith, hope, and charity addressed to the three divine Persons will spurt from our soul. At other times, we will maintain an intimate dialogue with Jesus, our divine Friend who will purify and transform us. Or perhaps, we will just be sitting still, in silent adoration, in the same manner that a mother watches over her son who has fallen asleep. We should not look for prayers or formulas, if we do not find any need for them. But if we realize they can help us, we should overcome our laziness (say, to open our missal and read the prayers for thanksgiving there), or that subtle kind of vanity which makes us feel humiliated by having to read prayers composed by somebody else.

One of the recommended texts for thanksgiving in My Daily Psalm Book (1947), arranged by Joseph Frey, CSSP, is the Canticle of the Three Young men, or Trium Puerorum. This is a traditional canticle that is included in the prayers for thanksgiving in the Roman Missal of 1962.

All things the Lord has made, bless the Lord.
Angels of the Lord! all bless the Lord.
Sun and moon! bless the Lord.
Stars of heaven! bless the Lord.
Showers and dews! all bless the Lord.
Winds! all bless the Lord.
Fire and heat! bless the Lord.
Dews and sleet! bless the Lord.
Light and darkness! bless the Lord.
Lightning and clouds! bless the Lord.
Mountains and hills! bless the Lord.
Every thing that grows on the earth! bless the Lord.
Let us praise and exalt him above all for ever.

There is also the "Universal Prayer" attributed to Pope Clement XI, which begins: "Lord, I believe in you: increase my faith. I trust in you: strengthen my trust. I love you: let me love you more and more. I am sorry for my sins: deepen my sorrow."

=== Lutheran ===
Among Lutheran denominations, the following prayer may be said silently following the reception of the Eucharist:

Almighty and everlasting God, I thank and praise you for feeding me with the life-giving body and blood of your beloved son Jesus Christ. Send your Holy Spirit that, having with my mouth received the holy Sacrament, I may by faith obtain and eternally enjoy your divine grace, the forgiveness of sins, unity with Christ, and everlasting life; through Jesus Christ my Lord. Amen.

— Lutheran Service Book

=== Anglican ===
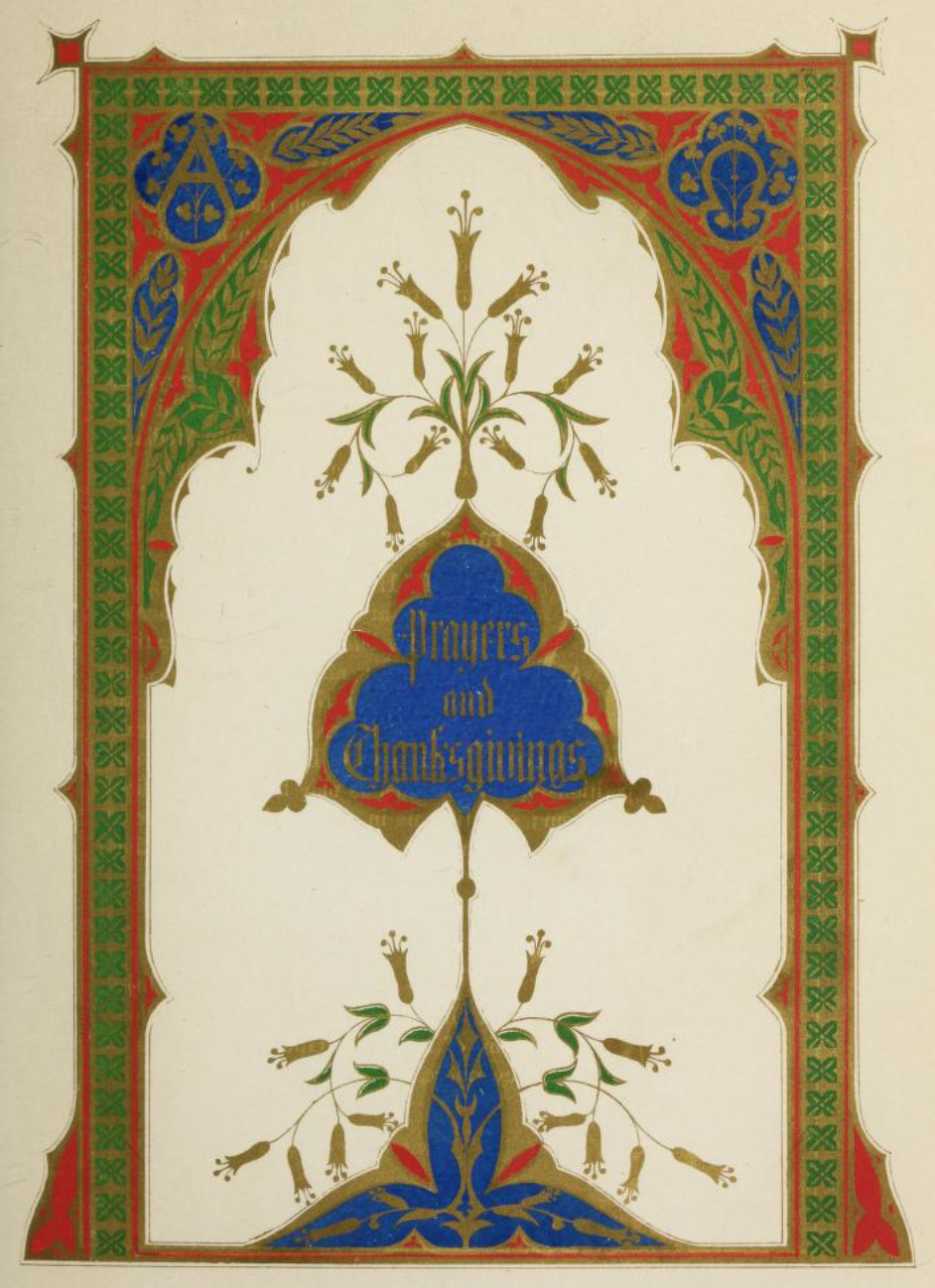
Illuminated title of "Prayers and Thanksgivings" from the 1845 illustrated Book of Common Prayer.

In the Anglican Communion and in the Catholic Personal Ordinariates, the following post-communion prayer, or a variant of it, is said:

Almighty and everliving God, we most heartily thank thee, for that thou dost vouchsafe to feed us, who have duly received these holy mysteries, with the spiritual food of the most precious Body and Blood of thy Son our Saviour Jesus Christ; and dost assure us thereby of thy favour and goodness towards us; and that we are very members incorporate in the mystical body of thy Son, which is the blessed company of all faithful people; and are also heirs through hope of thy everlasting kingdom, by the merits of the most precious death and passion of thy dear Son. And we most humbly beseech thee, O heavenly Father, so to assist us with thy grace, that we may continue in that holy fellowship, and do all such good works as thou hast prepared for us to walk in; through Jesus Christ our Lord, to whom, with thee and the Holy Ghost, be all honour and glory, world without end. Amen.

— 1662 Book of Common Prayer

In many Anglican Churches since the 1980s, the following has been a common post-communion prayer:

Father of all, we give you thanks and praise that, when we were still far off, you met us in your Son and brought us home. Dying and living, he declared your love, gave us grace and opened the gate of glory. May we who share Christ’s body live his risen life; we who drink his cup bring life to others; we whom the Spirit lights give light to the world. Keep us firm in the hope you have set before us so we and all your children shall be free and the whole earth live to praise your name, through Christ our Lord. Amen.

— Common Worship

=== Eastern Orthodox ===
In the Eastern Orthodox Church there are various sets of prayers recommended both for Preparation for Communion and for Thanksgiving After Communion. The specific form will differ depending upon national jurisdiction. However, the thanksgiving rite is more uniformly accepted across jurisdictions than the preparation rite.

Through the centuries, several prayers have been composed for this. Symeon Metaphrastes (probably 10th century) who is venerated by the Eastern Orthodox Church as a saint, and who is known for his Byzantine hagiography, composed the following Prayer of Thanksgiving after Communion which is found in the Hieratikon, or prayers for the priest.

O Thou who didst gladly give me Thy flesh for nourishment; who art fire to consume the unworthy: Burn me not, O my Creator, but search out my members. Quicken my reins and my heart. Let Thy flames devour the thorns of all my transgressions. Purify my soul. Sanctify my thoughts. Knit firm my bones. Enlighten my senses. Piece me with Thy fear. Be Thou my continual shield. Watch over and preserve me from every word and deed that corrupt the soul. Purge me and wash me clean and adorn me. Order my ways, give me understanding and enlighten me. Make me the temple of Thy Holy Ghost, and no more the habitation of sin, that as from fire all evil, every passion, may flee from me, who through Holy Communion am become a place for Thy dwelling. I bring unto Thee all the saints to make intercession: The ranks of the heavenly hosts; Thy forerunner; the wise Apostles; and withal Thy pure and holy Mother. Their prayers receive, O merciful Christ, and make Thy servant a child of light. For Thou art our hallowing, Thou only art the brightness of our souls, O gracious Lord: And we rightly give glory to Thee, our Lord and our God, All the days of our life. Amen.

In the Russian Orthodox Church there are usually a set of five prayers that are recited after the conclusion of the Divine Liturgy. After the dismissal of the Liturgy, those who have received Holy Communion will remain behind and pray as the prayers are recited by a Reader. The priest and other celebrating clergy will usually say the Prayers of Thanksgiving immediately after receiving Holy Communion. However, the deacon who will perform the ablutions will wait to say them after he has finished his duties at the Table of Oblation.

Among the prayers said is one by Saint Basil the Great:

O Master Christ God, King of the ages and Creator of all things, I thank Thee for all the good things which Thou hast bestowed upon me, and for the communion of Thy most pure and life-creating Mysteries. I pray Thee, therefore, O Good One and Lover of mankind: Keep me under Thy protection and in the shadow of Thy wings; and grant me, even until my last breath, to partake worthily and with a pure conscience, of Thy Holy Things, unto the remission of sins and life eternal. For Thou art the Bread of life, the Source of holiness, the Giver of good things; and unto Thee do we send up glory, together with the Father and the Holy Spirit, now and ever, and unto the ages of ages. Amen.

The prayers usually end with the Nunc Dimittis and the Troparion and Kontakion of the saint who wrote the Liturgy that was celebrated (John Chrysostom, Basil the Great, Gregory Dialogist or, rarely, James the Brother of the Lord). Then the rite ends with a dismissal pronounced by the priest.

After the Prayers of Thanksgiving, the communicant should spend the rest of the day in a spirit of thanksgiving, engaging only in activities which are of benefit to the soul. If it is a Sunday or Holy Day he should rest from labour.

=== Anabaptist ===
A Devoted Christian's Prayer Book, widely used in Conservative Anabaptist and Old Order Anabaptist churches, provides the following prayer following the reception of the Lord's Supper:

THANKS FOR THE BREAD

O Lord, Almighty God, loving heavenly Father, because Thou loved us so greatly Thou hast given Thy dear Son, Jesus Christ, to redeem us from eternal death. Feed our hungry souls with Thy heavenly bread unto eternal life. We praise and thank Thee for Thy grace that called us poor mortals to this blessed communion. To Thy Son, Jesus Christ, our Redeemer, be all praise and honor and glory in eternity. Amen.

THANKS FOR RECEIVING THE CUP

O Lord, Almighty God, loving heavenly Father, Thou hast led us out from sin by the hand of Thy Son, Jesus Christ, the one great Shepherd of Thy sheep, who shed His blood on Calvary as an everlasting atonement for our sins. Through grace Thou hast called us to this blessed communion, for which we praise and thank Thee forever, in the name of Thy Son, Jesus Christ. Amen.

== See also ==
- Anima Christi
- Eucharistic discipline
- Prayer Before a Crucifix
- Prayer of Saint Francis
