= Christian praise and worship =

Christian praise and worship may refer to:

- Christian worship, the practice of worship in Christianity
- Contemporary worship, a form of Christian worship
  - Contemporary worship music, a subgenre of contemporary Christian music

== See also ==
- Contemporary Christian worship (disambiguation)
- Praise and worship (disambiguation)
