= Worship (disambiguation) =

Worship is an act of religious devotion usually directed towards a deity

Worship may also refer to:

- Worship (style), an honorific prefix

== Entertainment ==
- "Worship", an episode of The Powerpuff Girls

== Music ==
- Worship, a Roman Catholic hymnal; see List of hymnals
- Contemporary worship music
- Worship (Michael W. Smith album), 2001
- Worship (A Place to Bury Strangers album), 2012
- Worship (Hypocrisy album), 2021
- "Worship", a song by English band Years & Years from their 2015 album Communion
- "Worship", a song by American singer Lizzo from her 2016 EP Coconut Oil
- "Worship", a song by Australian band Golden Features from their 2018 album Sect
- "Worship", an instrumental by American band Anthrax from their 2011 album Worship Music

== See also ==
- Praise and worship (disambiguation)
- Worship Music (disambiguation)
