= Songs of Praise (disambiguation) =

Songs of Praise is a BBC television programme.

Songs of Praise may also refer to:

- Songs of Praise (hymnal), a 1925 hymnal
- Songs of Praise (The Adicts album), a 1981 album
- Songs of Praise (Shame album), a 2018 album
- Songs of Praise, a 1973 album by Shuli Natan
- "Songs of Praise" (The Vicar of Dibley), a 1994 television episode

== See also ==
- Praise (disambiguation)
