= Contemporary Christian worship =

Contemporary Christian worship may refer to:

- Present day practices in Christian worship generally
- Contemporary worship, a form of Christian worship
  - Contemporary worship music, a subgenre of contemporary Christian music

== See also ==
- Christian praise and worship (disambiguation)
