= Catholic devotions to Jesus =

Popular prayer forms of Roman Catholics

The Roman Catholic tradition includes a number of devotions to Jesus Christ. Like all Catholic devotions, these prayer forms are not part of the official public liturgy of the church but are based on the popular spiritual practices of Roman Catholics. Many are officially approved by the Holy See as suitable for spiritual growth but not necessary for salvation.

Some devotions arise from private revelations, or personal religious experiences of saints. The church has a tradition of thorough investigation of such private revelations and the lives of candidates for sainthood to assure that no natural or scientific explanation can, at the time of investigation, account for any miracles involved. Often an approved devotion of the church relates to a particular prayer form, or an image.

== Devotion to the Holy Name of Jesus ==
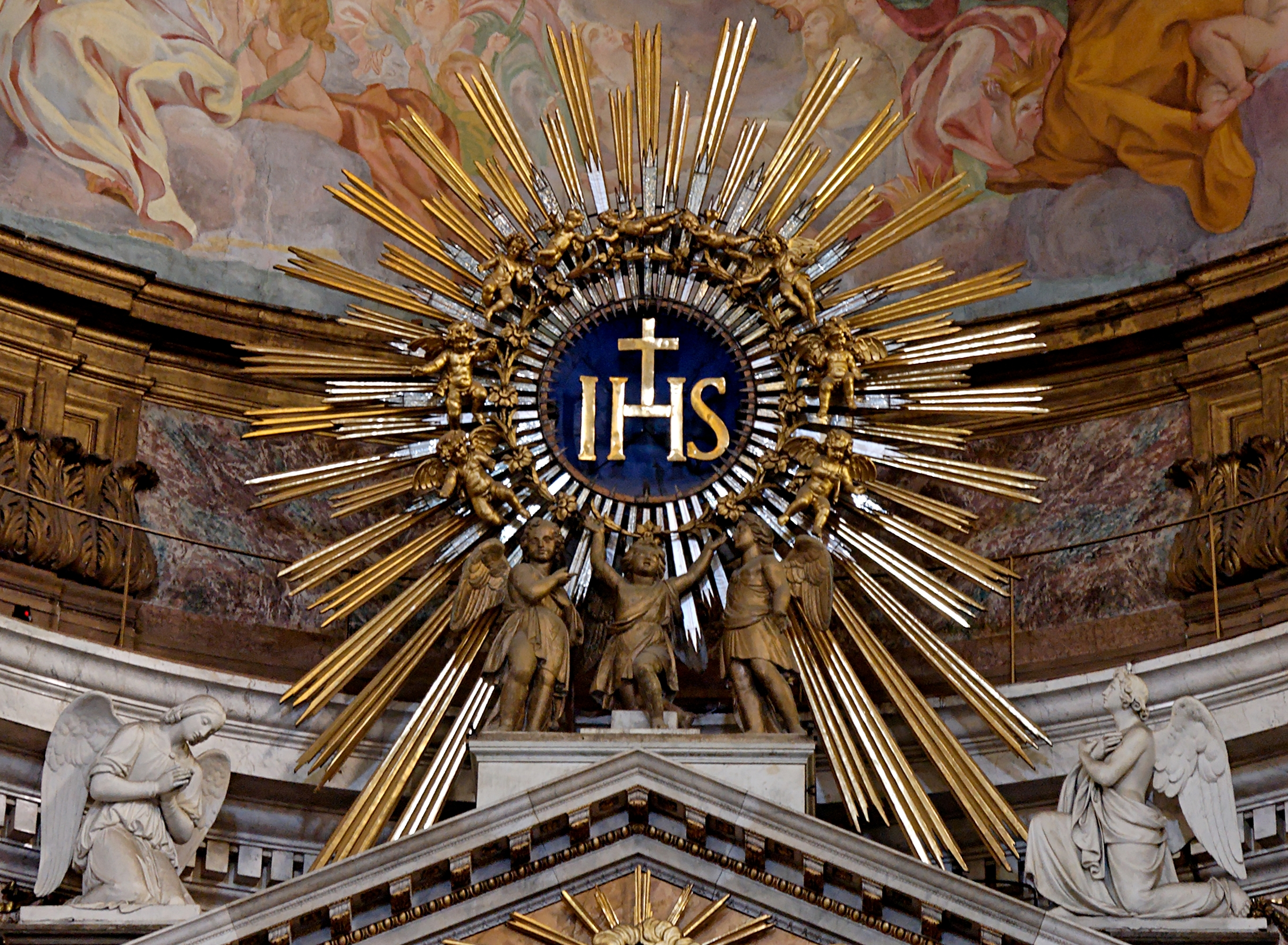
IHS monogram, with kneeling angels, atop the main altar, Church of the Gesù, Rome

Devotion to the Holy Name of Jesus exists both in Eastern and Western Christianity. The reverence and affection with which Christians have regarded the Holy Name of Jesus goes back to the earliest days of Christianity.

For centuries, Christians have invoked the Holy Name, and some have believed that there is intrinsic power in the name of Jesus. The feast day is celebrated in various Christian churches either as the Feast of the Holy Name of Jesus or as that of Circumcision of Jesus. The month of January is dedicated to the Holy Name of Jesus. The Litany of the Holy Name is an old and popular form of prayer in honor of the Name of Jesus. The author is not known. It probably dates back to the beginning of the 15th century as a private devotion, and was formally approved for public recitation in 1862 by Pope Pius IX.

== Infant Jesus of Prague ==
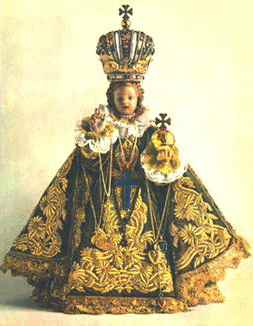
Infant Jesus of Prague

The Infant Jesus of Prague is a famous statue of infant Jesus in the Church of Our Lady Victorious in Malá Strana, Prague. In 1639, the residents of Prague credited the Infant Jesus for protecting the city during a siege by Swedish troops. The tradition of the Infant Jesus procession and coronation continues to this day. Devotion to Jesus under the title Infant of Prague spread. It is popular in Ireland under the name "Child of Prague".

A customary practice is to make a Christmas novena to the Infant of Prague from December 16–24. The Feast of the Holy Name of Jesus is the principal feast of the miraculous Infant. Similarly, the Santo Bambino of Aracoeli is venerated in Rome.

== Eucharistic adoration ==
One of the first possible references to reserving the Blessed Sacrament for adoration is found in a life of St. Basil (d. 379). The Franciscan archives credit Saint Francis of Assisi (d. 1226) with starting Eucharistic Adoration in Italy. The lay practice of adoration formally began in Avignon, France on 11 September 1226. The Venerable Leo Dupont initiated the nightly adoration of the Blessed Sacrament in Tours in 1849, from where it spread within France.

Eucharistic adoration may take place in the context of the liturgical rite of Exposition of the Blessed Sacrament or an informal "visit" to pray before the tabernacle. While psalms, readings and music may be part of the liturgical service, in common practice silent contemplation and reflection tend to predominate. Exposition of the Blessed Sacrament generally concludes with Benediction.

=== Holy Hour ===
The Holy Hour devotion consists of an hour spent in Eucharistic adoration or in prayer in the presence of the Blessed Sacrament. The inspiration for the Holy Hour is Matthew 26:40, when, in the Garden of Gethsemane Jesus asks Peter, "So, could you men not keep watch with me for an hour?"

=== Corpus Christi ===
In 1264 Pope Urban IV instituted the Feast of Corpus Christi ("the Body of Christ"), which celebrates the Real Presence of Jesus in the Eucharist and is liturgically celebrated on the Thursday after Trinity Sunday (or the following Sunday). It is customary to hold a procession of the Blessed Sacrament. The procession is followed by Benediction of the Blessed Sacrament. During the procession, the consecrated host is displayed in a monstrance held aloft by a member of the clergy. The procession then concludes with Benediction.

== Stations of the Cross ==
The Stations of the Cross (Latin: Via Crucis, lit. 'Way of the Cross') are depictions of the final hours (or Passion) of Jesus Christ, These fourteen stations are a chapel devotion that first created by St. Francis of Assisi and extended throughout the Roman Catholic Church in the medieval period. It became popular in the eleventh century, at a time when much Christian attention was focused on the Holy Land but few were able to actually visit. Great numbers of Europeans found an equivalent to walking the Via Dolorosa in following Christ's footsteps in spirit. This devotion is traditionally observed on Fridays during Lent, as well as on Good Friday, but may be prayed at any time. Many will use meditations composed by St. Alphonsus Ligouri, or the scriptural references or other texts, or simply contemplate the depicted event in the life of Jesus.

== Holy Face of Jesus ==
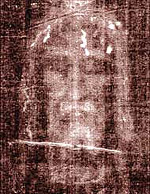
Secondo Pia's negative of the image on the Shroud of Turin, used in the devotion to the Holy Face of Jesus

Belief in the existence of authentic images of Christ is connected with the old legend of Abgar of Edessa and the apocryphal writing known as the "Mors Pilati". The oldest and best known of these images, it was called vera icon ('true image'), which ordinary language soon made Veronica.

In 1843, Sister Marie of St Peter, a Carmelite nun in Tours, France, reported visions of Jesus and Mary in which she was urged to spread the devotion to the Holy Face of Jesus, in reparation for the many insults Jesus suffered in his Passion. The devotion was further spread by the efforts of the Venerable Leo Dupont (known as the Apostle of the Holy Face). The devotion was initiated shortly before Dupont's death and later influenced Saint Therese of Lisieux. Pope Leo XIII approved of the devotion in 1885.

In 1936, Sister Maria Pierina de Micheli, a nun from Milan in Italy, reported a vision in which Jesus told her: "I will that My Face, which reflects the intimate pains of My Spirit, the suffering and the love of My Heart, be more honored. He who meditates upon Me, consoles Me". Further visions reportedly urged her to make a medal with the Holy Face based on the image from Secondo Pia's photograph of the Shroud of Turin. In 1958, Pope Pius XII approved of the devotion and the Holy Face medal and allowed for the remembrance of the Holy Face of Jesus on Shrove Tuesday (the Tuesday before Ash Wednesday) for all Roman Catholics.

== Sacred Heart ==
Devotion to the Sacred Heart of Jesus is based on the heart as a symbol of his love for humanity. In Roman Catholicism, the Sacred Heart has been closely associated with Acts of Reparation to Jesus Christ. In his encyclical Miserentissimus Redemptor Pope Pius XI stated: "the spirit of expiation or reparation has always had the first and foremost place in the worship given to the Most Sacred Heart of Jesus".

Formal references to this devotion first appeared in the 11th and 12th centuries. However, the most significant source for the devotion to the Sacred Heart in its present form was Visitandine Saint Margaret Mary Alacoque (1647–1690), who claimed to have received a series of private revelations from 1673 to 1675.

From this developed the First Friday Devotion. The devotion consists of several practices that are performed on the first Fridays of nine consecutive months. On these days, a person is to attend Mass and receive Communion. If the need arises, in order to receive Communion in a state of grace, a person should also make use of the Sacrament of Penance before attending Mass. In many Catholic communities the practice of the Holy Hour of meditation during the Exposition of the Blessed Sacrament during the First Fridays is encouraged.

The Feast of the Sacred Heart is now a holy day in the Roman Catholic liturgical calendar, and is celebrated 19 days after Pentecost. The month of June is dedicated to the Sacred Heart of Jesus.

== Precious Blood ==
The devotion to the Precious Blood was a special phenomenon of Flemish piety in the 15th and 16th centuries, that gave rise to the iconic image of Grace as the "Fountain of Life," filled with blood, pouring from the wounded "Lamb of God" or the "Holy Wounds" of Christ. The image, which was the subject of numerous Flemish paintings, was in part spurred by the renowned relic of the Precious Blood, which had been noted in Bruges since the twelfth century and which gave rise, from the late 13th century, to the observances, particular to Bruges, of the procession of the "Saint Sang" from its chapel. It was also particularly propagated by Gaspar del Bufalo, founder of the Missionaries of the Precious Blood.

The Feast of the Most Precious Blood, formerly celebrated on the first Sunday in July, was removed from the General Roman Calendar in 1969, "because the Most Precious Blood of Christ the Redeemer is already venerated in the solemnities of the Passion, of Corpus Christi, of the Sacred Heart of Jesus, and in the feast of the Exaltation of the Holy Cross. But the Mass of the Most Precious Blood of Our Lord Jesus Christ is placed among the votive Masses". The month of July is traditionally dedicated to the Most Precious Blood of Jesus.

== Holy Wounds ==
The Crusades brought a renewed enthusiasm for religious devotion, especially for the Passion of Christ. The five Holy Wounds of Christ were the five piercing wounds inflicted upon Jesus during his crucifixion.

Among specific devotions to the Holy Wounds are the Redemptorist's, Chaplet of the Five Wounds of Jesus, the Passionist Chaplet of the Five Wounds, and the Rosary of the Holy Wounds (also called the Chaplet of Holy Wounds), first introduced at the beginning of the 20th century by the Venerable Sister Marie Martha Chambon, a lay Roman Catholic Sister of the Monastery of the Visitation Order in Chambéry, France.

There is a separate devotion regarding the shoulder wound of Jesus. The relevant prayer calls to mind the wound he is said to have received during the carrying of his cross. It is variously attributed to Bernard of Clairvaux, St. Gertrude, or St. Mechtilde. The shoulder wound did not inspire as significant a devotional following as the wound in the side "...with its direct access to Christ's heart."

== Divine Mercy ==
The Divine Mercy is a devotion associated with reputed apparitions of Jesus revealed to Saint Faustina Kowalska. The Roman Catholic devotion and venerated image under this Christological title refers to the unlimited merciful love of God towards all people. There are a number of elements of this devotion, among which are: the devotional Divine Mercy image, the Chaplet of the Divine Mercy, and the observance of Divine Mercy Sunday. Pope John Paul II was instrumental in the formal establishment of the Divine Mercy devotion and acknowledged the efforts of the Marian Fathers in its promotion.

== Acts of reparation ==
Reparation is a theological concept closely connected with those of atonement and satisfaction. In ascetical theology, reparation is the making of amends for insults given to God through sin, either one's own or another's. Some devotions have the form of acts of reparation for the sufferings and insults that Jesus endured during his Passion or for the sin of blasphemy. Pope John Paul II referred to Acts of Reparation to Jesus Christ as the "unceasing effort to stand beside the endless crosses on which the Son of God continues to be crucified". Pope Pius XI called these Acts of Reparation "some sort of compensation to be rendered for the injury" with respect to the sufferings of Jesus.

== See also ==
- Holy Infant of Good Health
- Prayer in the Catholic Church
- First Thursdays Devotion
- First Fridays Devotion
