= Prayer before a crucifix =

Roman Catholic prayer recited on after Mass

The prayer before a crucifix is a Roman Catholic prayer to Jesus. It is often said by Roman Catholics after Eucharist or Mass. The faithful receive a partial indulgence if they recite the prayer after Communion before a crucifix. On the Fridays of Lent, the indulgence is a plenary indulgence.

== History ==
Throughout Christendom, believers have hung or painted a Christian cross, which they prostrate in front of, on the eastern wall of their home in order to indicate the eastward direction of prayer, as an "expression of their undying belief in the coming again of Jesus was united to their conviction that the cross, 'the sign of the Son of Man,' would appear in the eastern heavens on his return (see Matthew 24:30)."

The original prayer dates to about 1205 and is commonly ascribed to Francis of Assisi while at San Damiano. The prayer echoes Psalm 22:17-18; it may also have been influenced by the opening prayer of the Eucharistic liturgy.

== Words of the prayer ==
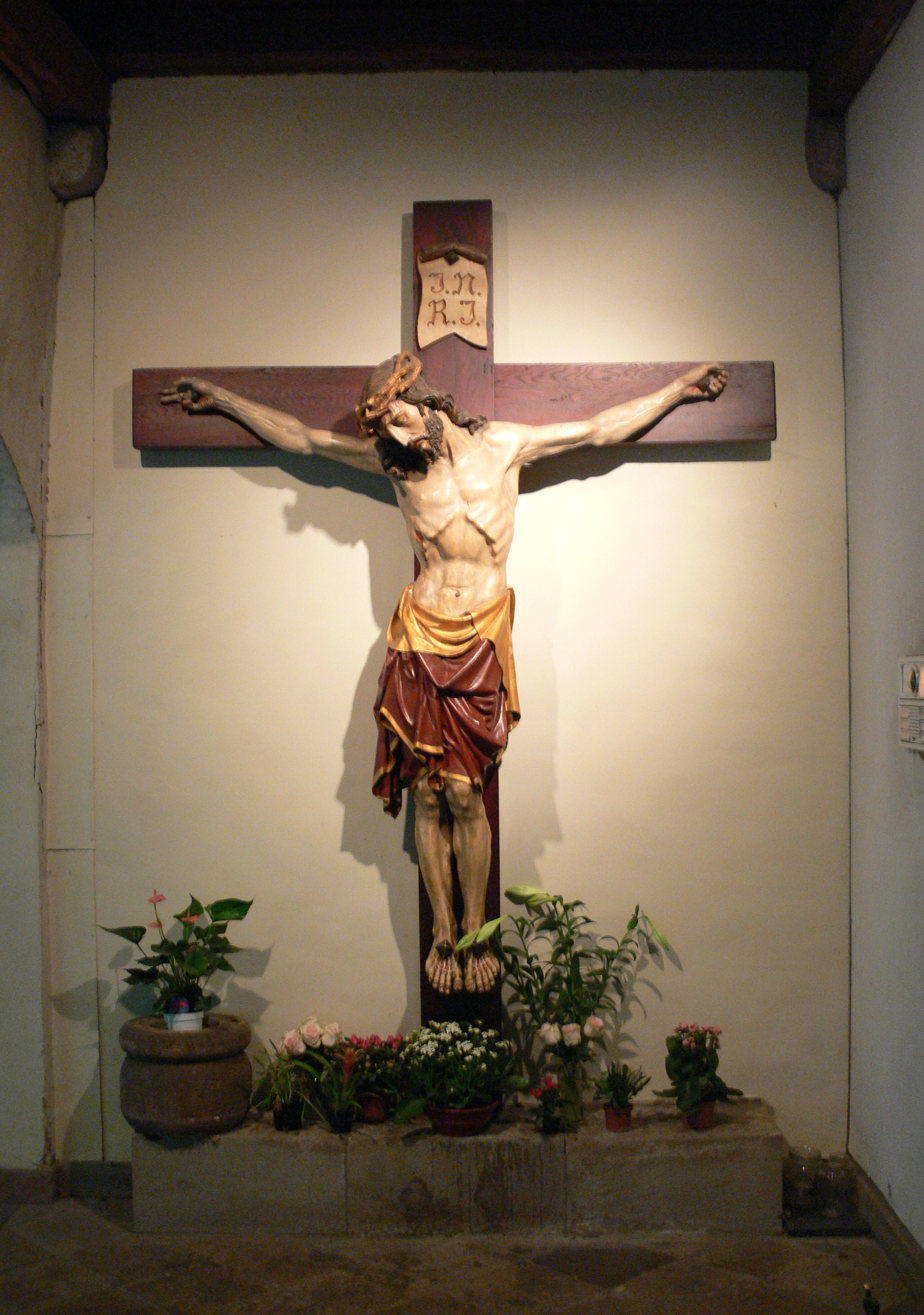
The Crucifix, cross with the corpus (Body of Christ) is an ancient symbol used within the Catholic Church, Eastern Orthodox churches, Anglican, and Lutheran churches.

Look down upon me, good and gentle Jesus,
while before Thy face I humbly kneel and,
with burning soul,
pray and beseech Thee
to fix deep in my heart lively sentiments
of faith, hope and charity;
true contrition for my sins,
and a firm purpose of amendment.

While I contemplate,
with great love and tender pity,
Thy five most precious wounds,
pondering over them within me
and calling to mind the words which David,
Thy prophet, said of Thee, my Jesus:
"They have pierced My hands and My feet,

"they have numbered all My bones."

Amen.

== Alternative version ==
Behold, O good and sweetest Jesus,
I cast myself upon my knees in Thy sight,
and with the most fervent desire of my soul
I pray and beseech Thee
to impress upon my heart
lively sentiments of faith,
hope and charity,
with true repentance for my sins
and a most firm desire of amendment.

Whilst with deep affection and grief of soul
I consider within myself
and mentally contemplate
Thy five most precious wounds,
having before my eyes that which David,
the prophet, long ago spoke concerning Thee,
"They have pierced My hands and My feet,
"they have numbered all My bones."

== See also ==
- Prayer in the Catholic Church – Roman Catholic beliefs on Christian prayer
- Catholic devotions to Jesus – Popular prayer forms of Roman Catholics
