= Litany of the Holy Name of Jesus =

Form of prayer used in Catholic Church

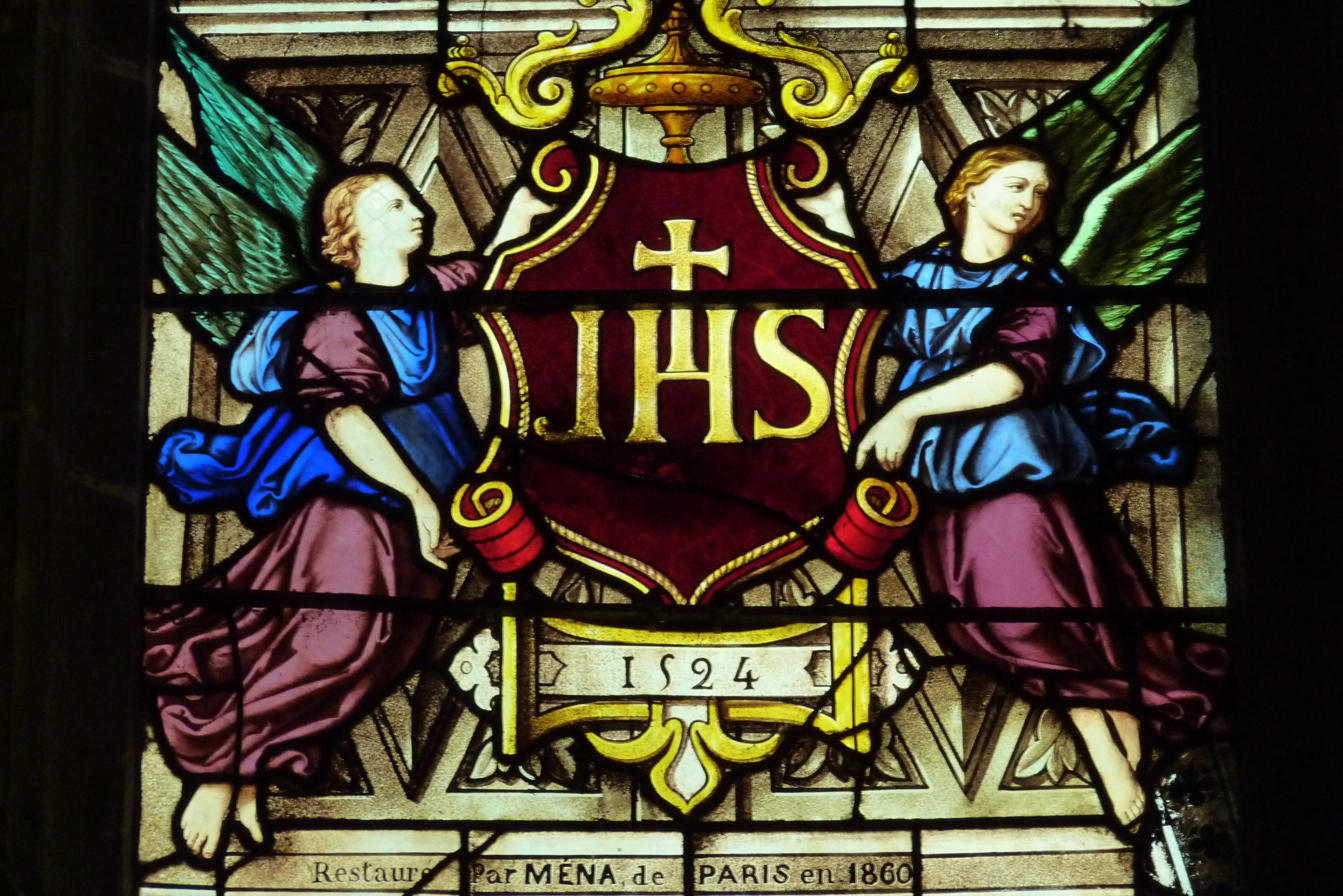
IHS monogram in Montmorency, France

The Litany of the Holy Name of Jesus is a formal prayer in the Catholic Church dedicated to the Holy Name of Jesus. It is one of six formal prayers approved by the Catholic Church for public and private use. This Litany carries a partial indulgence. It is believed that the Litany of the Holy Name of Jesus was written by SS. Bernardine of Siena and John Capistran in the 15th century.

== The Litany ==
The Litany of the Holy Name of Jesus is said as:
V. Lord, have mercy on us.
R. Christ, have mercy on us.
V. Lord, have mercy on us. Jesus, hear us.
R. Jesus, graciously hear us.
V. God the Father of Heaven
R. Have mercy on us.
V. God the Son, Redeemer of the world,
R. Have mercy on us.
V. God the Holy Spirit,
R. Have mercy on us.
V. Holy Trinity, one God,
R. Have mercy on us.

V. Jesus, Son of the living God,
R. Have mercy on us.

V. Jesus, splendor of the Father,
R. Have mercy on us.

V. Jesus, brightness of eternal light.
R. Have mercy on us.

V. Jesus, King of glory.
R. Have mercy on us.

V. Jesus, sun of justice.
R. Have mercy on us.

V. Jesus, Son of the Virgin Mary.
R. Have mercy on us.

V. Jesus, most amiable.
R. Have mercy on us.

V. Jesus, most admirable.
R. Have mercy on us.

V. Jesus, the mighty God.
R. Have mercy on us.

V. Jesus, Father of the world to come.
R. Have mercy on us.

V. Jesus, angel of great counsel.
R. Have mercy on us.

V. Jesus, most powerful.
R. Have mercy on us.

V. Jesus, most patient.
R. Have mercy on us.

V. Jesus, most obedient.
R. Have mercy on us.

V. Jesus, meek and humble of heart.
R. Have mercy on us.

V. Jesus, lover of chastity.
R. Have mercy on us.

V. Jesus, lover of us.
R. Have mercy on us.

V. Jesus, God of peace.
R. Have mercy on us.

V. Jesus, author of life.
R. Have mercy on us.

V. Jesus, example of virtues.
R. Have mercy on us.

V. Jesus, zealous lover of souls.
R. Have mercy on us.

V. Jesus, our God.
R. Have mercy on us.

V. Jesus, our refuge.
R. Have mercy on us.

V. Jesus, father of the poor.
R. Have mercy on us.

V. Jesus, treasure of the faithful.
R. Have mercy on us.

V. Jesus, good Shepherd.
R. Have mercy on us.

V. Jesus, true light.
R. Have mercy on us.

V. Jesus, eternal wisdom.
R. Have mercy on us.

V. Jesus, infinite goodness.
R. Have mercy on us.

V. Jesus, our way and our life.
R. Have mercy on us.

V. Jesus, joy of Angels.
R. Have mercy on us.

V. Jesus, King of the Patriarchs.
R. Have mercy on us.

V. Jesus, Master of the Apostles.
R. Have mercy on us.

V. Jesus, teacher of the Evangelists.
R. Have mercy on us.

V. Jesus, strength of Martyrs.
R. Have mercy on us.

V. Jesus, light of Confessors.
R. Have mercy on us.

V. Jesus, purity of Virgins.
R. Have mercy on us.

V. Jesus, crown of Saints.
R. Have mercy on us.

V. Lord, be merciful,
R. Jesus, save your people.

V. From all evil,
R. Jesus, save your people.

V. From every sin,
R. Jesus, save your people.

V. From the snares of the devil.
R. Jesus, save your people.

V. From Your anger.
R. Jesus, save your people.

V. From the spirit of infidelity.
R. Jesus, save your people.

V. From everlasting death.
R. Jesus, save your people.

V. From neglect of your Holy Spirit.
R. Jesus, save your people.

V. By the mystery of Your Incarnation.
R. Jesus, save your people.

V. By Your birth.
R. Jesus, save your people.

V. By Your childhood.
R. Jesus, save your people.

V. By Your hidden Life.c
R. Jesus, save your people.

V. By Your public ministry.
R. Jesus, save your people.

V. By Your agony and crucifixion.
R. Jesus, save your people.

V. By Your abandonment.
R. Jesus, save your people.

V. By Your grief and sorrow.
R. Jesus, save your people.

V. By Your death and burial.
R. Jesus, save your people.

V. By Your rising to new life.
R. Jesus, save your people.

V. By Your return in glory to the Father.
R. Jesus, save your people.

V. By Your gift of the most Holy Eucharist.
R. Jesus, save your people.

V. By Your joy and glory.
R. Jesus, save your people.

V. Christ, hear us.
R. Christ, hear us.

V. Lord Jesus, hear our prayer
R. Lord Jesus hear our prayer

V. Lamb of God, who take away the sins of the world,
R. have mercy on us.
V. Lamb of God, who take away the sins of the world,
R. have mercy on us.
V. Lamb of God, who take away the sins of the world,

V. Let us pray.
As we venerate the most holy Name of Jesus, mercifully grant us, Lord, that, savoring its sweetness in this life, we may be filled with everlasting joy in our heavenly homeland.
Through Christ our Lord.
R. Amen.

== Indulgence ==
The 2004 Enchiridion Indulgentiarum grants the partial indulgence to those of Christ's faithful who piously pray the Litanies.

== See also ==
- Prayer in the Catholic Church
- Litany
