= Praise FM =

Praise FM is a branding associated with the following religious radio stations:

- Praise FM (Saint Vincent and the Grenadines) 95.7 FM and 105.7 FM -- Saint Vincent and the Grenadines
- KBHL FM 103.9 -- Osakis, Minnesota (plus several satellites and repeaters)
- WVVW-LP 98.1 -- Belpre, Ohio
  - WVVP-LP 96.1 -- Marietta, Ohio (repeater of WVVW)
- KWPZ 106.5 -- Lynden, Washington
- WGUO 94.9 -- Reserve / New Orleans, Louisiana
- WJPG 88.1 -- Cape May Court House, New Jersey
- CSN International -- many of its stations use the Praise FM branding

== See also ==
- Praise (disambiguation)
