= Praise (disambiguation) =

Praise is the act of expressing approval or thanks.

Praise may also refer to:

- Elkhorn City, Kentucky, long known as Praise
- Praise (film), a 1998 Australian film
- Praise (novel), a novel by Andrew McGahan

== Music ==
- Praise music
- Praise (band), an English new-age music group
- Praise (album), a 2017 album by Emcee N.I.C.E.
- Praise with Don Moen, a 1996 album
- "Praise" (Elevation Worship song), 2023
- "Praise" (Sevendust song), 2001
- "Praise" (Marvin Gaye song), 1981
- "Praise", a song by the Pat Metheny Group from First Circle

=== Radio stations ===
- Praise FM (disambiguation), branding for several unaffiliated radio stations
- WJMO, an American radio station branded as Praise 1300
- Praise (Sirius XM), a gospel music radio station

== See also ==
- Praise and worship (disambiguation)
- Cathedral of Praise, in Manilia, Philippines
