= Outline of Bible-related topics =

Contains sacred scriptures of Judaism and Christianity

The following outline is provided as an overview of and topical guide to the Bible:

== Books ==
=== Hebrew Bible ===
The order of these books is different in the Christian Old Testament

==== Torah ====
- Book of Genesis
- Book of Exodus
- Book of Leviticus
- Book of Numbers
- Book of Deuteronomy

==== Nevi'im ====
- Book of Joshua
- Book of Judges
- Books of Samuel
- Books of Kings
- Major prophet
  - Book of Isaiah
  - Book of Jeremiah
  - Book of Ezekiel
- Twelve Minor Prophets
  - Book of Hosea
  - Book of Joel
  - Book of Amos
  - Book of Obadiah
  - Book of Jonah
  - Book of Micah
  - Book of Nahum
  - Book of Habakkuk
  - Book of Zephaniah
  - Book of Haggai
  - Book of Zechariah
  - Book of Malachi

==== Ketuvim ====
- Psalms
- Book of Proverbs
- Book of Job
- Song of Songs
- Book of Ruth
- Book of Lamentations
- Ecclesiastes
- Book of Esther
- Book of Daniel
- Book of Ezra
- Book of Nehemiah
- Books of Chronicles

All

=== Deuterocanon ===
- Book of Tobit
- Book of Judith
- Additions to Esther (Vulgate Esther 10:4–16:24)
- Book of Wisdom (also called the Wisdom of Solomon)
- Sirach (also called Ecclesiasticus)
- Book of Baruch, including the Letter of Jeremiah (Additions to Jeremiah in the Septuagint)
- Additions to Daniel:
  - Prayer of Azariah and Song of the Three Holy Children (Vulgate Daniel 3:24–90)
  - Susanna (Vulgate Daniel 13, Septuagint prologue)
  - Bel and the Dragon (Vulgate Daniel 14, Septuagint epilogue)
- 1 Maccabees
- 2 Maccabees

=== New Testament ===
==== Gospel ====
- Gospel of Matthew
- Gospel of Mark
- Gospel of Luke
- Gospel of John

==== Acts of the Apostles ====
- Acts of the Apostles

==== Epistles ====
===== Pauline epistles =====
- Epistle to the Romans
- First Epistle to the Corinthians
- Second Epistle to the Corinthians
- Epistle to the Galatians
- Epistle to the Ephesians
- Epistle to the Philippians
- Epistle to the Colossians
- First Epistle to the Thessalonians
- Second Epistle to the Thessalonians
- Epistle to Philemon

===== Pastoral epistles =====
- First Epistle to Timothy
- Second Epistle to Timothy
- Epistle to Titus

===== General epistles =====
- Epistle to the Hebrews
- Epistle of James
- First Epistle of Peter
- Second Epistle of Peter
- First Epistle of John
- Second Epistle of John
- Third Epistle of John
- Epistle of Jude

==== Revelation ====
- Book of Revelation

== Versions ==
- Bible translations
  - Bible translations into English
    - List of English Bible translations
  - Bible translations into Coptic
- Gothic Bible
- King James Bible
- Luther Bible
- Masoretic Text
- Novum Testamentum Graece
- Septuagint
- Vetus Latina
- Vulgate

== Languages ==
- Biblical Aramaic
- Biblical Hebrew
- Koine Greek

== History ==
=== Development ===
- Biblical canon
- Development of the Hebrew Bible canon
- Development of the Old Testament canon
- Development of the New Testament canon

=== Authorship ===
- Authorship of the Bible
- Mosaic authorship
- Authorship of the Pauline epistles
- Authorship of the Johannine works
- Authorship of the Petrine epistles

== Ethics ==
- Ethics in the Bible
  - Alcohol in the Bible
  - The Bible and humor
  - The Bible and violence
    - Capital punishment in the Bible
    - Rape in the Hebrew Bible
    - Warfare in the Hebrew Bible
  - The Bible and slavery
  - Sex in the Hebrew Bible
    - The Bible and homosexuality
    - Incest in the Bible
    - Rape in the Hebrew Bible
  - Women in the Bible

== General concepts ==
=== Interpretation ===
- Biblical hermeneutics
- Pesher
- Midrash
- Pardes
- Allegorical interpretation
- Biblical literalism
- Bible prophecy

=== Studies ===
- Biblical studies
- Dating the Bible
- The Bible and history
- Biblical archaeology
  - Biblical archaeology school
- Biblical criticism
  - Higher criticism
  - Textual criticism
  - Canonical criticism
- Categories of New Testament manuscripts
- Documentary hypothesis
- Internal consistency of the Bible
- List of biblical figures identified in extra-biblical sources
- List of biblical places
- List of biblical names
- Synoptic Gospels

== Content ==
- Category:Bible content
  - Category:New Testament content
  - Category:Bible chapters
  - Category:Biblical people
  - Category:Biblical phrases
  - Category:Biblical topics
  - Category:Bible verses

== Works based on the Bible ==
- Category:Works based on the Bible
  - Category:Biblical art
  - Category:Biblical comics
  - Category:Biblical poetry
  - Category:Films based on the Bible
  - Category:Games based on the Bible
  - Category:Music based on the Bible
  - Category:Musicals based on the Bible
  - Category:Novels based on the Bible
  - Category:Operas based on the Bible
  - Category:Plays based on the Bible
  - Category:Television shows based on the Bible
  - Category:Video games based on the Bible

== The Bible in Mormonism ==
- Bible Dictionary (LDS Church)
- Book of Mormon and the King James Bible
- Joseph Smith Translation of the Bible
- LDS edition of the Bible
- Standard works

== See also ==
- Biblical and Quranic narratives
- List of Bible verses not included in modern translations
- List of biblical commentaries
- List of biblical figures identified in extra-biblical sources
- List of biblical place names in North America
- List of burial places of biblical figures
- List of Chinese Bible translations
- List of English Bible translations
- List of Hebrew Bible events
- List of Hebrew Bible manuscripts
- List of Jewish biblical figures
- List of languages by year of first Bible translation
- List of major biblical figures
- List of minor biblical figures
- List of minor biblical places
- List of minor biblical tribes
- List of Moody Bible Institute people
- List of names for the biblical nameless
- List of people in both the Bible and the Quran
- Outline of the Book of Mormon
