= Worship Music =

Worship Music may refer to:

- Contemporary worship music, a genre of Christian music used in contemporary worship
- Worship Music (album), a 2011 album by Anthrax
