= Praise =

Expression of positive recognition, reassurance or admiration

Praise as a form of social interaction expresses recognition, reassurance or admiration.

Praise is expressed verbally as well as by body language (facial expression and gestures).

Verbal praise consists of a positive evaluations of another's attributes or actions, where the evaluator presumes the validity of the standards on which the evaluation is based.

As a form of social manipulation, praise becomes a form of reward and furthers behavioral reinforcement by conditioning. The influence of praise on an individual can depend on many factors, including the context, the meanings the praise may convey, and the characteristics and interpretations of the recipient. While praise may share some predictive relationships (both positive and negative) with tangible (material) rewards, praise tends to be less salient and expected, conveys more information about competence, and is typically given more immediately after the desired behavior.

Praise is distinct from acknowledgement or feedback (more neutral forms of recognition) and from encouragement (expressedly future-oriented).

Praise is given across social hierarchy, and both within the ingroup and towards an outgroup; it is an important aspect in the regulation of social hierarchy and the maintenance of group cohesion, influencing the potential for political action and social upheaval. When given by a dominant individual it takes the form of recognition and reassurance; when given by a submissive to a dominant individual it takes the form of deference, admiration or exultation, or deification. Praise of gods may form part of religious rites and practices (see for example prayer of praise and praise and worship). Praise of self may be contrasted with modesty in self-description.

== As behavioral reinforcement ==
The concept of praise as a means of behavioral reinforcement is rooted in B.F. Skinner's model of operant conditioning. Through this lens, praise has been viewed as a means of positive reinforcement, wherein an observed behavior is made more likely to occur by contingently praising said behavior. Hundreds of studies have demonstrated the effectiveness of praise in promoting positive behaviors, notably in the study of teacher and parent use of praise on child in promoting improved behavior and academic performance, but also in the study of work performance. Praise has also been demonstrated to reinforce positive behaviors in non-praised adjacent individuals (such as a classmate of the praise recipient) through vicarious reinforcement. Praise may be more or less effective in changing behavior depending on its form, content and delivery. In order for praise to effect positive behavior change, it must be contingent on the positive behavior (i.e., only administered after the targeted behavior is enacted), must specify the particulars of the behavior that is to be reinforced, and must be delivered sincerely and credibly.

Acknowledging the effect of praise as a positive reinforcement strategy, numerous behavioral and cognitive behavioral interventions have incorporated the use of praise in their protocols. The strategic use of praise is recognized as an evidence-based practice in both classroom management and parenting training interventions, though praise is often subsumed in intervention research into a larger category of positive reinforcement, which includes strategies such as strategic attention and behavioral rewards.

== Effects beyond behavior change ==
Although the majority of early research on the influences of praise focused on behavior implications, more recent investigations have highlighted important implications in other domains. Praise may have cognitive influences on an individual, by attracting attention to the self, or by conveying information about the values and expectations of the praiser to the recipient. Effective praise (i.e., praise that is welcomed or accepted by the recipient) may also have positive emotional effects by generating a positive affective state (e.g., happiness, joy, pride). Praise is also thought to convey that one has surpassed a noteworthy evaluative standard, and if the recipient of the praise is likely to experience a sense of pleasure stemming from a positive self-perception. Contrastingly, praise may create negative emotional consequences if it appears disingenuous or manipulative.

Alternative views of the effects of praise on motivation exist. In one camp, praise is thought to decrease intrinsic motivation by increasing the presence of external control. However, praise has also been argued to define standards and expectations, which in turn may motivate an individual to exert effort to meet those standards. Lastly, praise may serve to influence interpersonal relations. For example, strong pressures to reciprocate praise have been found. It is thought that the mutual praise may serve to increase attraction and strengthen the interpersonal relationship, and this process may underlie the use of praise in ingratiation.

== Dimensions ==
=== Person versus process ===
Over the past several decades, researchers have distinguished between praise for a person's general abilities and qualities (e.g., "You're such a good drawer.") and for the process of performance (e.g., "You are working so hard at that drawing."). This distinction between person versus process praise is sometimes referred to as ability versus effort praise, though ability and effort statements can be seen as subcategories of person and process statements, respectively.

Traditionally, person(trait)-oriented praise was thought to instill a child's belief that they have the capacity to succeed, and thus help motivate them to learn. However, social-cognitive theorists have more recently suggested that person-oriented (as opposed to process-oriented) praise may have detrimental impacts on a child's self-perceptions, motivation and learning. For example, praising children for their personal attributes, rather than specifics about their performance, may teach them to make inferences about their global worth, and may thus undermine their intrinsic motivation. In a study of person- versus process-oriented praise, Kamins and Dweck found that children who received person-oriented praise displayed more "helpless" responses following a failure including self-blame, than those in the process condition. Henderlong and Lepper suggest that person-oriented praise may function like tangible rewards, in that they produce desired outcomes in the short-run, but may undermine intrinsic motivation and subsequent perseverance. However, Skipper & Douglas found that although person- versus process-oriented praise (and an objective feedback control group) predicted more negative responses to the first failure, all three groups demonstrated similarly negative responses to the second failure. Thus, the long-term negative consequences of person-oriented praise are still unclear.

Person and process (or performance) praise may also foster different attributional styles such that person-oriented praise may lead one to attribute success and failure to stable ability, which in turn may foster helplessness reactions in the face of setbacks. Contrastingly, process praise may foster attributions regarding effort or strategy, such that children attribute their success (or failure) to these variables, rather than their stable trait or ability. This attributional style can foster more adaptive reactions to both success and failure. In support of this notion, Muller and Dweck experimentally found praise for child intelligence to be more detrimental to 5th graders' achievement motivation than praise for effort. Following a failure, the person-praised students displayed less task persistence, task enjoyment, and displayed worse task performance than those praised for effort. These findings are in line with personal theories of achievement striving, in which in the face of failure, performance tends to improve when individuals make attributions to a lack of effort, but worsen when they attribute their failure to a lack of ability.

In the studies mentioned above, person-oriented praise was found to be less beneficial than process-oriented praise, but this is not always found to be the case. Particularly, effort-oriented praise may be detrimental when given during tasks that are exceptionally easy. This may be especially apparent for older children as they see effort and ability to be inversely related and thus an overemphasis on effort may suggest a lack of ability.

=== Controlling versus informational ===
Proponents of cognitive evaluation theory (Deci & Ryan) have focused on two aspects of praise thought to influence a child's self-determination: information and control. Taking this perspective, the informational aspect of praise is thought to promote a perceived internal locus of control (and thus greater self-determination) while the controlling aspects promote a perceived external locus of control and thus extrinsic compliance or defiance. Thus, Deci & Ryan suggest that the effect of praise is moderated by the salience of informational versus controlling aspects of praise.

The theory that informational praise enhances self-determination over controlling praise has been supported by several empirical studies. In a metanalysis including five studies distinguishing informational from controlling praise, Deci, Koestner & Ryan found that informational-based praise related to greater intrinsic motivation (as measured by free-choice behavior and self-reported interest) while controlling praise was associated with less intrinsic motivation. For example, Pittman and colleagues found that adults demonstrated more free-choice engagement with a task after receiving informational ("e.g., "Compared to most of my subjects, you're doing really well."), rather than controlling (e.g., "I haven't been able to use most of the data I've gotten so far, but you're doing really well, and if you keep it up I'll be able to use yours.") praise.

Several complexities of informational versus controlling praise have been acknowledged. First, though the differences between information and controlling praise have been well-established, it is difficult to determine whether the net effects of these forms of praise will be positive, negative or neutral compared to a control condition. In addition, it is often difficult to determine the extent to which informational, controlling, or both, which may muddy interpretations of results.

=== Social-comparison versus mastery ===
Social comparison is a psychological process that is widely prevalent, particularly so in educational settings. In Festinger's social comparison theory, he noted that people engage in social comparison as a means to reduce ambiguity and accurately evaluate their own qualities and abilities. However, controversy exists over whether providing children with social-comparison praise has beneficial impact on their motivation and performance. Some studies have demonstrated that students who received social-comparison praise (e.g., "you're doing better than most students" or "you're performance is amongst the best we've had") demonstrated greater motivation compared to no-praise or other control groups. Sarafino, Russo, Barker, Consentino and Titus found that students who received social-comparison voluntarily engaged in the task more so than those who received feedback that they performed similar to others. Though these studies demonstrate the possible positive influence of social-comparison praise, they have been criticized for inadequate control groups. For example, a control group given feedback that they are average may be seen as negative, rather than neutral. In addition, most social-comparison studies do not examine motivation or behavior following a subsequent unsuccessful task.

Beyond methodology, the primary criticism to social-comparison praise is that it teaches children to evaluate themselves on the basis of the performance of others, and may therefore lead to maladaptive coping in situations in which one is outperformed by others individuals. Social-comparison praise has been hypothesized to decrease intrinsic motivation for the praised children because they may then view their behaviors as externally controlled. Contrastingly, it is suggested that praise that focused on a child's competence (mastery) rather than social comparison may be important for fostering motivation. This area is relatively understudied, though some interesting findings have emerged. In a study of adults, Koestner, Zuckerman, and Olsson found that gender moderated the influence of social-comparison and mastery praise, where women were more intrinsically motivated following mastery praise, while men were more motivated following social-comparison praise. In a study of children, Henderlong Corpus, Ogle & Love-Geiger found that social-comparison praise lead to decreased motivation following ambiguous feedback for all children, and also decreased motivation following positive feedback for girls only. Thus, mastery praise may be more conducive than social-comparison to fostering intrinsic motivation, particularly for females, though more research is needed to tease apart these relationships.

== Beauty ==
Beauty is worth praise, "if the praise is directed at the beauty itself without giving credit for having it to the person whose beauty it happens to be.".

Sir Kenneth Dover provides us with clarity over the question of beauty and praise, with his voice on our two main senses giving us the feeling to praise:

The word [praise], when applied to a person, means 'beautiful', 'pretty', 'handsome', 'attractive', and its antonym is aischros, 'ugly'. The words are also applied to objects, sights and sounds and whatever can be heard about and thought about, such as an institution, an achievement or failure, or a virtuous or vicious action; kalos expresses a favourable reaction ('admirable', 'creditable', 'honourable') and aischros an unfavour-able reaction ('disgraceful', 'repulsive', 'contemptible').

Dover states there is a distinction of aesthetic and the moral senses of the term; "It must be emphasized that the Greeks did not call a person 'beautiful' by virtue of that person's morals, intelligence, ability or temperament, but solely by virtue of shape, colour, texture and movement".

== Factors that affect influence ==
=== Age ===
The function of praise on child performance and motivation may likely vary as a function of age. Few studies have directly examined developmental differences in praise, though some evidence has been found. Henderlong Corpus & Lepper found person praise (as opposed to process praise) to negatively influence motivation for older girls (4th/5th grade), while for preschool-age children, there were no differences in the effects of process, person and product praise, though all three forms of praise were associated with increased motivation as compared to neutral feedback. In a different study, Henderlong found that for older children, process praise enhanced post-failure motivation more so than person praise, and person praise decreased motivation as compared to neutral feedback. Contrastingly, for preschool-age children process praise enhanced post-failure motivation more than person praise, but both were better than neutral feedback. Some posit that younger children do not experience the negative effects of certain types of praise because they do not yet make causal attributions in complex ways, and they are more literal in their interpretations of adult speech.

=== Gender ===
The function of praise on child behavior and motivation has also found to vary as a function of child gender. Some researchers have shown that females are more susceptible to the negative effects of certain types of praise (person-oriented praise, praise that limits autonomy). For example, Koestner, Zuckerman & Koestner found that girls were more negatively influenced by praise that diminished perceived autonomy. Henderlong Corpus and Lepper found that process praise was more beneficial to motivation than person praise, but only for girls. This difference was found for older children, but not preschool-aged children.

Others have found young girls to be more negatively influenced by the evaluations of adults more generally. Some have posited that this gender difference is due to girls more often attributing failure to lack of ability rather than a lack of motivation or effort. Gender differences may be attributable to normative socialization practices, in which people generally emphasize dependence and interpersonal relationships for girls, but achievement and independence for boys.

=== Culture ===
Culture has been referred to as a "blind spot" in the praise literature. Yet, there is reason to believe that cultural differences in the effects of praise exist. Much of the discussion on culture and praise has focused on differences between independent and interdependent cultures (e.g.). Stated briefly, independent cultures, common in Western cultures, generally value and seek to promote individualism and autonomy, while interdependent cultures promote fundamental connectedness and harmony in interpersonal relationships.

Looking through this cultural lens, clear differences in the use and impact of praise can be found. In comparison to the United States, praise is rarely used in China and Japan (e.g.), as praise may be thought to be harmful to a child's character. In interdependent cultures, individuals are generally motivated by self-improvement. This cultural difference has also been found experimentally. Heine, Lehman, Markus & Katayama found that Canadian students persisted longer after positive than negative performance feedback, while the opposite was true for Japanese students. Some posit that individuals from independent and interdependent cultures largely express different models of praise (independence-supportive and interdependence-supportive praise.

== See also ==
- Gratitude
- Praise name
- Loa (Spanish play) – Short theatrical piece to introduce Spanish Golden Age plays
- Praise and worship (disambiguation)
