= You are Christ =

Prayer to Jesus

You are Christ is a prayer to Jesus attributed to Augustine of Hippo, in the 4th or 5th century. The title of the prayer is reminiscent of the statement of Saint Peter to Jesus: "You are the Christ" (Matthew 16:16; Mark 8:29).

The prayer has three parts. The first part is a list of titles and salutations to Jesus. The second part involves a set of conversational questions. The third part is a list of petitions to Jesus.

== Words of the prayer ==
You are Christ, my Holy Father, my Tender God, my Great King, my Good Shepherd, my Only Master, my Best Helper, my Most Beautiful and my Beloved, my Living Bread, my Priest Forever, my Leader to my Country, my True Light, my Holy Sweetness, my Straight Way, my Excellent Wisdom, my Pure Simplicity, my Peaceful Harmony, my Entire Protection, my Good Portion, my Everlasting Salvation.

Christ Jesus, Sweet Lord, why have I ever loved, why in my whole life have I ever desired anything except You, Jesus my God? Where was I when I was not in spirit with You? Now, from this time forth, do you, all my desires, grow hot, and flow out upon the Lord Jesus: run... you have been tardy until now; hasten where you are going; seek Whom you are seeking. O, Jesus may he who loves You not be an anathema; may he who loves You not be filled with bitterness.

O, Sweet Jesus, may every good feeling that is fitted for Your praise, love You, delight in You, adore You! God of my heart, and my Portion, Christ Jesus, may my heart faint away in spirit, and may You be my Life within me! May the live coal of Your Love grow hot within my spirit and break forth into a perfect fire; may it burn incessantly on the altar of my heart; may it glow in my innermost being; may it blaze in hidden recesses of my soul; and in the days of my consummation may I be found consummated with You!

Amen.
