= Prayer in the Catholic Church =

Roman Catholic beliefs on Christian prayer

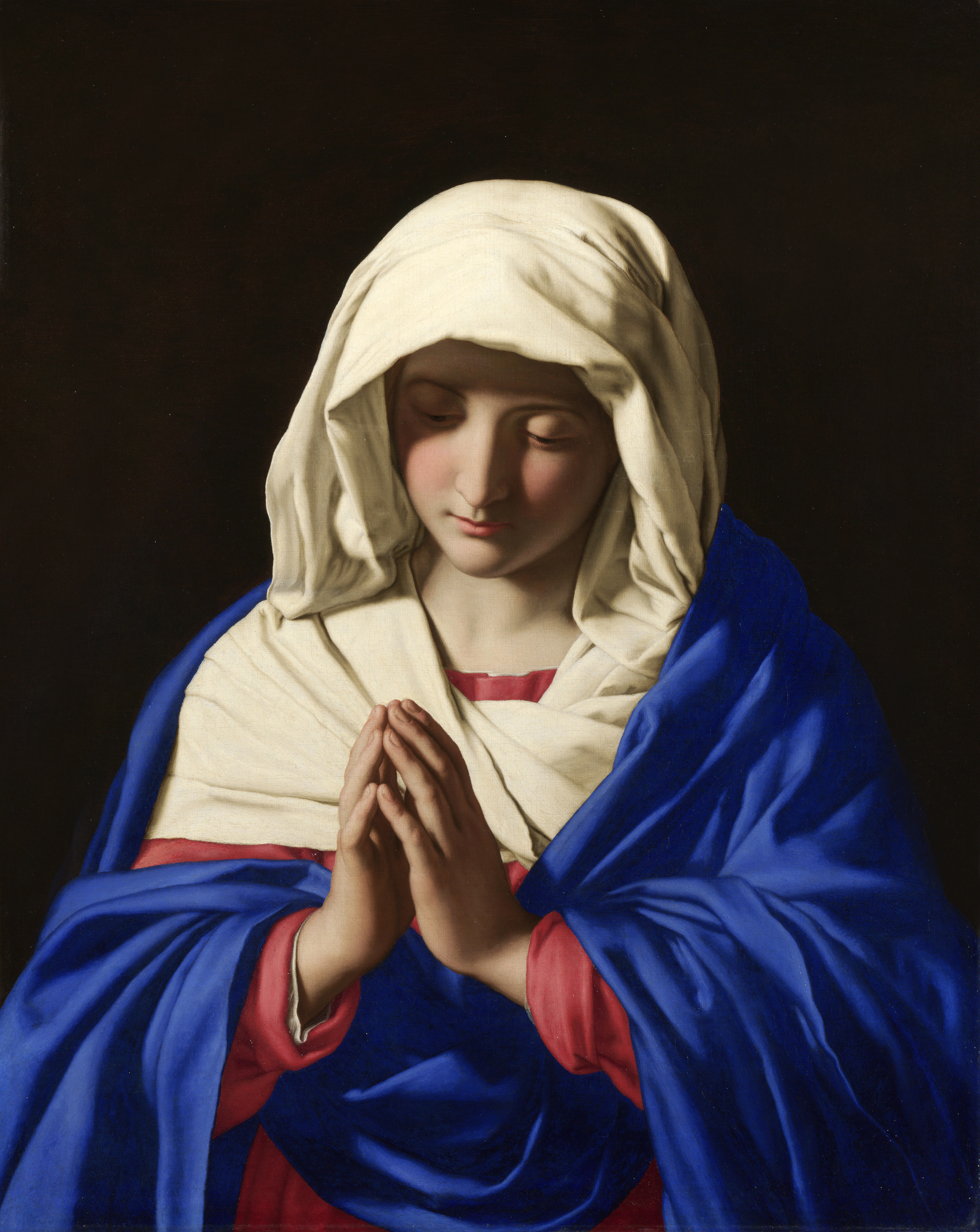
The Virgin in Prayer portrays Mary praying, by Sassoferrato, 17th century

Prayer in the Catholic Church is officially spoken of as "the raising of one's mind and heart to God or the requesting of good things from God". It is an act of the moral virtue of religion, which Catholic theologians identify as a part of the cardinal virtue of justice.

Prayer may be expressed vocally or mentally. Vocal prayer may be spoken or sung. Mental prayer can be either meditation or contemplation. The basic forms of prayer are adoration, contrition, thanksgiving, and supplication, sometimes abbreviated as A.C.T.S.

The Liturgy of the Hours of the Catholic Church is recited daily at fixed prayer times by the members of the consecrated life, the clergy and devout believers.

== Daily prayer ==
In the Catholic Church, the laity are encouraged to join the prayer of the canonical hours. Clergy and members of the consecrated life are obligated to pray the daily office. Sources commonly used to pray the Liturgy of the Hours include the full four volume set of The Liturgy of the Hours, the one volume Christian Prayer book, and various apps on mobile devices.

== Teachings on prayer ==
Roman Catholic teachings on the subject of prayer are contained in the Catechism where, quoting John of Damascus, prayer is defined as "the raising of one's mind and heart to God or the requesting of good things from God". Thérèse of Lisieux describes prayer as "… a surge of the heart; it is a simple look turned toward heaven, it is a cry of recognition and of love, embracing both trial and joy."

The Second Vatican Council's Constitution on the Sacred Liturgy commends three forms of prayer:

- participation in the communal liturgy of the church
- the times when a person also "enter[s] into his chamber to pray to the Father, in secret or private prayer, (cf. Matthew 6:6), and
- prayer "without ceasing" (cf. 1 Thessalonians 5:17).

By prayer one acknowledges God's power and goodness, and one's own neediness and dependence. It is therefore an act of the virtue of religion implying the deepest reverence for God and habituating a person to look to him for everything. Prayer presupposes faith in God and hope in his goodness. By both, God, to whom one prays, moves the individual to prayer.

== Expressions of prayer ==
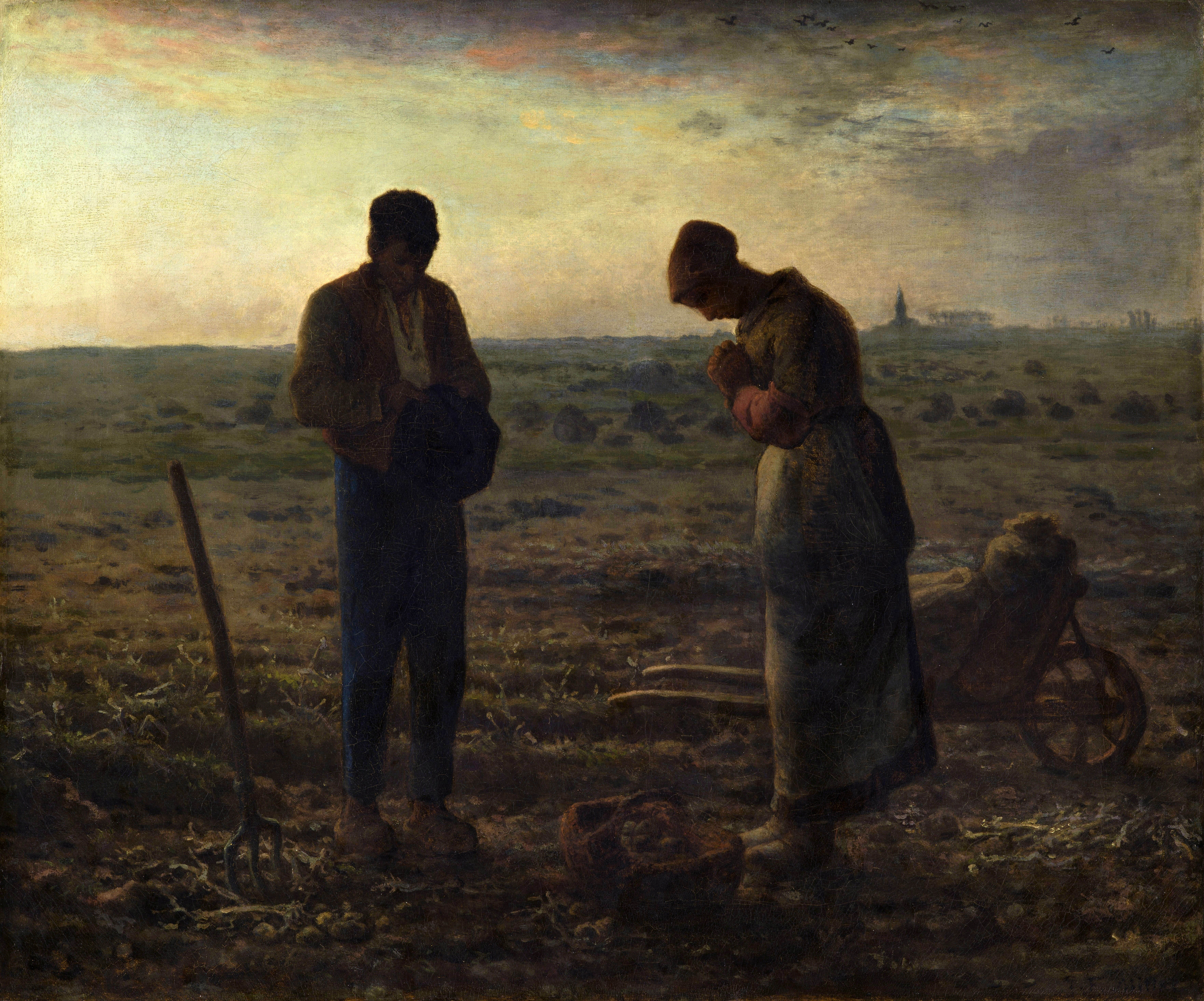
The Angelus by Jean-François Millet, 1857-1859

Prayer can be separated into vocal and mental forms.

=== Vocal prayer ===
Vocal prayer is that which is made by using some approved form of words, read, sung or recited; such as the sign of the cross, the Liturgy of the Hours (Divine Office), the Angelus, grace before and after meals, etc. Mental prayer is that which is made without employing either words or formulas of any kind. Catholics are exhorted to beware of underrating the usefulness or necessity of vocal prayer. Common vocal prayers include the Lord's Prayer (Our Father, Pater Noster), the Hail Mary (Ave Maria, Angelical salutation), the Glory Be (Gloria Patri, Minor Doxology), and the Apostles' Creed (Symbolum Apostolorum).

Catholics consider vocal prayer an essential element of the Christian life. Vocal prayer can be as simple and uplifting as "Thank you, God, for this beautiful morning", or as formal as a Mass celebrating a very special occasion.

When two or more people gather together to pray, their prayer is called communal prayer. Examples of communal prayer are the Rosary, devotional prayers including novenas and litanies, classroom prayers, and, most importantly, the Holy Mass.

==== Chanted prayer ====
Saint Ambrose introduced antiphonal singing of the psalms in Milan "after the manner of the East".

=== Mental prayer ===
Mental prayer was defined by John A. Hardon in his Modern Catholic Dictionary as a form of prayer in which the sentiments expressed are one's own and not those of another person. Mental prayer is a form of prayer whereby one loves God through dialogue with him, meditating on his words, and contemplating him. It is a time of silence focused on God and one's relationship with him. It is distinguished from vocal prayers which use set prayers, although mental prayer can proceed by using vocal prayers in order to improve dialogue with God. Mental prayer can be divided into meditation, or active mental prayer; and contemplation, passive mental prayer.

==== Meditation ====
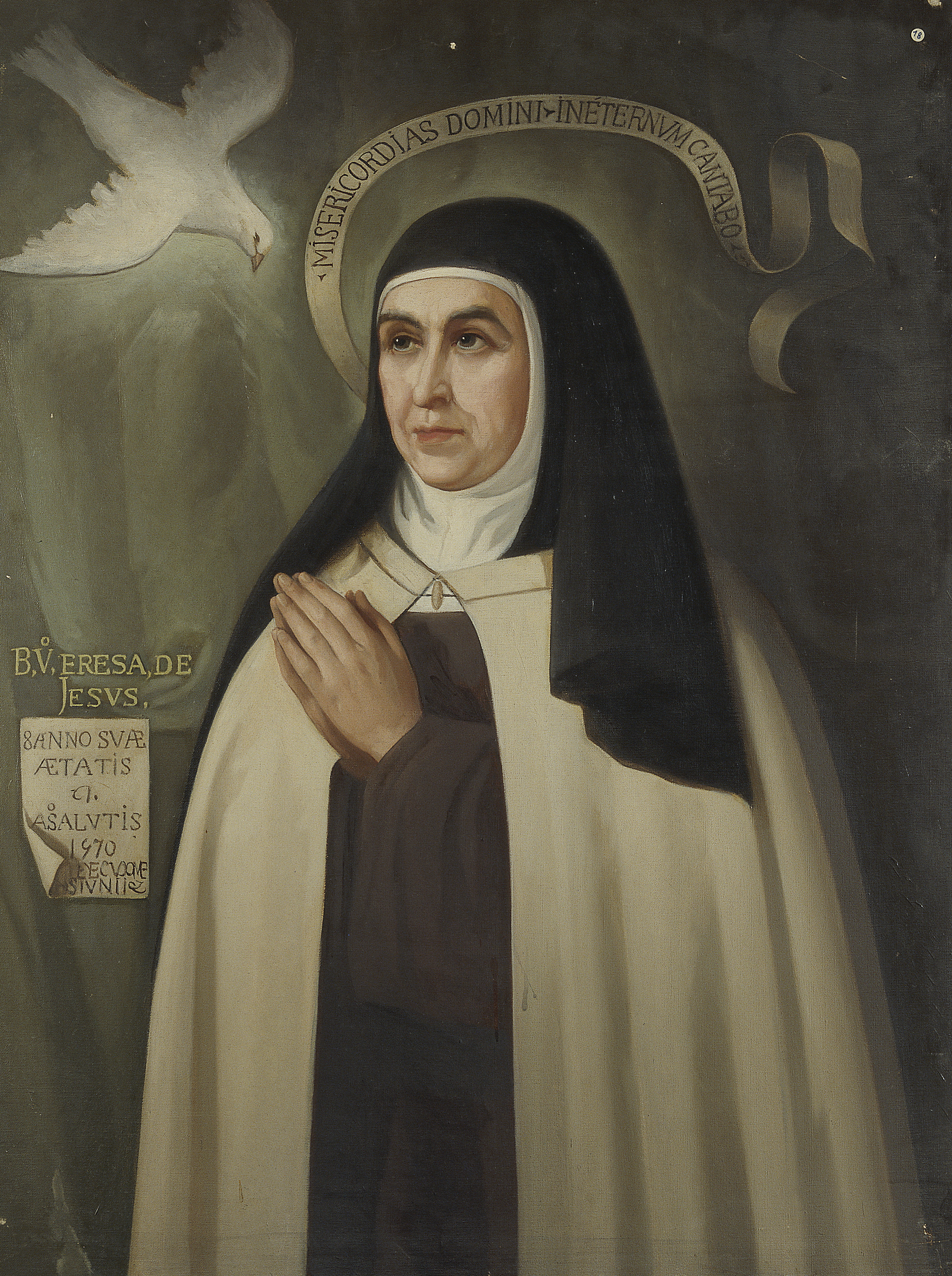
Teresa of Avila

Meditation is a form of reflective prayer which engages thought, imagination, emotion, and desire. There are as many methods of meditation as there are spiritual masters. Ordinary or active mental prayer consists of two operations; one belongs to the thinking faculty which applies the imagination, memory, and understanding to consider some truth or mystery. The other operation is dependent on the will and compels one to love, desire, and ask for the good proposed by the mind, and make resolutions to arrive at it. According to Teresa of Ávila, the soul in this stage is like a gardener, who, with much labour, draws the water up from the depths of the well to water his plants and flowers.

==== Contemplation ====
Contemplative prayer is a silent attentiveness which looks at God by contemplating and adoring his attributes. Teresa describes contemplative prayer [oración mental] as "...nothing else than a close sharing between friends; it means taking time frequently to be alone with him who we know loves us". In this inner prayer we can still meditate, but our attention is fixed on the Lord himself. Contemplation, like all prayer, is a pure gift, and not anything one can achieve.

== Forms of prayer ==
The tradition of the Catholic Church highlights four basic elements of Christian prayer: (1) Prayer of Adoration/Blessing, (2) Prayer of Contrition/Repentance, (3) Prayer of Thanksgiving/Gratitude, and (4) Prayer of Supplication/Petition/Intercession. These elements may be easily remembered using the acronym ACTS: Adoration, Contrition, Thanksgiving, Supplication.

=== Adoration and blessing ===
Adoration is the first attitude of man acknowledging that he is a creature before God. Praise is the form of prayer which recognizes most immediately that God is God. It lauds God for his own sake and gives him glory, quite beyond what he does, but simply because he is.

In its widest applications the word "blessing" has a variety of meanings in sacred writings. It can be taken in a sense that is synonymous with praise; thus the Psalmist, "I will bless the Lord at all times; praise shall be always in my mouth." The prayer of blessing expresses praise and honour to God and is man's response to God's gifts.

=== Contrition and repentance ===
Repentance is sincere regret or remorse for sin, resolution to avoid sin in the future, and conversion of the heart toward God, with hope in his mercy and trust in the help of his grace. Contrition, similarly, is a sorrow of the soul and detestation for the sin committed, together with the resolution not to sin again. The Catholic Church further provides the sacrament of penance, by which members may receive forgiveness of their sins by Jesus Christ through his ordained priests, according to the words of Jesus Christ to his apostles, "Whose sins you shall forgive, they are forgiven them; and whose sins you shall retain, they are retained."

=== Thanksgiving and gratitude ===
Thankfulness is thanking God for what he has given and done.

=== Supplication, petition, or intercession ===
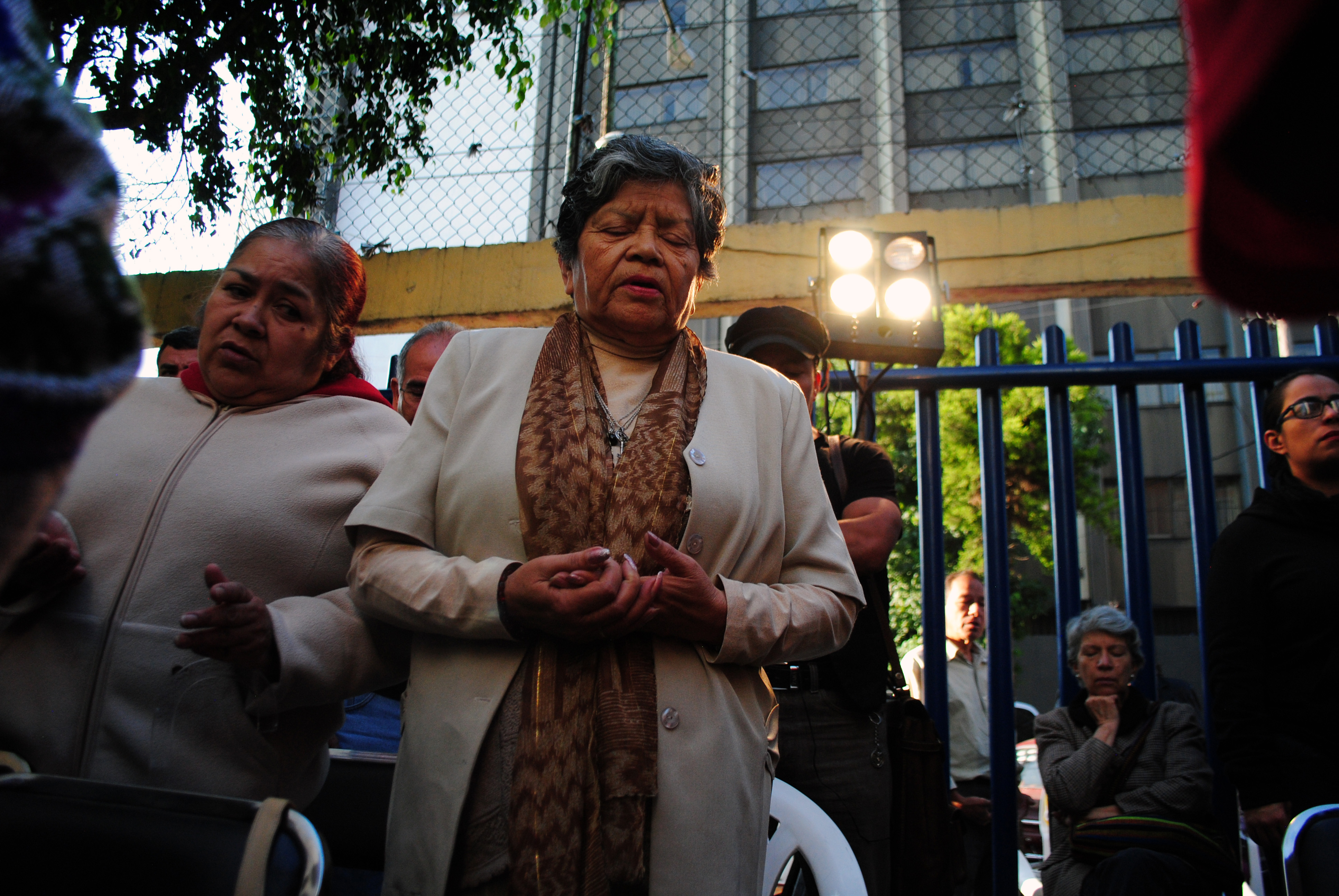
Catholics reciting the Lord's Prayer in Mexico

A prayer of petition is a request to God that asks him to fulfill a need. By prayer of petition, Catholics acknowledge their dependence on God. This expression is not intended to instruct or direct God what to do, but to appeal to his goodness for the things we need; and the appeal is necessary, not because he is ignorant of one's needs or sentiments, but to give definite form to one's desires, to concentrate one's whole attention on what is being recommended to him, to help one appreciate our close personal relationship with him. The expression need not be external or vocal; internal or mental is sufficient. The prayer of petition is at its heart an act of faith in that the one praying must believe first, in the existence of God; and second, that God is both willing and able to grant the petition. The Catechism states that asking forgiveness, coupled with trusting humility, should be the first movement of a prayer of petition (see [#Contrition and repentance|Contrition and repentance] above). Jesus said to bring our every need to God in his name and assures that "whatever you ask the Father in my name he will give you" (John 16:23). Through petition one can ask for God's help with every need no matter how great or small. According to the Catechism, Christ is glorified by what we ask the Father in his name.

Intercession is a prayer of petition which leads one to pray as Jesus did. He is the one Great Intercessor with the Father on behalf of all people, especially sinners. As the Body of Christ, we are also called to intercede for each other and encouraged to ask intercessory prayers of those members of the Body of Christ who have gone before us and are in Heaven as well as of the holy angels. Mary, the Mother of Christ and our Mother is especially looked to for intercessory prayers on our behalf because of her closeness with her Son, our Savior Jesus Christ, and our turning to her, to the saints, to the holy angels, and to each other, does not diminish, but enhances, the understanding that Christ remains above all the Head of the Body of Christ and the One, Great Intercessor before Our Father in Heaven.

== Psalms ==
The Psalms have always been an important part of Catholic liturgy. From earliest times until today, Christians view the Old Testament as prefiguring Christ. The evangelists quote the words of the psalms as being on the lips of Jesus during his passion. Along these lines, ancient monks and nuns in the Egyptian desert heard Jesus' voice in all the psalms. They believed the psalms were written by King David, but they also believed that the pre-existent Christ inspired David to do the writing (Ps 110:1). For this reason, they prayed the whole Psalter daily. This tradition has grown and changed, but it still continues, faithful to the ancient practice. In Christian monasteries and many religious houses throughout the world, vowed men and women gather three to seven times daily to pray the psalms.

The Liturgy of the Hours is centered on chanting or recitation of the Psalms. Early Catholics employed the Psalms widely in their individual prayers also. Until the end of the Middle Ages it was not unknown for the laity to join in the singing of the Little Office of Our Lady, which was a shortened version of the Liturgy of the Hours providing a fixed daily cycle of twenty-five psalms to be recited.

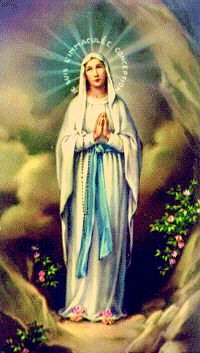
Our Lady of Lourdes with Rosary beads

== Devotions ==
Devotions are prayers or pious exercises used to demonstrate reverence for a particular aspect of God or the person of Jesus, or for a particular saint. Catholic devotions have various forms, ranging from formalized prayers such as novenas to activities which do not involve any prayers, such as Eucharistic adoration, the veneration of the saints, and even horticultural practices such as maintaining a Mary garden. Common examples of Catholic devotions include the Rosary, the Devotion to the Sacred Heart of Jesus, the Holy Face of Jesus, the Immaculate Heart of Mary, and the veneration of various saints, etc. The Congregation for Divine Worship at the Vatican publishes a Directory of devotions and pious practices. The Rosary is a devotion for the meditation of the mysteries of joy, of sorrow and the glory of Jesus and Mary. Lucia dos Santos said: "The Most Holy Virgin in these last times in which we live has given a new efficacy to the recitation of the Rosary to such an extent that there is no problem, no matter how difficult it is, whether temporal or above all spiritual, in the personal life of each one of us, of our families...that cannot be solved by the Rosary. There is no problem, I tell you, no matter how difficult it is, that we cannot resolve by the prayer of the Holy Rosary." In his 2002 encyclical Rosarium Virginis Mariae, Pope John Paul II emphasized that the final goal of Christian life is to be transformed, or "transfigured", into Christ, and the rosary helps believers come closer to Christ by contemplating Christ.

=== Spiritual bouquet ===
A spiritual bouquet is a collection of prayers and spiritual actions given or offered up for a specific purpose.

== Learning to pray ==
Although many promises are associated with prayer, in his 1982 book The Way to Christ Pope John Paul II warned against "mechanical prayer" and pointed out the need for self-reflection before prayer. And in his message for the 42nd "World Day of Prayer" in 2005 he invoked:

"We have to learn to pray: as it were learning this art ever anew from the lips of the Divine Master himself, like the first disciples: 'Lord, teach us to pray!' (Lk 11:1)."

In the Catholic tradition, there are many legends about the power of persistent prayer. In the fourth century, Monica of Hippo is said to have prayed for the conversion of her son Augustine for fourteen years and he eventually became an influential figure in Christian thought.

== See also ==
- Christian devotional literature
- Christian prayer
  - Catholic prayers to Jesus
  - Fátima prayers
