= Saint John Vianney's prayer to Jesus =

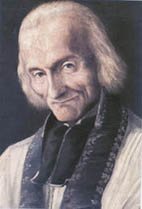
St. John Vianney

Saint John Vianney, the patron saint of parish priests, composed his prayer to Jesus in the 19th century.

The prayer reflects Vianney's deep religious feelings, which were praised by Pope John XXIII in his encyclical Sacerdotii nostri primordia in 1959: "The thing that keeps us priests from gaining sanctity" - the Cure of Ars used to say - "is thoughtlessness. It annoys us to turn our minds away from external affairs; we don't know what we really ought to do. What we need is deep reflection, together with prayer and an intimate union with God." The testimony of his life makes it clear that he always remained devoted to his prayers and that not even the duty of hearing confessions or any other pastoral office could cause him to neglect them. "Even in the midst of tremendous labors, he never let up on his conversation with God."

The prayer is quoted in the Catechism of the Catholic Church.

== Words of the prayer ==
I love You, O my God, and my only desire is to love You until the last breath of my life.
I love You, O my infinitely lovable God, and I would rather die loving You, than live without loving You.
I love You, Lord and the only grace I ask is to love You eternally...
My God, if my tongue cannot say in every moment that I love You, I want my heart to repeat it to You as often as I draw breath.
