= Anima Christi =

Medieval Christian prayer

The "Anima Christi" (Latin for ‘Soul of Christ’) is a traditional Christian prayer to Jesus used in the Roman Catholic and Evangelical-Lutheran traditions. It is of medieval origin and in this Christian prayer, the "supplicant contemplates the suffering body of Christ on the cross and pleads to be concealed within his wounds."

== History ==
For many years the prayer was popularly believed to have been composed by Saint Ignatius of Loyola, as he puts it at the beginning of his Spiritual Exercises and often refers to it. In the first edition of the Spiritual Exercises Ignatius merely mentions it, evidently supposing that the reader would know it. In later editions, it was printed in full. It was by assuming that everything in the book was written by Ignatius that it came to be looked upon as his composition. On this account the prayer is sometimes referred to as the Aspirations of St. Ignatius Loyola.

However, the prayer actually dates to the early 14th century and was possibly written by Pope John XXII, but its authorship remains uncertain. It has been found in a number of prayer books printed during the youth of Ignatius and is in manuscripts which were written 100 years before his birth. The English hymnologist James Mearns found it in a manuscript of the British Museum which dates back to about 1370. In the library of Avignon there is preserved a prayer book of Cardinal Pierre de Luxembourg (died 1387), which contains the prayer in practically the same form as that in which it appears today. It has also been found inscribed on one of the gates of the Alcázar of Seville, which dates back to the time of Pedro the Cruel (1350–1369).

The invocations in the prayer have rich associations with Catholic and Lutheran concepts that relate to the Real presence of Christ in the Eucharist (Body and Blood of Christ), Baptism (water) and the Passion of Jesus (Holy Wounds).

== Text ==
Latin text	Literal English translation	Translation by Saint John Henry Newman
Anima Christi, sanctifica me. Corpus Christi, salva me. Sanguis Christi, inebria me. Aqua lateris Christi, lava me. Passio Christi, conforta me. O bone Jesu, exaudi me. Intra tua vulnera absconde me. Ne permittas me separari a te. Ab hoste maligno defende me. In hora mortis meae voca me. Et jube me venire ad te, Ut cum Sanctis tuis laudem te, In saecula saeculorum. Amen.	Soul of Christ, sanctify me Body of Christ, save me Blood of Christ, inebriate me Water from the side of Christ, wash me Passion of Christ, strengthen me O good Jesus, hear me Within Thy wounds hide me Suffer me not to be separated from Thee From the malignant enemy defend me In the hour of my death call me And bid me come unto Thee That with Thy Saints I may praise Thee Forever and ever. Amen.	Soul of Christ, be my sanctification; Body of Christ, be my salvation; Blood of Christ, fill all my veins; Water of Christ's side, wash out my stains; Passion of Christ, my comfort be; O good Jesus, listen to me; In Thy wounds I fain would hide; Ne'er to be parted from Thy side; Guard me, should the foe assail me; Call me when my life shall fail me; Bid me come to Thee above, With Thy saints to sing Thy love, World without end. Amen.

In the mid-19th century the prayer was translated and published as the English hymn Soul of my Saviour, sanctify my breast by Edward Caswall. Since then it has been popular as a communion hymn in Anglican and Catholic communities and has been included in some 43 different hymnals.

== Indulgence ==
In the Catholic Church, the 2004 Enchiridion Indulgentiarum grants the partial indulgence to the faithful of Christ who prays the Anima Christi after having received Communion. Although not a part of the Maronite Catholic tradition, during the 21st century, the Anima Christi prayer is recited in some Maronite churches in the United States at the end of the Mass.

== Musical adaptations ==
Jean-Baptiste Lully composed a motet called Anima Christi, and musicians such as Giovanni Valentini have performed it. Liszt made two settings of it, both for male voices and organ, in 1874 [published in the Breitkopf Franz-Liszt-Stiftung, volume V/6 (1936)]. There is a contemporary Catholic composition by Marco Frisina. Lutheran adaptions include those by Heinrich Schütz (SWV 325) and Johann Theile. The hymn 'Soul of my Saviour' is an English translation of this prayer by J. Hegarty, and music of Jesuit priest William J. Maher (Bristol, 1823). The song “Anima Christi” was published by the group Floriani in 2024, on their album titled “Chants of Deliverance”.
