= Saint Louis de Montfort's Prayer to Jesus =

Saint Louis de Montfort's Prayer to Jesus is a prayer by Saint Louis de Montfort. It is a reflection of his philosophy of "total consecration to Jesus Christ through Mary", a theme that centuries later influenced the development of Roman Catholic Mariology.

== Description ==
Although St Louis is perhaps best known for his Mariology and devotion to the Blessed Virgin Mary, his spirituality is founded on the mystery of the Incarnation of Jesus Christ, and is centered on Christ, as reflected in his motto, God Alone.

As the prayer suggests, St. Louis introduced the key concepts that underlie Roman Catholic Mariology today: that Jesus and Mary are son and mother, redeemer and redeemed and that the path to Jesus is through Mary. Theologically, the prayer reflects the inherent inclusion of Mariology in Christology. This concept was echoed by Pope John Paul II about his reading of Montfort's works:

Then I understood that I could not exclude the Lord's Mother from my life without neglecting the will of God-Trinity.

== Words of the prayer ==
O most loving Jesus, deign to let me pour forth my gratitude before Thee, for the grace Thou hast bestowed upon me in giving me to Thy holy Mother through the devotion of Holy Bondage, that she may be my advocate in the presence of Thy majesty and my support in my extreme misery.

Alas, O Lord! I am so wretched that without this dear Mother I should be certainly lost. Yes, Mary is necessary for me at Thy side and everywhere that she may appease Thy just wrath, because I have so often offended Thee; that she may save me from the eternal punishment of Thy justice, which I deserve; that she may contemplate Thee, speak to Thee, pray to Thee, approach Thee and please Thee; that she may help me to save my soul and the souls of others; in short, Mary is necessary for me that I may always do Thy holy will and seek Thy greater glory in all things.

Ah, would that I could proclaim throughout the whole world the mercy that Thou hast shown to me ! Would that everyone might know I should be already damned, were it not for Mary! Would that I might offer worthy thanksgiving for so great a blessing! Mary is in me.

Oh, what a treasure! Oh, what a consolation! And shall I not be entirely hers? Oh, what ingratitude! My dear Saviour, send me death rather than such a calamity, for I would rather die than live without belonging entirely to Mary. With St. John the Evangelist at the foot of the Cross, I have taken her a thousand times for my own and as many times have given myself to her; but if I have not yet done it as Thou, dear Jesus, dost wish, I now renew this offering as Thou dost desire me to renew it.

And if Thou seest in my soul or my body anything that does not belong to this august Princess, I pray Thee to take it and cast it far from me, for whatever in me does not belong to Mary is unworthy of Thee.

O Holy Spirit, grant me all these graces. Plant in my soul the Tree of true Life, which is Mary; cultivate it and tend it so that it may grow and blossom and bring forth the fruit of life in abundance.

O Holy Spirit, give me great devotion to Mary, Thy faithful spouse; give me great confidence in her maternal heart and an abiding refuge in her mercy, so that by her Thou mayest truly form in me Jesus Christ, great and mighty, unto the fullness of His perfect age. Amen.
