= Praise and worship =

Praise and worship may refer to:

- Christian worship
  - Contemporary worship
    - Contemporary worship music
- Jewish prayer
- Ibadah, Islamic worship
- Worship in Hinduism
- Praise & Worship, a 2006 album by Commissioned

== See also ==
- Praise (disambiguation)
- Worship (disambiguation)
