= Shoulder wound of Jesus =

Traditional Christian prayer

The traditional prayer in honor of the shoulder wound of Jesus calls to mind the wound that Jesus is said to have received carrying the cross on which he was crucified. It is variously attributed to Saint Bernard of Clairvaux or to Saint Gertrude or Saint Mechtilde.

According to pious legend, Saint Bernard asked Jesus which was his greatest unrecorded suffering and the wound that inflicted the most pain on him in Calvary. Jesus answered: "I had on my shoulder, while I bore my cross on the Way of Sorrows, a grievous wound which was more painful than the others and which is not recorded by men."

== Prayer ==
In English:

"O Loving Jesus, Meek Lamb of God, I, a miserable sinner, salute and worship the most sacred wound of thy shoulder on which thou didst bear thy heavy cross, which so tore thy flesh and laid bare thy bones as to inflict on thee an anguish greater than any other wound of thy most blessed body. I adore thee, O Jesus most sorrowful; I praise and glorify thee and give thee thanks for this most sacred and painful wound, beseeching thee by that exceeding pain and by the crushing burden of thy heavy cross, to be merciful to me, a sinner, to forgive me all my mortal and venial sins and to lead me on towards Heaven along the Way of Thy Cross. Amen."

The modern version of the prayer bears the imprimatur of Thomas Daniel Beaven, who was the Bishop of Springfield in Massachusetts from 1892 to 1920.

== Revelation to Padre Pio ==
Padre Pio of Pietrelcina venerated the shoulder wound of Jesus, and bore it himself as a stigmata.

According to Stefano Campanella, author of "Il papa e il frate" (The Pope and the Friar), Karol Wojtyła (the future Pope John Paul II), while still a priest, visited Padre Pio and asked the question of which was his most painful wound – much like the manner Bernard did to Christ. Wojtyła expected that it was Pio's chest wound, but Pio replied: "It is my shoulder wound, which no one knows about and has never been cured or treated".

== Other allusions to the injury ==
The visions of Blessed Anne Catherine Emmerich, which also were a source of The Passion of the Christ, refer to the injury: “There was a frightful wound on the shoulder which had borne the weight of the Cross..." When scientists studied the Shroud of Turin, they found one of Jesus's shoulders had a laceration and was dislocated. Psalm 22 also references it: "I am poured out like water, and all my bones are out of joint.."

== See also ==
- First Thursdays Devotion
- Christian prayer
