= Pope Benedict XVI bibliography =

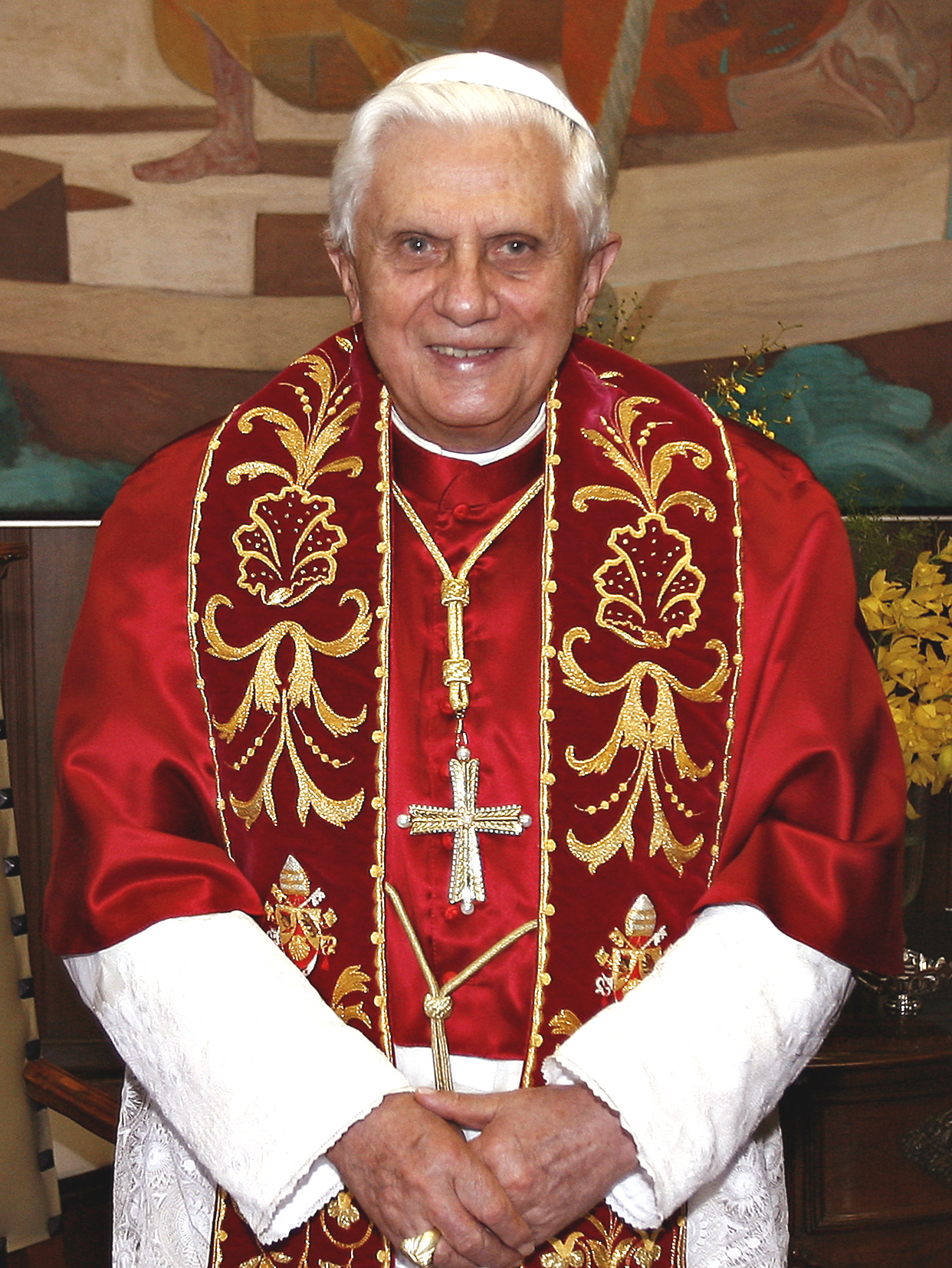
- Books↙: 66
- Encyclicals↙: 3
- Exhortations↙: 4
- German titles↙: 50

The Pope Benedict XVI bibliography contains a list of works by Pope Benedict XVI.

== Books ==
The following is a list of books written by Pope Benedict XVI arranged chronologically by English first edition. The original German first edition publication year is included in brackets.

- Theological Highlights of Vatican II. New York: Paulist Press. 1966 [1963]. ISBN 978-0-8091-4610-9. (Note: This book was originally published in German in four volumes: Die erste Sitzungsperiode des Zweiten Vatikanischen Konzils (1963), Das Konzil auf dem Weg (1964), Ergebnisse und Probleme der dritten Konzilsperiode (1965), and Die letzte Sitzungsperiode des Konzils (1966).)
- Introduction to Christianity. London: Burns & Oats. 1968 [1968]. ISBN 978-0-223-97705-1.
- Faith and Future. Chicago: Franciscan Herald Press. 1971 [1970]. ISBN 978-1-58617-219-0.
- The God of Jesus Christ: Meditations on the Triune God. Chicago: Franciscan Herald Press. 1978 [1977]. ISBN 978-1-58617-184-1.
- Daughter Zion: Meditations on the Church's Marian Belief. Chicago: Franciscan Herald Press. 1983 [1977]. ISBN 978-0-89870-026-8.
- Dogma and Preaching. Chicago: Franciscan Herald Press. 1985 [1973]. ISBN 978-1-58617-327-2.
- Principles of Christian Morality. San Francisco: Ignatius Press. 1986 [1975]. ISBN 978-0-89870-086-2.
- Feast of Faith: Approaches to a Theology of the Liturgy. San Francisco: Ignatius Press. 1986 [1981]. ISBN 978-0-89870-056-5.
- The Ratzinger Report: An Exclusive Interview on the State of the Church. San Francisco: Ignatius Press. 1986 [1985]. ISBN 978-0-89870-080-0.
- Seek That Which Is Above: Meditations through the Year. San Francisco: Ignatius Press. 1986 [1985]. ISBN 978-1-58617-187-2.
- Behold the Pierced One: An Approach to a Spiritual Christology. San Francisco: Ignatius Press. 1986 [1984]. ISBN 978-0-89870-087-9.
- The Blessing of Christmas: Meditations for the Season. San Francisco: Ignatius Press. 1986. ISBN 978-1-58617-172-8.
- Principles of Catholic Theology: Building Stones for a Fundamental Theology. San Francisco: Ignatius Press. 1987 [1982]. ISBN 978-0-89870-215-6.
- Eschatology: Death and Eternal Life. Washington DC: Catholic University of America Press. 1988 [1977]. ISBN 978-0-8132-1516-7.
- Church, Ecumenism and Politics: New Essays in Ecclesiology. New York: Crossroad. 1988 [1987]. ISBN 978-1-58617-217-6.
- Ministers of Your Joy: Scriptural Meditations on Priestly Spirituality. Ann Arbor: Redeemer Books. 1989 [1988]. ISBN 978-0-89283-654-3.
- The Theology of History in St. Bonaventure. Chicago: Franciscan Herald Press. 1989 [1959]. ISBN 978-0-8199-0415-7.
- To Look on Christ: Exercises in Faith, Hope, and Love. New York: Crossroad. 1991 [1989]. ISBN 978-0-8245-1064-0.
- A Turning Point for Europe?. San Francisco: Ignatius Press. 1994 [1991]. ISBN 978-1-58617-349-4.
- The Nature and Mission of Theology: Essays to Orient Theology in Today's Debates. San Francisco: Ignatius Press. 1995 [1993]. ISBN 978-0-89870-538-6.
- In the Beginning...: A Catholic Understanding of the Story of Creation and the Fall. Grand Rapids: Eerdmans Publishing. 1995 [1986]. ISBN 978-0-8028-4106-3.
- Called to Communion: Understanding the Church Today. San Francisco: Ignatius Press. 1996 [1991]. ISBN 978-0-89870-578-2.
- A New Song for the Lord: Faith in Christ in Liturgy Today. New York: Crossroad. 1997 [1995]. ISBN 978-0-8245-1536-2.
- Salt of the Earth: The Church at the End of the Millennium. San Francisco: Ignatius Press. 1997 [1996]. ISBN 978-0-89870-640-6.
- Milestones: Memoirs 1927-1977. San Francisco: Ignatius Press. 1998 [1997]. ISBN 978-0-89870-702-1.
- Many Religions, One Covenant: Israel, the Church, and the World. San Francisco: Ignatius Press. 1999 [1997]. ISBN 978-0-89870-753-3.
- The Spirit of the Liturgy. San Francisco: Ignatius Press. 2000 [2000]. ISBN 978-0-89870-784-7.
- God and the World. San Francisco: Ignatius Press. 2002 [2000]. ISBN 978-0-89870-868-4.
- God Is Near Us: The Eucharist, the Heart of Life. San Francisco: Ignatius Press. 2003 [2001]. ISBN 978-0-89870-962-9.
- Truth and Tolerance: Christian Belief and World Religions. San Francisco: Ignatius Press. 2004 [2003]. ISBN 978-1-58617-035-6.
- Introduction to Christianity (revised ed.). San Francisco: Ignatius Press. 2004 [1968]. ISBN 978-1-58617-029-5.
- Pilgrim Fellowship of Faith: The Church as Communion. San Francisco: Ignatius Press. 2005 [2002]. ISBN 978-0-89870-963-6.
- Compendium of the Catechism of the Catholic Church. Washington DC: United States Conference of Catholic Bishops. 2005. ISBN 978-1-57455-720-6.
- Mary: The Church at the Source. San Francisco: Ignatius Press. 2005 [1997]. ISBN 978-1-58617-018-9.
- Way of the Cross. Boston: Pauline Books & Media. 2005. ISBN 978-0-8198-8308-7.
- On the Way to Jesus Christ. San Francisco: Ignatius Press. 2005. ISBN 978-1-58617-124-7.
- Christianity and the Crisis of Cultures. San Francisco: Ignatius Press. 2006 [2005]. ISBN 978-1-58617-142-1.
- Handing on the Faith in an Age of Disbelief. San Francisco: Ignatius Press. 2006 [1983]. ISBN 978-1-58617-143-8.
- Images of Hope: Meditations on Major Feasts. San Francisco: Ignatius Press. 2006 [1997]. ISBN 978-0-89870-964-3.
- God's Revolution: Pope Benedict XVI's Cologne Talks. San Francisco: Ignatius Press. 2006 [2004]. ISBN 978-1-58617-145-2.
- Values in a Time of Upheaval. San Francisco: Ignatius Press. 2006 [2004]. ISBN 978-0-8245-2373-2.
- God Is Love: Deus Caritas Est. San Francisco: Ignatius Press. 2006 [2006]. ISBN 978-1-58617-163-6.
- What It Means to Be a Christian. San Francisco: Ignatius Press. 2006 [1965]. ISBN 978-1-58617-133-9.
- Without Roots: The West, Relativism, Christianity, Islam. San Francisco: Basic Books. 2006. ISBN 978-0-465-00627-4.
- On Conscience. San Francisco: Ignatius Press. 2007 [1984]. ISBN 978-1-58617-160-5.
- Europe: Today and Tomorrow. San Francisco: Ignatius Press. 2007 [2004]. ISBN 978-1-58617-134-6.
- New Outpourings of the Spirit. San Francisco: Ignatius Press. 2007 [2006]. ISBN 978-1-58617-181-0.
- Jesus of Nazareth. New York: Doubleday. 2007 [2007]. ISBN 978-0-385-52341-7.
- Jesus, the Apostles, and the Early Church. San Francisco: Ignatius Press. 2007. ISBN 978-1-58617-220-6.
- God's Word: Scripture, Tradition, Office. San Francisco: Ignatius Press. 2008 [2005]. ISBN 978-1-58617-179-7.
- Saved in Hope: Spe Salvi. San Francisco: Ignatius Press. 2008 [2007]. ISBN 978-1-58617-251-0.
- The Fathers. Huntington: Our Sunday Visitor. 2008. ISBN 978-1-59276-440-2.
- Church Fathers: From Clement of Rome to Augustine. San Francisco: Ignatius Press. 2008. ISBN 978-1-58617-245-9.
- Charity in Truth: Caritas in Veritate. San Francisco: Ignatius Press. 2009 [2009]. ISBN 978-1-58617-280-0.
- Saint Paul. Huntington: Our Sunday Visitor. 2009 [2009]. ISBN 978-1-58617-367-8.
- The Joy of Knowing Christ: Meditations on the Gospels. Frederick: Word Among Us Press. 2009. ISBN 978-1-59325-151-2.
- Light of the World: The Pope, The Church, and the Signs of the Times. San Francisco: Ignatius Press. 2010. ISBN 978-1-58617-606-8.
- The Fathers, Volume II. Huntington: Our Sunday Visitor. 2010. ISBN 978-1-59276-783-0.
- The Apostles. Huntington: Our Sunday Visitor. 2010. ISBN 978-1-59276-799-1.
- The Virtues. Huntington: Our Sunday Visitor. 2010. ISBN 978-1-59276-794-6.
- Great Teachers. Huntington: Our Sunday Visitor. 2011. ISBN 978-1-59276-536-2.
- Holiness Is Always in Season. San Francisco: Ignatius Press. 2011. ISBN 978-1-58617-444-6.
- Jesus of Nazareth: Holy Week. Huntington: Our Sunday Visitor. 2011. ISBN 978-1-58617-500-9.
- Holy Women. Huntington: Our Sunday Visitor. 2011. ISBN 978-1-61278-510-3.
- Doctors of the Church. Huntington: Our Sunday Visitor. 2011. ISBN 978-1-61278-576-9.
- Jesus of Nazareth: The Infancy Narratives. Colorado Springs: Image Books. 2012. ISBN 978-0385346405.
- The Faith. Huntington: Our Sunday Visitor. 2013. ISBN 978-1612786674.
- Prayer. Huntington: Our Sunday Visitor. 2013. ISBN 978-1612787091.
- From the Depths of Our Hearts: Priesthood, Celibacy and the Crisis of the Catholic Church. San Francisco: Ignatius Press. 2020. ISBN 978-1621644149. (Note: This book was cowritten with Cardinal Robert Sarah.)
- What Is Christianity?: The Last Writings. San Francisco: Ignatius Press. 2023. ISBN 9781621646556.

== Encyclicals ==
The following is a list of papal encyclicals that were promulgated by Pope Benedict XVI.

- Deus caritas est (God is Love) (December 25, 2005) Text
- Spe salvi (In Hope We Were Saved) (November 30, 2007) Text
- Caritas in veritate (Charity in Truth) (June 29, 2009) Text

== Exhortations ==
The following is a list of apostolic exhortations written by Pope Benedict XVI. An apostolic exhortation is a type of communication from the Pope of the Roman Catholic Church that encourages a community of people to undertake a particular activity, but does not define Church doctrine. It is considered lower in formal authority than a papal encyclical, but higher than other ecclesiastical letters.

- Sacramentum Caritatis: On the Eucharist as the Source and Summit of the Church's Life and Mission (February 22, 2007) Text
- Verbum Domini: On the Word of God in the Life and Mission of the Church (September 30, 2010) Text
- Africae Munus: On the Church in Africa in Service to Reconciliation, Justice and Peace (November 19, 2011) Text
- Ecclesia in Medio Oriente: On the Church in the Middle East (September 14, 2012) Text

== German titles ==
The following is a list of books written by Pope Benedict XVI arranged chronologically by German first edition. The English title is included in parentheses.

- Volk und Haus Gottes in Augustins Lehre von der Kirche (The People and House of God as Presented in Augustine's Doctrine of the Church). München: Zink, 1954. (Note: This volume was submitted as Joseph Ratzinger's dissertation in 1951.)
- Die Geschichtstheologie des heiligen Bonaventura (The Historical Theology of Saint Bonaventure). München: Schnell und Steiner, 1959. (Note: This volume was submitted as Joseph Ratzinger's professorial dissertation.)
- Die christliche Brüderlichkeit (The Meaning of Christian Brotherhood). München, 1960.
- Die erste Sitzungsperiode des Zweiten Vatikanischen Konzils. Ein Rückblick (The First Session of the Second Vatican Council. A Retrospective). Köln: Bachem, 1963.
- Das Konzil auf dem Weg: Rückblick auf die 2. Sitzungsperiode des 2. Vatikanischen Konzils (The Council in Progress. Retrospective of the Second Session of the Second Vatican Council). Köln: Bachem, 1964.
- Ergebnisse und Probleme der dritten Konzilsperiode (Events and Issues of the Third Session of the Council). Köln: Bachem, 1965.
- Die letzte Sitzungsperiode des Konzils (The Council's Last Session). Köln: Bachem, 1966.
- Das Problem der Dogmengeschichte in der Sicht der katholischen Theologie (The Problem of Dogmatism from the Point of View of Catholic Theology). Köln, 1966.
- Die sakramentale Begründung christlicher Existenz. Meitingen und Freising: Kyrios-Verlag, 1967.
- Einführung in das Christentum: Vorlesungen über das Apostolische Glaubensbekenntis (Introduction to Christianity). München: Kösel Verlag, 1968.
- Meditationen zur Karwoche. Meitingen und Freising: Meitinger Kleinschriften, 1969.
- Das neue Volk Gottes: Entwürfe zur Ekklesiologie (God's New People: Concepts for Ecclesiology). Düsseldorf: Patmos-Verlag, 1969.
- Demokratie in der Kirche : Möglichkeiten, Grenzen, Gefahren. (Democracy in the Church: Possibilities, Limits, Dangers.) Joseph Ratzinger und Hans Maier. Limburg, Lahn Verlag, 1970
- Glaube und Zukunft (Faith and Future). München: Kösel Verlag, 1970.
- Die Einheit der Nationen: Eine Vision der Kirchenväter (The Unity of the Nations: A Vision of the Church Fathers). Salzburg: Pustet, 1971.
- Dogma und Verkündigung (Dogma and Preaching). München: Erich Wewel Verlag, 1973.
- Prinzipien christlicher Moral (Principles of Christian Morality). Einsiedln: Johannes Verlag, 1975.
- Eschatologie: Tod und ewiges Leben (Eschatology: Death, and Eternal Life). Regensburg: Friedrich Pustet Verlag, 1977.
- Der Gott Jesu Christi: Betrachtungen über den Dreieinigen Gott (God of Jesus Christ). München: Kösel Verlag, 1976.
- Die Tochter Zion: Betrachtungen über den Marienglaube der Kirche (Daughter Zion: Reflections on the Church's Marian Belief). Einsiedln: Johannes Verlag, 1977.
- Eucharistie - Mitte der Kirche. München: Wewel, 1978.
- Zum Begriff des Sakramentes (On the Concept of the Sacrament). München: Minerva Publikation, 1979.
- Umkehr zur Mitte: Meditationen eines Theologen (Turning back towards the Center: A Theologian's Meditations). Leipzig: Sankt-Benno-Verlag, 1981.
- Glaube, Erneuerung, Hoffnung. Theologisches Nachdenken über die heutige Situation der Kirche. Hrsg. von Kraning, Willi (Faith, Renewal, Hope. Theological Contemplations on the Present Situation of the Church). Leipzig: Sankt-Benno-Verlag, 1981.
- Das Fest des Glaubens: Versuche zur Theologie des Gottesdienstes (Feast of Faith: Approaches to a Theology of the Liturgy). Einsiedeln: Johannes Verlag, 1981.
- Theologische Prinzipienlehre: Bausteine zur Fundamentaltheologie (Principles of Catholic Theology: Building Stones for a Fundamental Theology). München: Erich Wewel Verlag, 1982.
- Die Krise der Katechese und ihre Uberwindung: Rede in Frankrich (Handing on the Faith in an Age of Disbelief). Einsiedeln: Johannes Verlag, 1983.
- Schauen auf den Durchbohrten (Behold the Pierced One). Einsiedeln: Johannes Verlag, 1984.
- Suchen, was droben ist: Meditationen das Jahr hindurch (Seek That Which Is Above: Meditations Throughout the Year). Freiburg im Breisgau: Verlag Herder, 1985.
- Politik und Erlösung: Zum Verhältnis von Glaube, Rationalität und Irrationalem in der sogenannten Theologie der Befreiung (Politics and Deliverance: On the Relations of Faith, Rationalism, and the Irrational in so-called Liberation Theology). Opladen: Westdeutscher Verlag, 1986.
- Im Anfang schuf Gott: Vier Predigten über Schöpfung und Fall (In the Beginning...: A Catholic Understanding of the Story of Creation and the Fall). München: Erich Wewel Verlag, 1986.
- Kirche, Ökumene und Politik: Neue Versuche zur Ekklesiologie (Church, Ecumenism, and Politics: New Endeavours in Ecclesiology). Einsiedeln: Johannes Verlag, 1987.
- Abbruch und Aufbruch: Die Antwort des Glaubens auf die Krise der Werte (Deconstruction and Awakening. The Answer of Faith to the Crisis of Values). München: Minerva Publikation, 1988.
- Auf Christus schauen: Einübung in Glaube, Hoffnung, Liebe (To Look on Christ: Exercises in Faith, Hope, and Love). Freiburg im Breisgau: Herder, 1989.
- Wendezet für Europa? Diagnosen und Prognosen zur Lage von Kirche und Welt (A Turning Point for Europe? The Church in the Modern World). Einsiedeln: Johannes Verlag, 1991.
- Zur Gemeinschaft gerufen: Kirche heute verstehen (Called to Communion. Understanding the Church Today). Freiburg im Breisgau: Herder, 1991.
- Wahrheit, Werte, Macht: Prüfsteine der pluralistischen Gesellschaft (Truth, Values, Power: The Cornerstones of a Pluralistic Society). Freiburg im Breisgau: Herder, 1993.
- Evangelium – Katechese – Katechismus: Steiflichter auf den Katechismis der katolischen Kirche (Gospel, Catechesis, Catechism). München: Verlag Neue Stadt, 1995.
- Ein neues Lied für den Herrn: Christusglaube und Liturgie in der Gegenwart (A New Song for the Lord). Freiburg im Breisgau: Verlag Herder, 1995.
- Salz der Erde. Christentum und katholische Kirche an der Jahrtausendwende (Salt of the Earth). München: Wilhelm Heyne Verlag, 1996.
- Vom Wiederauffinden der Mitte. Texte aus vier Jahrzehnten (Recovering the Center). Freiburg im Breisgau: Herder, 1997.
- Die Vielfalt der Religionen und der Eine Bund (Many Religions – One Covenant: Israel, the Church, and the World). Hagen: Verlag Urfeld, 1998.
- Demokratisierung der Kirche – dreißig Jahre danach. in: Hans Maier / Joseph Ratzinger, Demokratie in der Kirche. Möglichkeiten und Grenzen (= Topos plus Taschenbuch 348), Limburg / Kevelaer 2000, 78–92
- Einführung in den Geist der Liturgie (The Spirit of the Liturgy). 4. Aufl. Freiburg im Breisgau: Herder, 2000.
- Gott und die Welt. Glauben und Leben in unserer Welt. Ein Gespräch mit Peter Seewald (God and the World). Stuttgart: Deutsche Verlags-Anstalt, 2000.
- Gott ist uns nah: Eucharistie, Mitte des Lebens (God Is Near Us: The Eucharist, the Heart of Life). Augsburg : Sankt Ulrich, 2001.
- Weggemeinschaft des Glaubens: Krche als Communio (Pilgrim Fellowship of Faith: The Church as Communion). Augsburg: Sankt-Ulrich-Verlag, 2002.
- Glaube – Wahrheit – Toleranz. Das Christentum und die Weltreligionen (Truth and Tolerance). 2. Aufl. Freiburg im Breisgau: Verlag Herder, 2003.
- Unterwegs zu Jesus Christus (On the Way to Jesus Christ). Augsburg: Sankt-Ulrich-Verlag, 2003.
- Werte in Zeiten des Umbruchs (Values in a Time of Upheaval). Freiburg im Breisgau: Verlag Herder, 2005.
- Dialektik der Säkularisierung (The Dialectics of Secularization). Freiburg im Breisgau: Verlag Herder, 2005.
- Jesus von Nazareth, Erster Teil, Von der Taufe im Jordan bis zur Verklärung (Jesus of Nazareth, Part I: From the Baptism in the Jordan to the Transfiguration). Freiburg im Breisgau: Verlag Herder, 2007.
