= Maurice Casey =

British New Testament scholar

- Born: Philip Maurice Casey; 18 October 1942; Sunderland, England
- Died: 10 May 2014 (aged 71); Nottingham, England
- Occupations: Professor of New Testament Languages and Literature

Academic background
- Education: Durham University (BA, PhD)
- Thesis: The interpretation of Daniel VII in Jewish and Patristic literature and in the New Testament: an approach to the Son of man problem

Academic work
- Institutions: University of Nottingham

Philip Maurice Casey (18 October 1942 – 10 May 2014) was a British scholar of New Testament and early Christianity. He was an emeritus professor at the University of Nottingham, having served there as Professor of New Testament Languages and Literature at the Department of Theology.

== Biography ==
Casey was born in Sunderland. His father was the Anglican vicar of Wheatley Hill, but after his death his mother moved to Chevington and Casey to boarding school at Woodbridge School, Suffolk. He entered St Chad's College, Durham University having intended to become an Anglican priest, but changed his views in 1962 while completing his undergraduate degree in theology. Casey stated that he had not held any religious beliefs since. Following his degree in theology, he took a further degree in classical and general literature. He then taught classics at Spalding High School, an all-girls grammar school, from 1967 to 1971.

He returned to Durham University to study for a Doctor of Philosophy (PhD) degree in divinity, at first intending to study the historical figure of Jesus. His PhD was awarded in 1977 for a doctoral thesis titled "The interpretation of Daniel VII in Jewish and patristic literature and in the New Testament: an approach to the Son of Man problem". His doctoral supervisor was C. K. Barrett.

Following his PhD, Casey was a research fellow under Matthew Black at the University of St Andrews. In 1979, he joined the University of Nottingham as a lecturer. He delivered the Cadbury Lectures at the University of Birmingham in 1985. By 1996, he was Reader in Early Jewish and Christian Studies, and later promoted to Professor of New Testament Languages and Literature. He retired in 2006, and was made professor emeritus.

Casey died in Nottingham on 10 May 2014, at the age of 71.

== Fields of study ==
=== Aramaic sources behind the New Testament ===
Casey's work argued strongly for Aramaic sources behind the New Testament documents, specifically for Q and the Gospel of Mark.

Casey's Aramaic ideas were challenged by Stanley E. Porter in Excursus: A response to Maurice Casey on the Languages of Jesus citing modern scholarship, that the linguistic environment of Roman Palestine was probably multilingual.

=== Son of Man ===
He also contributed works on early Christology and the use of the term Son of Man within the New Testament Gospels in reference to Jesus.

== Positions about Jesus ==
Casey described himself as an independent scholar, who did not serve the interests of any religious faith or anti-religious group. He believed that Jesus really existed, but did not believe in his divinity. He criticized Christian fundamentalists who accept incredible miracles (such as Jesus walking on water), Christian churches that refuse to grasp the Jewishness of Jesus, mythicists who reject everything about Jesus, and even some liberal scholars, such as the Jesus Seminar, who viewed Jesus as a kind of cynical philosopher, and gave credence to the earliest apocryphal writings, such as the Gospel of Thomas and the Gospel of Peter. Casey believed that the documents on Jesus of greatest historical value are the Gospel of Mark and the Pauline epistles. According to Casey, Jesus would preach, heal people with psychosomatic disorders, and be crucified and buried, but would not be physically resurrected; the story of the empty tomb is, according to his views, a legend. After Jesus' death, his disciples and his brother James would have some visions of him. Casey has criticized Pope Benedict XVI for his books about Jesus (Jesus of Nazareth, Jesus of Nazareth: The Infancy Narratives and Jesus of Nazareth: Holy Week), accusing the pontiff of using sources that are, in his views, unreliable, like the Gospel of John.

Casey also held some unconventional views about the New Testament: for example, he believed that the Gospel of Mark was written in c. 40 AD (while most scholars believe that it was written in c. 70 AD) and that the Gospel of John is completely deprived of historicity (whereas most scholars believe that at least some historical kernels can be found in that text as well).

== Works ==
=== Thesis ===
- Casey, Maurice (1976). The interpretation of Daniel VII in Jewish and Patristic literature and in the New Testament: an approach to the Son of man problem (Ph.D.). London: British Library. OCLC 640114346.

=== Books ===
- ——— (1979). Son of Man : The Interpretation and Influence of Daniel 7. London: SPCK. ISBN 9780281036974. OCLC 6338109.
- ——— (1991). From Jewish Prophet to Gentile God: The Origins and Development of New Testament Christology. Edward Cadbury lectures, 1985-86. Cambridge, England & Louisville, KY: T&T Clark & Westminster John Knox Press. ISBN 9780227679203. OCLC 24302203.
- ——— (1996). Is John's Gospel True?. London & New York: Routledge. ISBN 9780415146302. OCLC 36061908.
- ——— (1998). Aramaic Sources of Mark's Gospel. Society for New Testament Studies - Monograph Series. Vol. 102. Cambridge & New York: Cambridge University Press. ISBN 9780511035975. OCLC 49726109.
- ——— (2002). An Aramaic Approach to Q : Sources for the Gospels of Matthew and Luke. Society for New Testament Studies - Monograph Series. Vol. 122. Cambridge, UK & New York: Cambridge University Press. ISBN 9780511061158. OCLC 57146437.
- ——— (2007). The Solution to The "Son of Man" Problem. Library of New Testament Studies. Vol. 343. London & New York: T & T Clark. ISBN 9780567140494. OCLC 741690930.
- ——— (2010). Jesus of Nazareth: An Independent Historian's Account of His Life and Teaching. London & New York: T & T Clark. ISBN 9780567104083. OCLC 858048706.
- ——— (2014). Jesus: Evidence and Argument Or Mythicist Myths?. London: T & T Clark. ISBN 9780567447623. OCLC 858358284.

=== Chapters ===
- ——— (2008). "Response to Michael Bird". In Bird, Michael F.; Crossley, James G. (eds.). How did Christianity begin?: a believer and non-believer examine the evidence. London & Peabody, MA: SPCK & Hendrickson Publishers. ISBN 9780281058501. OCLC 233940908.

== Festschrift ==
- Crossley, James G., ed. (2008). Judaism, Jewish Identities, and the Gospel Tradition: Essays in Honour of Maurice Casey. London & Oakville, CT: Equinox Pub. ISBN 9781845532833. OCLC 136778670.
