= Versus populum =

Liturgical stance

The bishop of Stockholm (Church of Sweden) elevates the host towards the congreagation during a liturgy celebrated versus populum

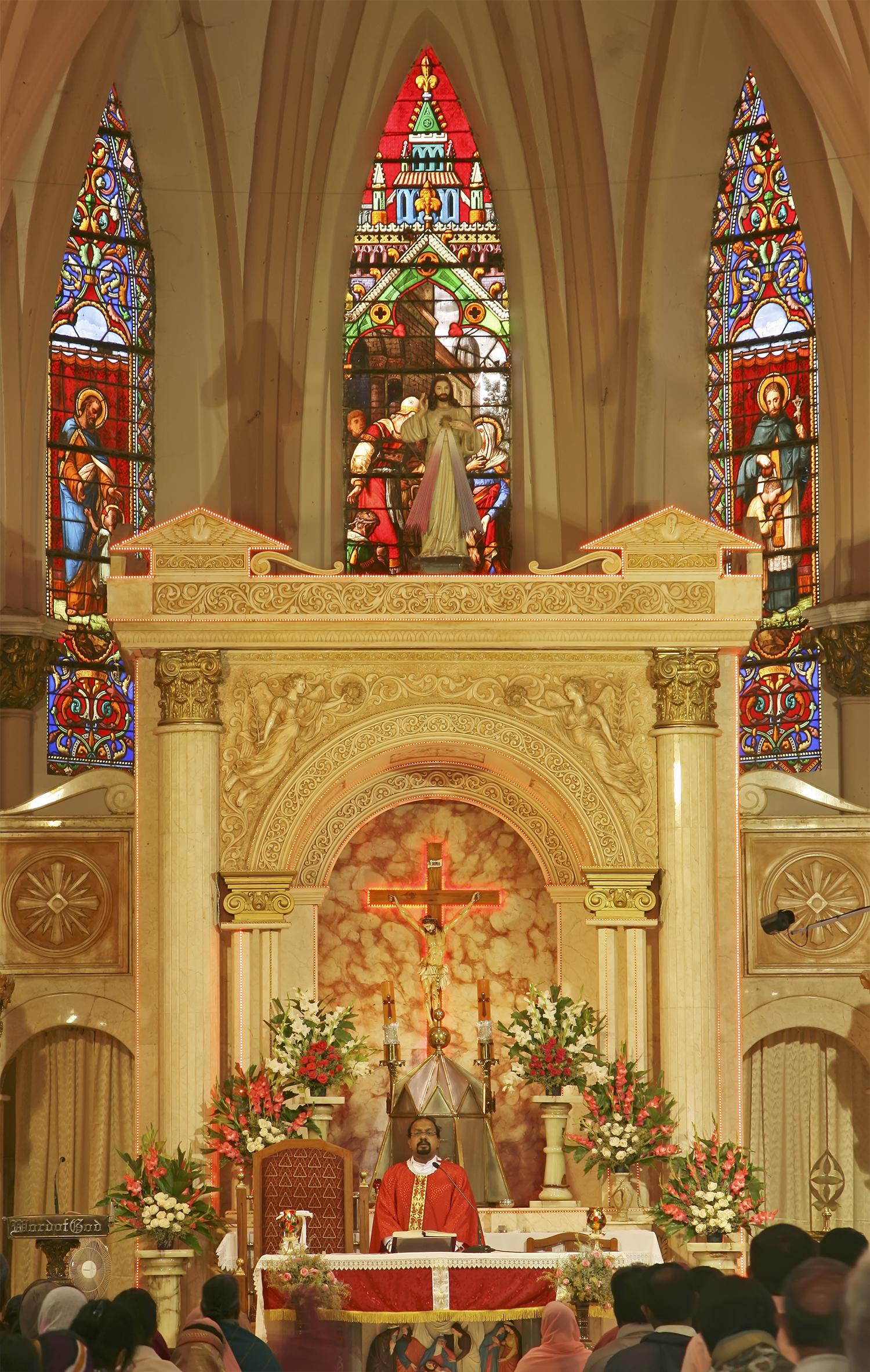
Mass is celebrated in the Basilica of St. Mary in Bangalore, India. The assembly can be seen facing the altar from one side, while the priest faces it from the other side with his back to the tabernacle.

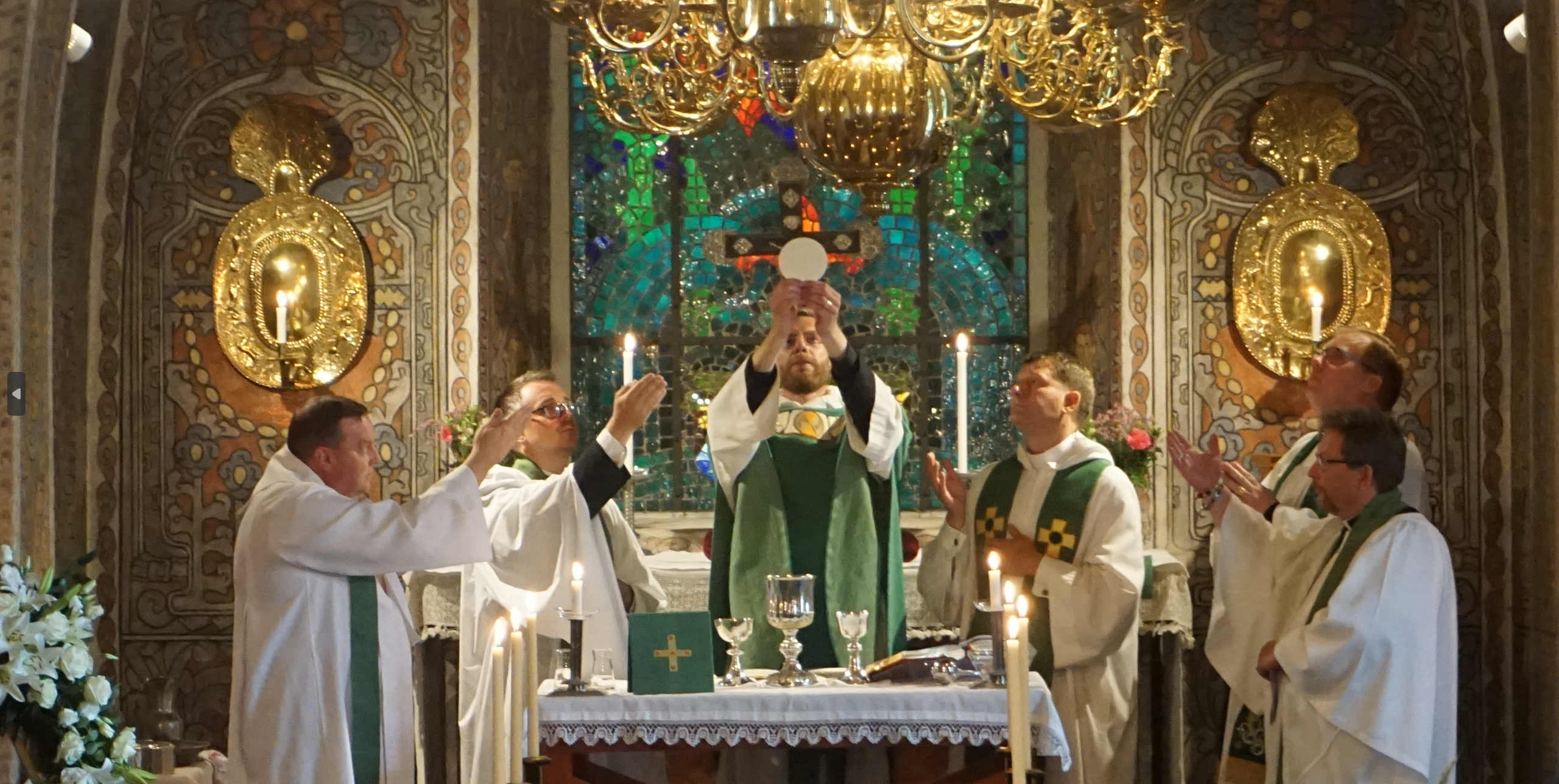
Evangelical-Lutheran priest elevating the host during the Mass, celebrated versus populum, at Alsike Church, Sweden

Versus populum (Latin for "towards the people") is the liturgical stance of a priest who, while celebrating Mass, faces the people from the other side of the altar. The opposite stance, that of a priest facing in the same direction as the people, is today called ad orientem (literally, "towards the east" − even if the priest is really facing in some other direction) or ad apsidem ("towards the apse" − even if the altar is unrelated to the apse of the church or even if the church or chapel has no apse).

In the early history of Christianity it was considered the norm to pray facing the geographical east. From the middle of the 17th century, almost all new Roman Rite altars were built against a wall or backed by a reredos, with a tabernacle placed on the main altar or inserted into the reredos. The altars of Evangelical-Lutheran churches were built against the eastern wall of the church, likewise. This meant that the priest turned to the people, putting his back to the altar, for a few short moments at Mass.

The celebration of the Mass versus populum was suggested in 1526 by Martin Luther in the German Mass who stated that "the priest should always turn himself towards the people as, without doubt, Christ did at the Last Supper" though he noted that immediately implementing this liturgical stance was not compulsory, and that versus populum might become the normative practice with time. After the Second Vatican Council, Catholic churches "pulled the altar from the wall and made it appear to be a table" and Evangelical-Lutheran churches constructed after that time generally followed the same practice, which allowed the presider "to face the congregation as a gathered community".

== History ==
=== Earliest churches in Rome ===
It has been said that the reason the Pope always faced the people when celebrating Mass in St Peter's was that early Christians faced eastward when praying and, due to the difficult terrain, the basilica was built with its apse to the west. Some have attributed this orientation in other early Roman churches to the influence of Saint Peter's. However, the arrangement whereby the apse with the altar is at the west end of the church and the entrance on the east is found also in Roman churches contemporary with Saint Peter's (such as the original Basilica of Saint Paul Outside the Walls) that were under no such constraints of terrain, and the same arrangement remained the usual one until the sixth century. According to Klaus Gamber, in this early layout the people were situated not in the central nave but in the side aisles of the church and, while the priest faced both the altar and east throughout the Mass, the people faced the altar (from the sides) until the high point of the Mass, when they would turn to face east, the direction in which the priest was already facing. This view is strongly criticized on the grounds of the unlikelihood that, in churches where the altar was to the west, they would turn their backs on the altar (and the priest) at the celebration of the Eucharist.

=== Later pre-twentieth-century churches in Rome ===
It was in the 8th or 9th century that the position whereby the priest faced the apse, not the people, when celebrating Mass was adopted in Rome, under the influence of the Frankish Empire, where it had become general. However, in several churches in Rome, it was physically impossible, even before the twentieth-century liturgical reforms, for the priest to celebrate Mass facing away from the people, because of the presence, immediately in front of the altar, of the "confession" (Latin: confessio), an area sunk below floor level to enable people to come close to the tomb of the saint buried beneath the altar. The best-known such "confession" is that in St Peter's Basilica, but many other churches in Rome have the same architectural feature, including at least one, the present Basilica of Saint Paul Outside the Walls, which, although the original Constantinian basilica was arranged like St Peter's, is oriented since 386 in such a way that the priest faces west when celebrating Mass.

=== Outside of Rome ===
The earliest Christian churches were not built with any particular orientation in mind, but by the fifth century it became the rule in the Eastern Roman Empire to have the altar at the east end of the church, an arrangement that became normal but not universal in northern Europe. The old Roman custom of having the altar at the west end and the entrance at the east was sometimes followed as late as the 11th century even in areas under Frankish rule, as seen in Petershausen (Constance), Bamberg Cathedral, Augsburg Cathedral, Regensburg Cathedral, and Hildesheim Cathedral (all in present-day Germany). In the east also, the original Constantinian Church of the Holy Sepulchre in Jerusalem had its apse to the west until it was Byzantinized in 1048.

== Modernity ==
=== Pius Parsch ===
The Augustinian Canon Pius Parsch as a military chaplain in World War I and later as priest at St. Gertrude's in Austria popularized what was called a "liturgical Mass" that was said Versus populum. While the practice was permitted, it was considered liturgically advanced at the time.

=== Roman Rite ===
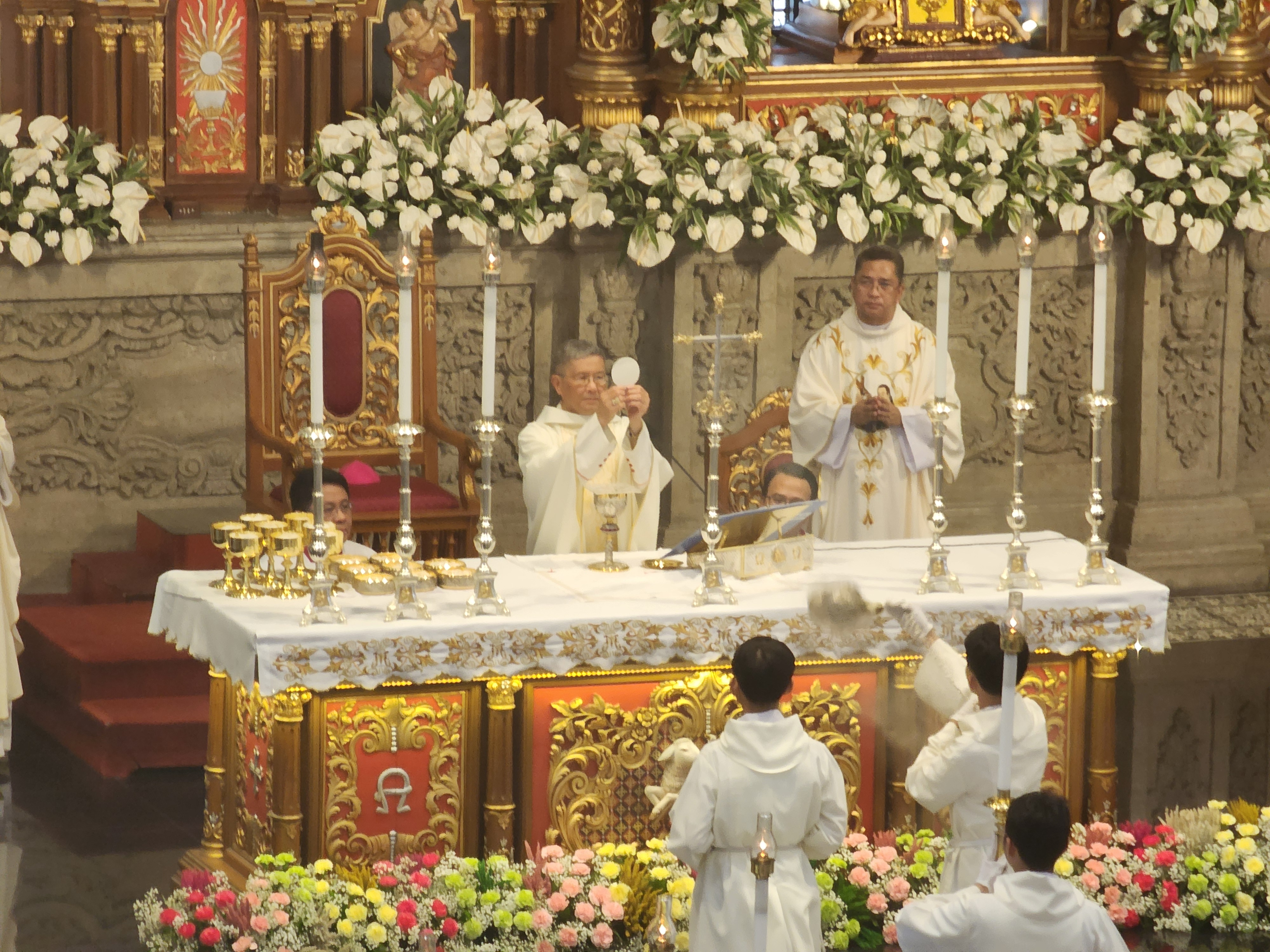
A Roman Rite Novus Ordo Pontifical Mass celebrated versus populum in Marikina, Philippines

In the Roman Rite of the Catholic Church, the altar is "the center of thanksgiving that the Eucharist accomplishes" and the point around which the other rites are in some manner arrayed. Its importance was made evident by Romano Guardini (1885–1968), about whom Robert R. Kuehn wrote: "with him [Guardini] on the altar, the sacred table became the center of the universe" [...] The impact of the sacred action was all the more profound because Guardini celebrated the Mass versus populum – facing the people."

==== Roman Missal ====
The present (2002) General Instruction of the Roman Missal says, in the official English translation: "The altar should be built separate from the wall, in such a way that it is possible to walk around it easily and that Mass can be celebrated at it facing the people, which is desirable wherever possible." Where practicable, the church altar should be built in such a way that the priest can easily walk around it and can celebrate Mass versus populum. But at least one popular priest, who resists the liturgical reforms of Vatican II ecumenical council, tends to suggest that the text does not oblige the priest to avail of these possibilities. In actual practice throughout the Roman Catholic Church, popes, cardinals, archbishops, bishops and priests, by their constant examples since the current form of the Roman Missal was initially promulgated, have been nearly unanimous in adopting versus populum as the defining orientation for the priest during the Mass.

In practice, after the Second Vatican Council, altars that obliged the priest to have his back to the people were generally moved away from the wall or reredos, or, where this was unsuitable, a new freestanding altar was built closer to the people. This, however, is not universal, and in some older churches and chapels it is physically impossible for the priest to face the people throughout the Mass, as before 1970 some churches, especially in Rome, had altars at which it was physically impossible for the priest not to face the people throughout the Mass.

The present Roman Missal prescribes that the priest should face the people at six points of the Mass:

- When giving the opening greeting (GIRM 124);
- When giving the invitation to pray, Orate, fratres (GIRM 146);
- When giving the greeting of peace, Pax Domini sit semper vobiscum (GIRM 154);
- When displaying the consecrated Host (or Host and Chalice) before Communion and saying: Ecce Agnus Dei (GIRM 157);
- When inviting to pray (Oremus) before the prayer after communion (GIRM 165);
- When giving the final blessing (Ordo Missae 141).

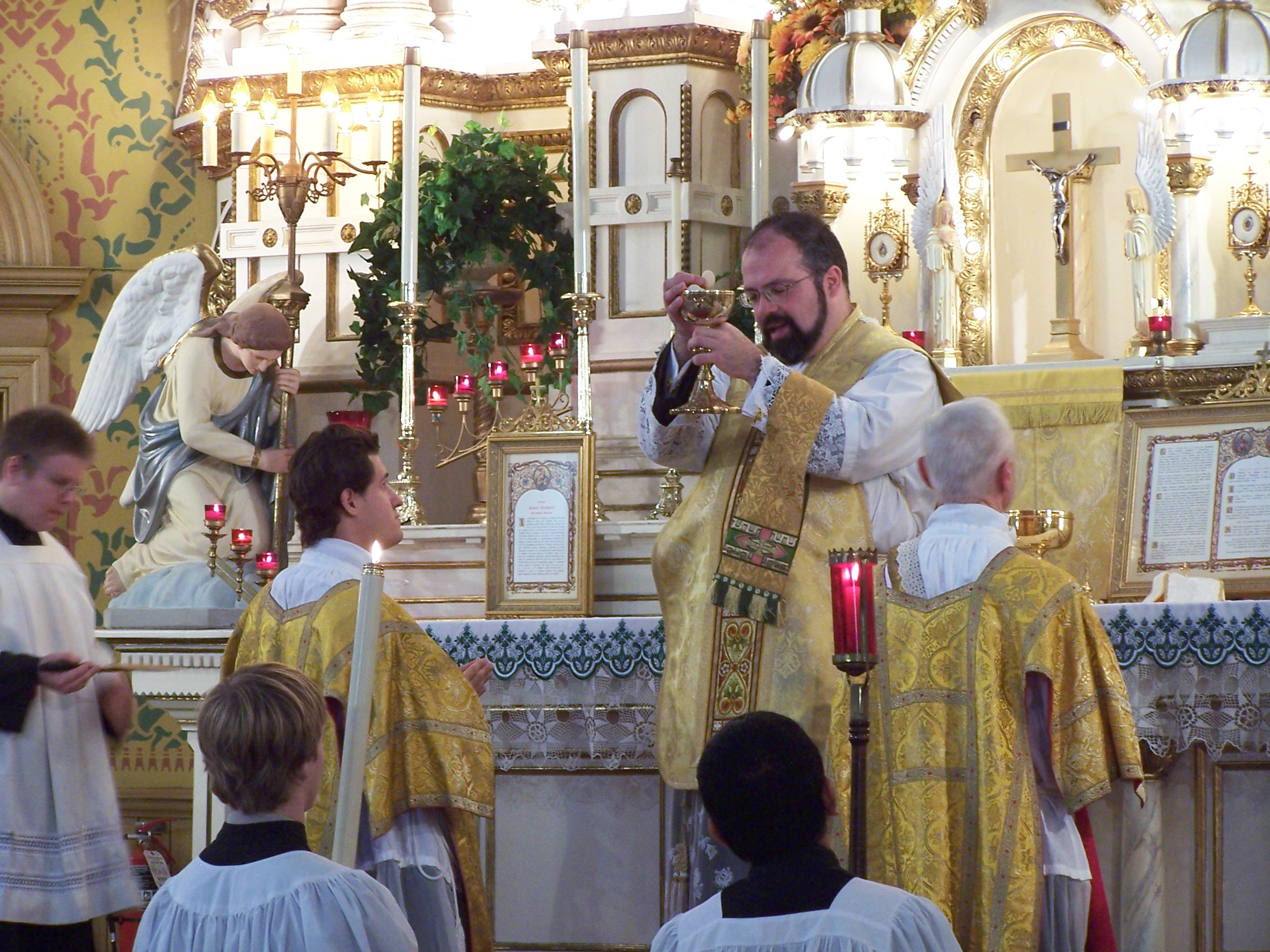
A priest facing the congregation as he says Ecce Agnus Dei at a Solemn Tridentine Mass.

The Tridentine Roman Missal requires the priest to face the people, without looking at them, since he is directed to have his eyes cast down to the ground (Ritus servandus, V, 1; VII, 7; XII, 1), and, if he is at the same side of the altar as the people, to turn his back to the altar, eight times:

- When greeting the people (Dominus vobiscum) before the collect (Ritus servandus in celebratione Missae, V, 1);
- When greeting the people (Dominus vobiscum) before the offertory rite (Ritus servandus, VII, 1);
- When giving the invitation to pray, Orate, fratres (Ritus servandus, VII, 7);
- Twice before giving Communion to others, first when saying the two prayers after the Confiteor, and again while displaying a consecrated Host and saying Ecce Agnus Dei; (Ritus servandus, X, 6);
- When greeting the people (Dominus vobiscum) before the prayer after communion (Ritus servandus, XI, 1);
- When saying Ite, missa est (Ritus servandus, XI, 1);
- When giving the last part of the final blessing (Ritus servandus, XII, 1).

The Tridentine and the Vatican II editions of the Roman Missal expressly direct the priest to face the altar at exactly the same points. His position in relation to the altar and the people determines whether facing the altar means also facing the people.

However, the present Roman Missal does not direct the priest to turn, that is, to change his direction from toward the people to away from the people. In this sense, the word face, as it is defined, can readily be understood as focusing one's attention, whether on the people gathered in front of the priest or on the altar in front of the priest, while the priest is in a versus populum posture.

==== Tabernacle on the altar ====
In the second half of the 17th century, it became customary to place the tabernacle on the main altar of the church. When a priest celebrates Mass at such an altar with his back to the people, he sometimes necessarily turns his back directly to the Blessed Sacrament, as when he turns to the people at the Orate fratres. This seeming disrespect is absent when the priest stands on the side of the altar away from the people; but locating so large an object on the altar is arguably inconvenient for a celebration in which the priest faces the people. Accordingly, the revised Roman Missal states:

[I]t is preferable that the tabernacle be located, according to the judgment of the Diocesan Bishop,

a. Either in the sanctuary, apart from the altar of celebration, in a form and place more appropriate, not excluding on an old altar no longer used for celebration;
b. Or even in some chapel suitable for the faithful's private adoration and prayer and which is organically connected to the church and readily visible to the Christian faithful. (GIRM 315)

The Missal does, however, direct that the tabernacle be situated "in a part of the church that is truly noble, prominent, readily visible, beautifully decorated, and suitable for prayer" (GIRM 314).

=== Evangelical-Lutheran ===
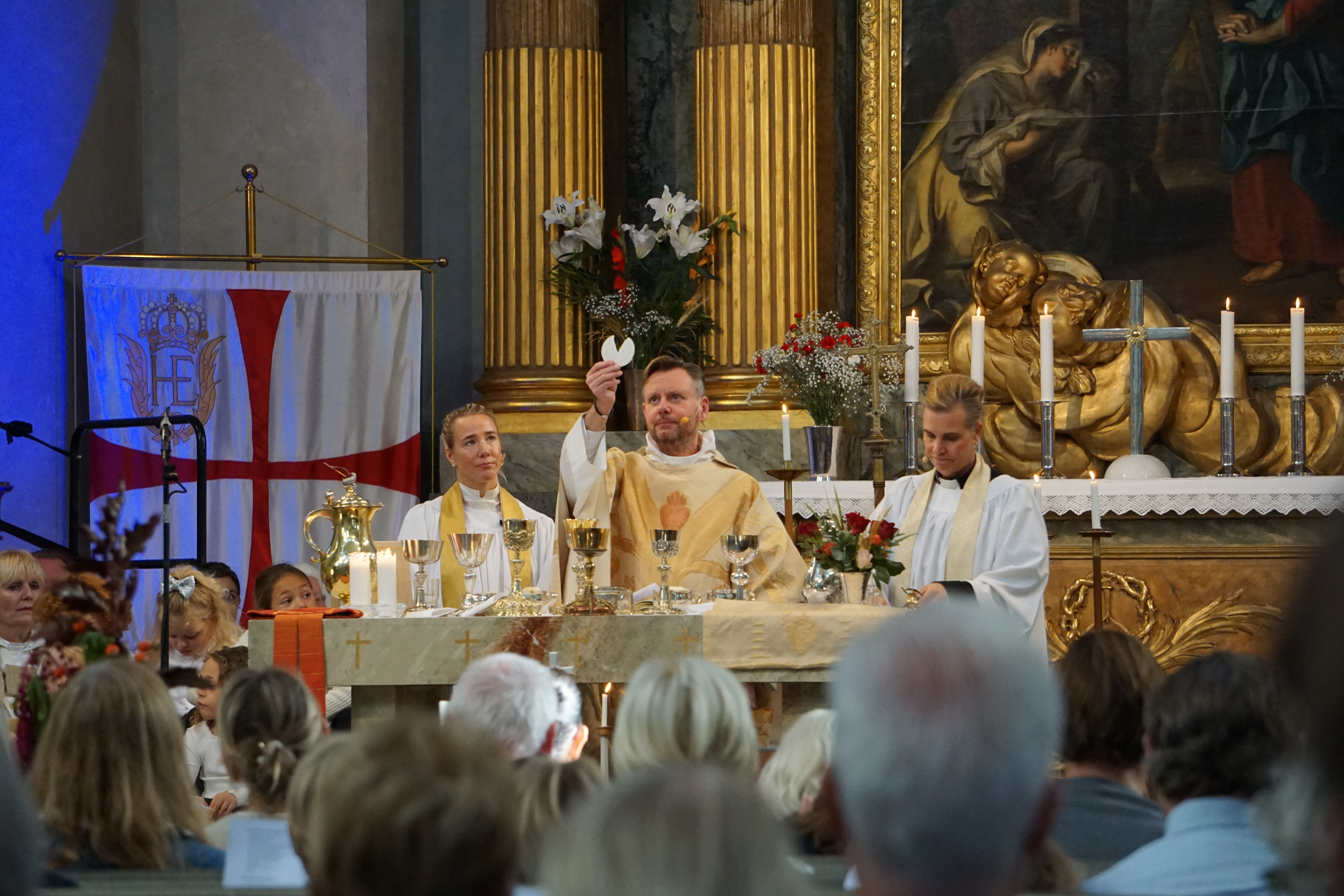
The elevation of the host during an Evangelical-Lutheran Mass celebrated versus populum.

In the Evangelical-Lutheran German Mass (Deutsche Messe), Martin Luther, the founder of that denomination, wrote that:

Here [in Wittenberg] we retain the vestments, altar, and candles until they are used up or we are pleased to make a change. But we do not oppose anyone who would do otherwise. In the true mass, however, of real Christians, the altar should not remain where it is, and the priest should always face the people as Christ doubtlessly did in the Last Supper.

Despite the words of Dr. Luther, there is no historical evidence of versus populum celebration in the centuries following the Reformation, or of freestanding altars. In contrast, most existing Lutheran churches retained their medieval altarpieces, and the altars of newly built churches typically featured an altar in a similar style, affixed to a reredos with paintings or sculptures. In discussing the celebration of the Mass (Divine Service) as found in the 2006 ELCA hymnal, Evangelical Lutheran Worship, Lorraine S. Brugh and Gordon W. Lathrop write "Many Lutherans, in concert with many other Christians, think that the time of which Luther spoke has indeed come, and that the pastor should preside at the table facing the people, i.e., versus populum. The assembly needs to have a sense that it is gathered around that table, sees and hears what happens there, has a promise of Christ clearly addressed to it, participates in the thanksgiving, and is made into a community through God's gift." Thus, in the ELCA, many altars are now built to be freestanding. In ELCA churches where the former altar attached to the wall cannot be moved, it has often been converted to be used as a credence table, as a "significant new table is set up, closer to the people and standing free".

Lutheran missals and liturgical books do not require the celebration of the Mass either versus populum or ad orientem, and the twenty-first century has seen a resurgence in the popularity of ad orientem celebration among Evangelical-Lutheran priests, most especially in congregations of the Lutheran Church–Missouri Synod, many of which have always retained their traditional ad orientem altars.

=== Anglican ===
For the majority of its history, ad orientem worship was the norm, apart from a relatively brief period following the Reformation when priests in the Church of England and other churches of the Anglican Communion celebrated the Holy Eucharist standing at the north-end (i.e. the left side) of the communion table, according to the rubric in the Book of Common Prayer. By the 1630s, Archbishop Laud's reforms had returned the altar to its traditional eastern position – there was an Elizabethan injunction on the matter, which Laud used to defend his requirement that the communion tables be stood permanently altar-wise at the east end. Thereafter followed a time of back-and-forth, but at the Restoration, altars in the Chapels Royal were restored to their proper positions, and many Cathedrals followed suit, although there was a notable disuniformity from church to church, with the non-conformists having differing views.

When the City of London churches were rebuilt following the great fire, there was a noticiable uniformity in the chancel layouts of the rebuilt churches, with the communion table stood on a marble floor, raised on one or two steps, railed and most backed by a reredos. The shallow depth of these steps meant that the communion table could only be placed altar-wise, that is, facing east in the traditional arrangement. It is thought that this is partly due to Wren being the son and nephew of distinguished Laudian churchmen, who would certainly have had the traditional ad orientem arrangement in their churches. This also applied to the city churches that survived the fire, such as St Helen, Bishopsgate, which retained its ad orientem orientation until the end of the 20th century. It is thought that celebrations from this period were at the "north end", the celebrant was actually facing east, while standing at the north end of the altar, as the altar arrangements leave little other space for the celebrant to stand. 18th Century Churches also follow suit, with similar altar arrangements to Wren's City Churches, with the baroque church of St Martin-in-the-Fields and the neighbouring Palladian church of St Giles-in-the-Fields both with railed altars at their east ends, preclude any arrangement of the altar other than the eastward position – the sanctuary of the latter (still largely in its original form) is so shallow that the swing of the communion rail gate does not even allow the communion table to be pulled away from the wall (the former has since been enlarged, with a modern stone altar positioned for versus populum celebration)

The rubric was further challenged in the 19th century by the Oxford Movement, many of whose leaders preferred the traditional ad orientem position, – indeed what is considered the "English Use" altar arrangement has curtains on 3 sides of the altar, only allowing the eastward celebration of the Eucharist. The practices reintroduced by the Anglo-Catholic revival soon became the norm throughout the Church of England, with most mainstream parish churches adopting, among other catholic practices, Eucharistic vestments, altar candlesticks and crucifixes, and most 19th century churches being constructed with ad orientem celebration in mind. Notable examples include the 19th century high altar at St Paul's Cathedral by Bodley and Garner constructed in marble with a large marble reredos, and the various Oxford Movement churches such as All Saints, Margaret Street and St Cyprian's, Clarence Gate by Comper, built to a Sarum Rite ideal. In America, the rubric requiring that the priest stand at the north end of the table, facing liturgical South, was removed from the 1928 American Book of Common Prayer (the Church of England never adopted the 1928 prayer book, as it was rejected by parliament). This was controversial, despite many notable 19th century Anglican churches and cathedrals in America had been built to Anglo-Catholic ideals, complete with stone eastward-facing altars and using full Eucharistic vestments, but nonetheless regularized a practice that was already widespread. Praying ad orientem then became common especially at the Gloria Patri, Gloria in Excelsis and Ecumenical creeds in that direction. However, following the reforms of the Second Vatican Council in the Roman Catholic Church, many mainstream Anglican churches that had re-adopted many of the traditional catholic practices, likewise adopted the reforms of Vatican II. "the course of the last forty years or so, a great many of those altars have either been removed and pulled out away from the wall or replaced by the kind of freestanding table-like altar", in "response to the popular sentiment that the priest ought not turn his back to the people during the service; the perception was that this represented an insult to the laity and their centrality in worship. Thus developed today's widespread practice in which the clergy stand behind the altar facing the people." Today, it is not uncommon to find ad orientem celebrations of the Eucharist in more traditional Anglican churches, but the reformed late 20th century Roman Catholic practice of versus populum is undoubtedly more widespread despite never being the historical norm.

=== Methodist ===
The United Methodist Book of Worship mandates that:

In our churches, the Communion table is to be placed in such a way that the presider is able to stand behind it, facing the people, and the people can visually if not physically gather around it. The table should be high enough so that the presider does not need to stoop to handle the bread and cup. Adaptations may be necessary to facilitate gracious leadership. While architectural integrity should be respected, it is important for churches to carefully adapt or renovate their worship spaces more fully to invite the people to participate in the Holy Meal. If altars are for all practical purposes immovable, then congregations should make provisions for creating a table suitable to the space so that the presiding minister may face the people and be closer to them.

== Disputation ==
Cardinal Joseph Ratzinger (later Pope Benedict XVI) in his book The Spirit of the Liturgy criticised the use of versus populum as ahistorical and even harmful to the liturgy. He stated that versus populum "turns the community into a self-enclosed circle", where the presider becomes the real point of reference instead of God. He also maintained that praying toward the east (ad orientem) is a tradition that goes back to the beginning of Christianity and that is a "fundamental expression of the Christian synthesis of cosmos and history" and urged Catholics to gradually return to this tradition. On the other hand, he warned against quick and frequent changes to the liturgy, so he proposed a temporary solution – placing the cross in the middle of the altar, so the entire congregation "turns toward the Lord", who should be the real center of the Mass.

Edward Slattery, from 1993 to 2016 Bishop of the Roman Catholic Diocese of Tulsa, argued that the change towards versus populum has had a number of unforeseen and largely negative effects. First of all, he said, "it is a serious rupture with the Church's ancient tradition. Secondly, it can give the appearance that the priest and the people were engaged in a conversation about God, rather than the worship of God. Thirdly, it places an inordinate importance on the personality of the celebrant by placing him on a kind of liturgical stage".

Evangelical-Lutheran priest Heath Curtis criticized the celebration of the Mass versus populum, noting: "Surely, when praying the celebrant should face the same direction as the people are facing: liturgical East, toward, you know, the One to Whom we are praying."

The Evangelical-Lutheran liturgist Charles L. McClean opined that "versus populum celebration [of the Mass] tends to make the celebrant a focus of attention in a way he never was in the ad orientem celebration".

On the other hand, the Jesuit theologian John Zupez, in an article in Emmanuel based on modern studies in scriptural exegesis, found that the New Testament word for sacrifice (hilasterion) refers to our expiation from sin, not propitiation impacting or appeasing God. This current translation, accepted in the Catholic lectionary, should "eliminate a strong argument for the priest at Mass facing toward God (ad orientem)" and "support the practice of the priest facing the people to elicit their active involvement." However, the Council of Trent had already authoritatively confirmed that "this sacrifice [of the Mass] is truly propitiatory."

== See also ==
- Ad orientem

== External list ==
- Media related to Versus populum altars at Wikimedia Commons
