= Ad orientem =

Eastward orientation in Christian worship

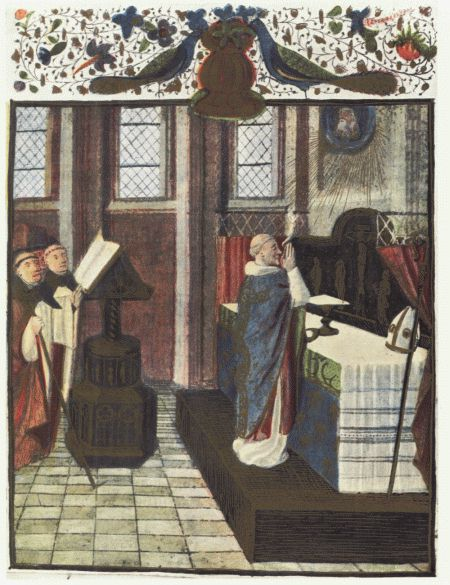
A 15th-century bishop celebrates Mass ad orientem, facing in the same direction as the people

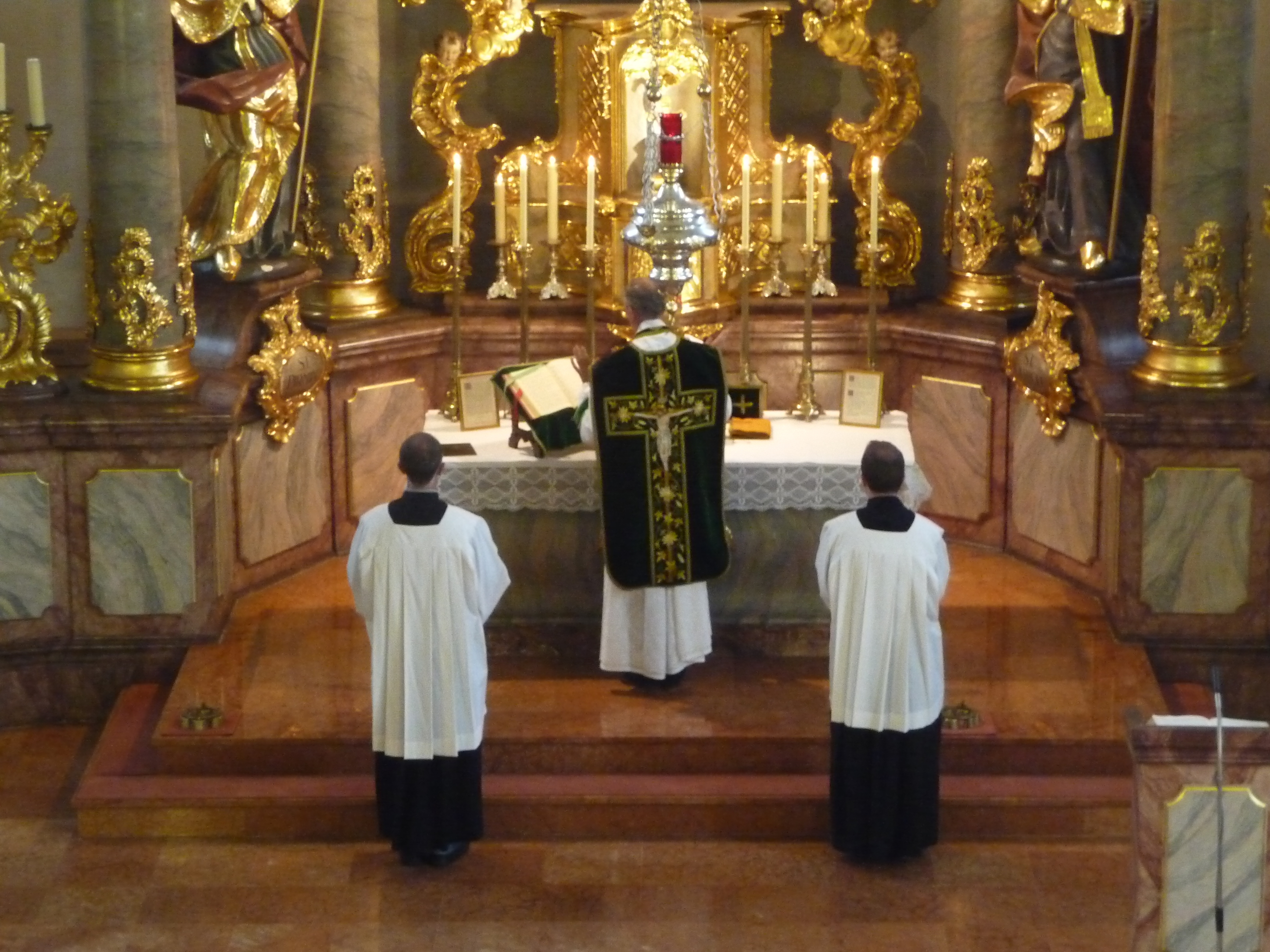
Tridentine Mass, celebrated regularly ad orientem

Ad orientem, meaning 'to the east' in Ecclesiastical Latin, is a phrase used to describe the eastward orientation of Christian prayer and Christian worship, comprising the preposition ad (toward) and oriens (rising, sunrise, east), participle of orior (to rise).

Ad orientem has been used to describe the eastward direction of prayer that the early Christians faced when praying, a practice that continues in the Eastern Orthodox Church, Oriental Orthodox churches, Mar Thoma Syrian Church, Assyrian Church of the East, as well as the Eastern Catholic and Eastern Lutheran churches. It was normative in the Roman Catholic Church until the 1960s, and remains so in the Tridentine Mass; some Lutheran and Anglican churches continue to offer their respective liturgies ad orientem. Although the Second Vatican Council never ordered any change from ad orientem to versus populum, a posture facing the people, in the aftermath of the council the change was nevertheless widespread and became the norm. Ad orientem was never forbidden, however: the Pauline Missal, indeed, presumes that Mass is said ad orientem in its rubrics, indicating that in the celebration of the Mass the priestly celebrant faces the altar with his back to the congregants, so that they all face in the same direction.

Since the time of the Early Church, the eastward direction of Christian prayer has carried a strong significance, attested by the writings of the Church Fathers. In the 2nd century, Syrian Christians hung a Christian cross on the eastern wall of their houses, symbolizing "their souls facing God, talking with him, and sharing their spirituality with the Lord". Two centuries later, Saint Basil the Great declared that "facing the east to pray was among the oldest unwritten laws of the Church". Nearly all Christian apologetic tracts published in the 7th century in the Syriac and Arabic languages explained that Christians prayed facing the east because "the Garden of Eden was planted in the east (Genesis 2:8) and ... at the end of time, at the second coming, the Messiah would approach Jerusalem from the east."

Parishes of the Coptic Church, a church of Oriental Orthodox Christianity, are designed to face east and efforts are made to remodel churches obtained from other Christian denominations that are not built in this fashion.

== Christian prayer facing east ==
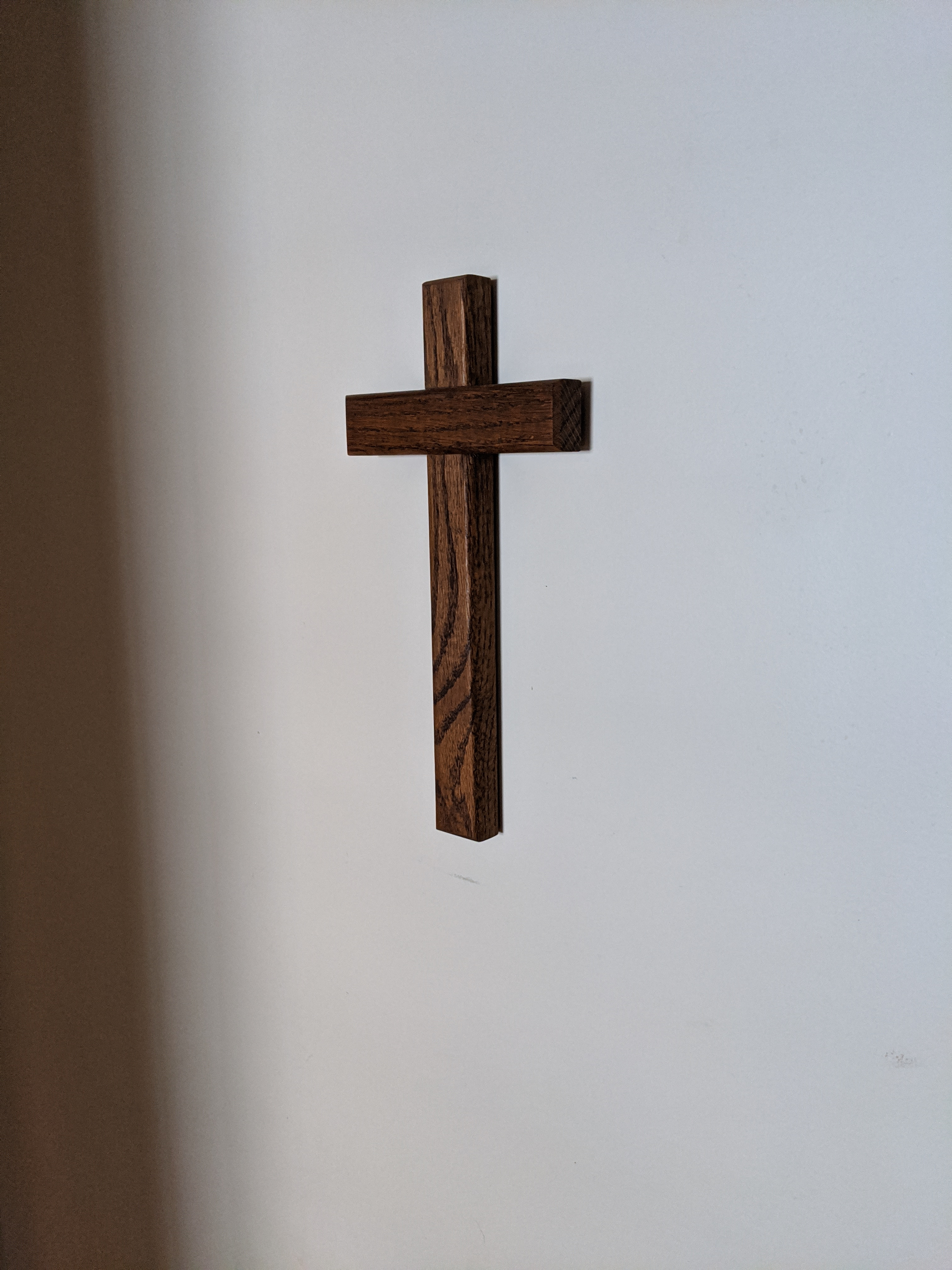
A Christian cross hanging on the eastern wall of a modern house, indicating the eastward direction towards which prayer is focused

In the time of the early Church, the eastward direction of Christian prayer was the standard and carried a strong significance, attested by the writings of the Church Fathers.

=== Origins of the practice ===
The eastward direction of prayer among early Christians is a custom inherited from the Jews. At the time of the formation of Christianity, Jews commonly prayed not only towards the Temple of Solomon, where the presence of the transcendent God (shekinah) [resided] in the Holy of Holies of the Temple, but also toward the east, although to what extent this practice was widespread is disputed. After the Temple was destroyed, synagogical liturgy continued the practice of praying in that direction, "inseparably bound up with the messianic expectation of Israel." Some rabbinic traditions encouraged Jews to construct synagogues with their entrances facing east, in imitation of the Temple of Jerusalem following its destruction, although this guideline was only sporadically implemented in practice. It was the practice, Paul F. Bradshaw says, of the Jewish sects of the Essenes and the Therapeutae, for whom "the eastward prayer had acquired an eschatological dimension, the 'fine bright day' for which the Therapeutae prayed being apparently the messianic age and the Essene prayer towards the sun 'as though beseeching him to rise' being a petition for the coming of the priestly Messiah." Eventually, a "process of mutual stimulus and disaffection" between Jews and early Christians seems to have brought about the end of Jewish prayer towards the east, and Christian prayer towards Jerusalem. The Islamic practice of praying initially towards Jerusalem, as well as the concept of praying in a certain direction, is derived from the Jewish practice, which was ubiquitous among the Jewish communities of Syria, Palestine, Yathrib and Yemen.

Additionally, the Christian custom of praying towards the east may have roots in the practice of the earliest Christians in Jerusalem of praying towards the Mount of Olives, to the east of the city, which they saw as the locus of key eschatological events and especially of the awaited Second Coming of Christ. Although the localization of the Second Coming on the Mount of Olives was abandoned after the destruction of Jerusalem in AD 70, the eastward direction of Christian prayer was retained and became general throughout Christendom.

=== Early Christianity ===
Early Christians, who were largely persecuted, usually worshipped in house churches, and the Eucharist was never exposed to non-Christians. The church-hall, according to the evidence found at Dura-Europos, was oblong, with the people facing the eastern wall, where there was a platform where the table-altar of the Eucharist was offered by the presbyter/priest, who also apparently faced east. Images of biblical scenes and figures, including that of Christ, adorned the walls, including the eastern wall. In the 2nd century, Syrian Christians indicated the direction in which to pray by placing a cross on the eastern wall of their house or church, a direction that symbolized "their souls facing God, talking with him, and sharing their spirituality with the Lord." Believers turned towards it to pray at fixed prayer times, such as in the morning, evening and other parts of the day; this practice continues among some Christians today, along with the related custom of Christian families erecting their home altar or icon corner on the east wall of their dwellings.

Among the early Church Fathers, Tertullian used the equivalent phrase ad orientis regionem (to the region of the east) in his Apologeticus (A.D. 197). Clement of Alexandria (c. 150 – c. 215) says: "Since the dawn is an image of the day of birth, and from that point the light which has shone forth at first from the darkness increases, there has also dawned on those involved in darkness a day of the knowledge of truth. In correspondence with the manner of the sun's rising, prayers are made looking towards the sunrise in the east." Origen (c. 185–253) says: "The fact that [...] of all the quarters of the heavens, the east is the only direction we turn to when we pour out prayer, the reasons for this, I think, are not easily discovered by anyone." Origen "firmly rejects the argument that if a house has a fine view in a different direction, one should face that way rather than towards the east."

In the fourth century, Saint Basil the Great declared that one of the many beliefs and practices that Christians derived not from written teaching but by the tradition of the apostles was to turn to the East when praying. Using the phrase ad orientem, Augustine of Hippo mentioned the practice at the end of the fourth century.

Syriac and Arabic Christian apologetics of the 7th century explained that Christians prayed facing east because "the Garden of Eden was planted in the east (Genesis 2:8) and that at the end of time, at the second coming, the Messiah would approach Jerusalem from the east." Saint John of Damascus taught that believers pray facing east because it "reminds Christians of their need to long for and strive for the paradise that God intended for them" and because "Christians affirm their faith in Christ as the Light of the world" by praying in the direction of sunrise.

=== Later ecclesiastics ===
In the eighth century, Saint John of Damascus, a Doctor of the Church, wrote:

It is not without reason or by chance that we worship towards the East. But seeing that we are composed of a visible and an invisible nature, that is to say, of a nature partly of spirit and partly of sense, we render also a twofold worship to the Creator; just as we sing both with our spirit and our bodily lips, and are baptized with both water and Spirit, and are united with the Lord in a twofold manner, being sharers in the Mysteries and in the grace of the Spirit. Since, therefore, God is spiritual light, and Christ is called in the Scriptures Sun of Righteousness and Dayspring, the East is the direction that must be assigned to His worship. For everything good must be assigned to Him from Whom every good thing arises. Indeed the divine David also says, Sing unto God, ye kingdoms of the earth: O sing praises unto the Lord: to Him that rideth upon the Heavens of heavens towards the East. Moreover the Scripture also says, And God planted a garden eastward in Eden; and there He put the man whom He had formed: and when he had transgressed His command He expelled him and made him to dwell over against the delights of Paradise, which clearly is the West. So, then, we worship God seeking and striving after our old fatherland. Moreover the tent of Moses had its veil and mercy seat towards the East. Also the tribe of Judah as the most precious pitched their camp on the East. Also in the celebrated temple of Solomon, the Gate of the Lord was placed eastward. Moreover Christ, when He hung on the Cross, had His face turned towards the West, and so we worship, striving after Him. And when He was received again into Heaven He was borne towards the East, and thus His apostles worship Him, and thus He will come again in the way in which they beheld Him going towards Heaven; as the Lord Himself said, As the lightning cometh out of the East and shineth even unto the West, so also shall the coming of the Son of Man be. So, then, in expectation of His coming we worship towards the East. But this tradition of the apostles is unwritten. For much that has been handed down to us by tradition is unwritten.

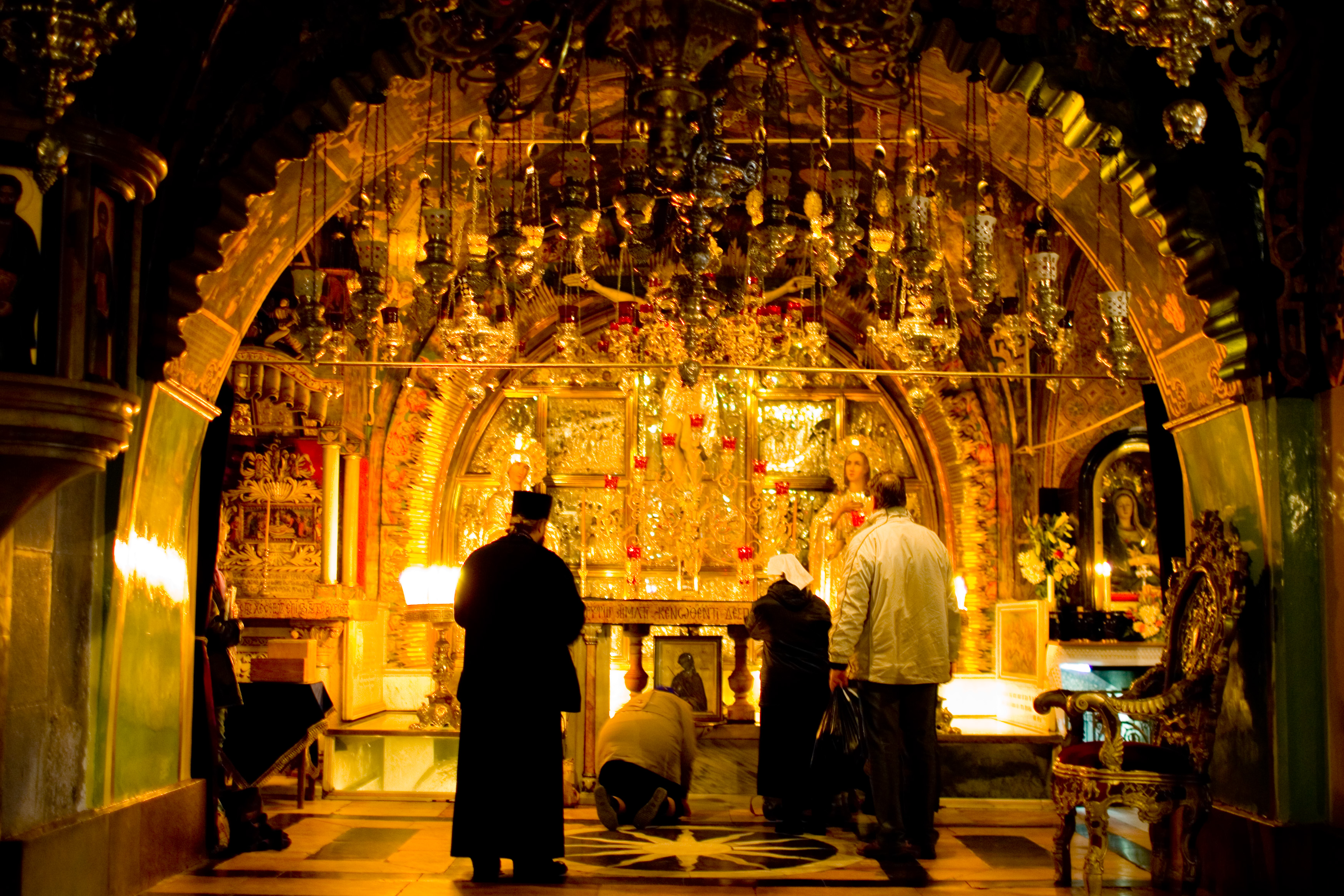
Eastern Orthodox Christian pilgrims making prostrations at Golgotha in the Church of the Holy Sepulchre, Jerusalem

Timothy I, an eighth-century patriarch of the Church of the East declared:

He [Christ] has taught us all the economy of the Christian religion: baptism, laws, ordinances, prayers, worship in the direction of the east, and the sacrifice that we offer. All these things He practiced in His person and taught us to practise ourselves.

Moses Bar-Kepha, a ninth-century bishop of the Syriac Orthodox Church called praying towards the east one of the mysteries of the Church.

Cardinal Joseph Ratzinger, who later became Pope Benedict XVI, described the eastward orientation as linked with the "cosmic sign of the rising sun which symbolizes the universality of God." He also states in the same book (The Spirit of the Liturgy) that:

Despite all the variations in practice that have taken place far into the second millennium, one thing has remained clear for the whole of Christendom: praying toward the east is a tradition that goes back to the beginning. Moreover, it is a fundamental expression of the Christian synthesis of cosmos and history, of being rooted in the once-for-all events again.

=== Present-day practice ===
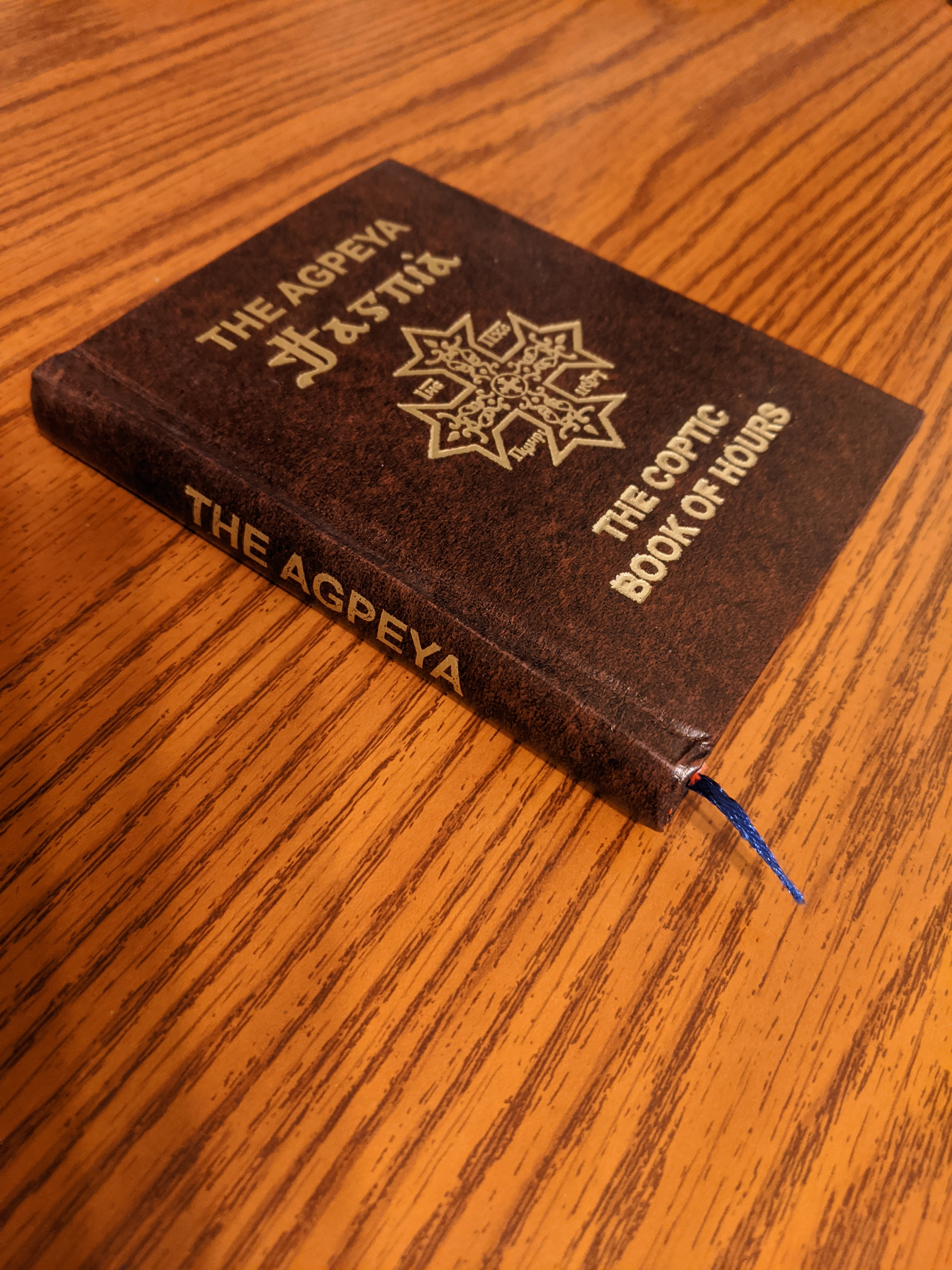
The Agpeya is a breviary used in Oriental Orthodox Christianity to pray the canonical hours at fixed prayer times during the day, usually in an eastward direction.

Members of Oriental Orthodox Churches, such as those belonging to the Indian Orthodox Church, Syriac Orthodox Church, Ethiopian Orthodox Tewahedo Church and Coptic Orthodox Church, as well as Oriental Protestant Churches such as the Mar Thoma Syrian Church, pray privately in their homes in the eastward direction of prayer at seven fixed prayer times; when a priest visits a home, he asks the family where the east is before leading them in prayer. Indian Christians and Coptic Christians in these traditions, for example, pray daily in private the canonical hours contained in the Shehimo and Agpeya, respectively (a practice done at fixed prayer times seven instances a day) facing the eastward direction.

Eastern Orthodox Christians, as well as members of the Church of the East, also face east when praying.

Members of the Pentecostal Apostolic Faith Mission continue to pray facing east, believing that it "is the direction from which Jesus Christ will come when he returns".

== Liturgical orientation ==
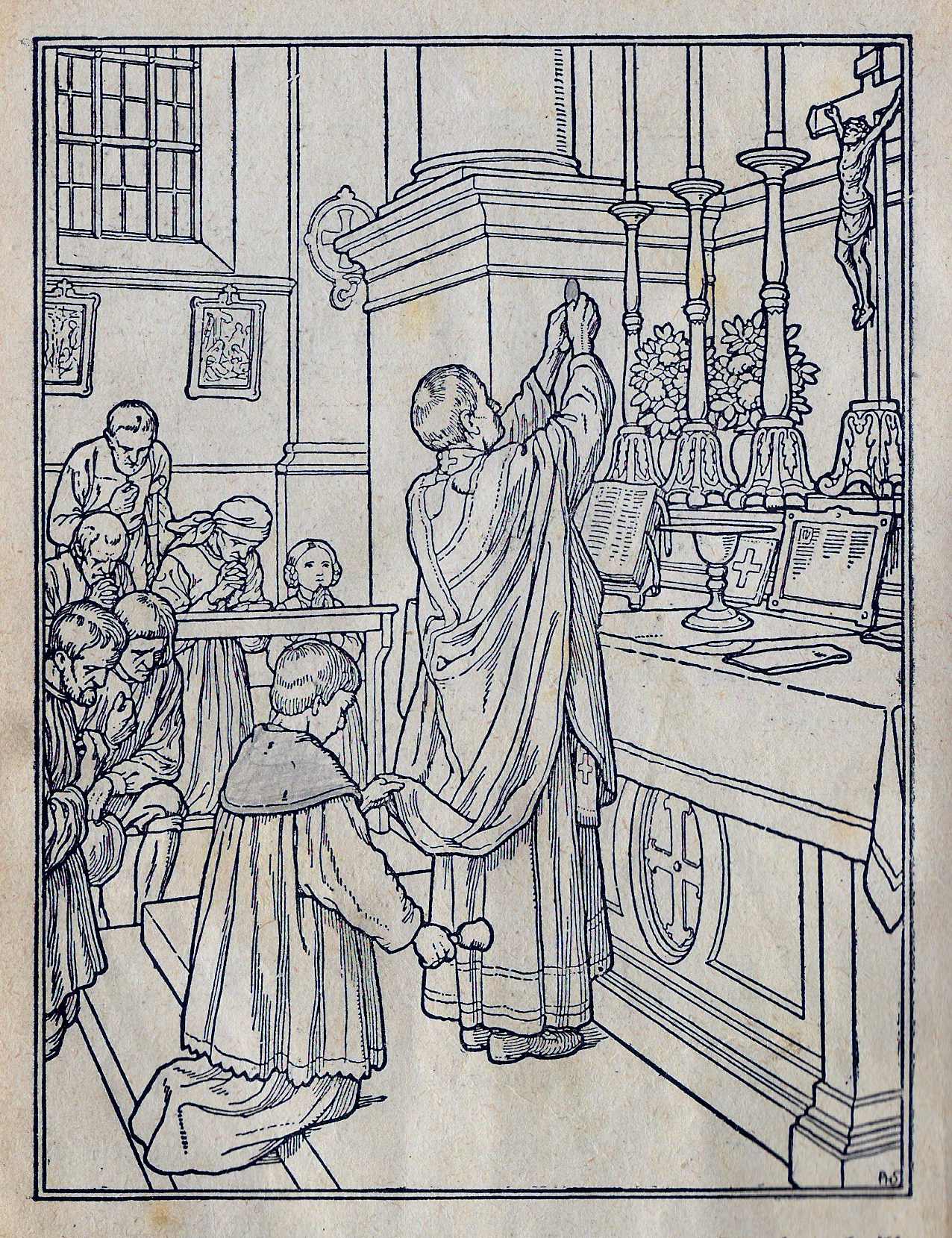
Catholic priest at an altar attached to a wall

The Ecclesiastical Latin phrase ad orientem is commonly used today to describe a particular posture of a priest in Christian liturgy: facing away from the people towards the apse or reredos or wall behind the altar, with priest and people looking in the same direction, as opposed to the versus populum orientation in which the priest faces the congregation. In this use, the phrase is not necessarily related to the geographical direction in which the priest is looking and is employed even if he is not facing to the east or even has his back to the east.

In the Tridentine Roman Missal published in 1570, however, ad orientem and versus populum are not mutually exclusive. The altar may indeed be versus populum (facing the people), but even in this case it is assumed to be ad orientem (towards the East): "Si altare sit ad orientem, versus populum, celebrans versa facie ad populum, non vertit humeros ad altare, cum dicturus est Dóminus vobiscum, Oráte, fratres, Ite, missa est, vel daturus benedictionem ..." (If the altar is ad orientem, towards the people, the celebrant, facing the people, does not turn his back to the altar when about to say Dominus vobiscum ["The Lord be with you"], Orate, fratres [the introduction to the prayer over the offerings of bread and wine], and Ite, missa est [the dismissal at the conclusion of the Mass], or about to give the blessing ...). The wording remained unchanged in all later editions of the Tridentine Missal, even the last, which is still in use today.

=== History ===
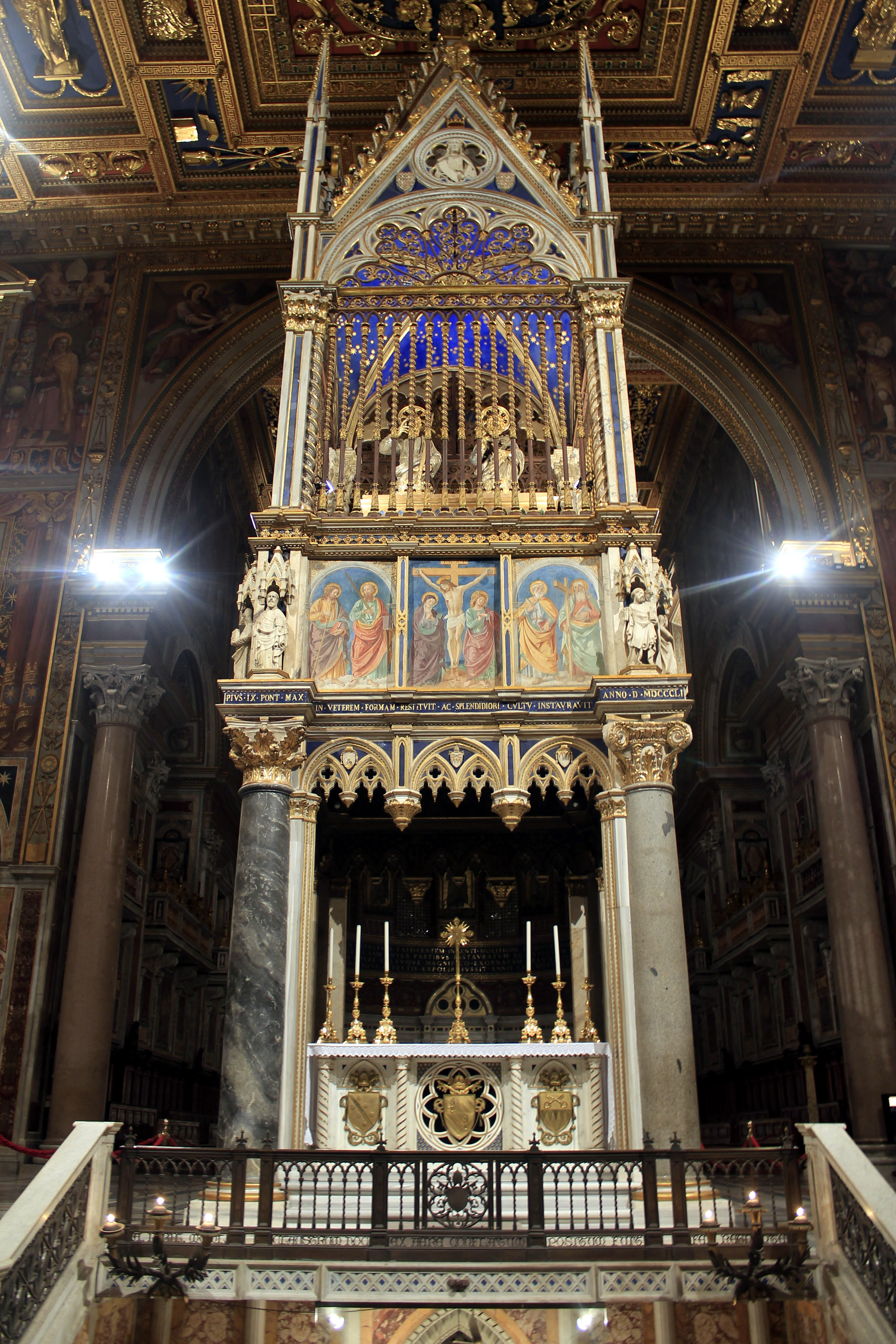
The altar of the cathedral of Rome, at which popes have always celebrated Mass facing east and also facing the people

Most early churches were built with their apse facing the east, with the exceptions mainly occurring in Rome and North Africa after the legalization of Christianity; the orientation of buildings in Rome used for Christian liturgy before the end of persecution is not known. The earliest churches in Rome had a façade to the east and an apse with the altar to the west; the priest celebrating Mass stood behind the altar, facing east and so towards the people.

According to Louis Bouyer, not only the priest but also the congregation faced east at prayer. Michel Remery critiques Bouyer's view on the grounds of the unlikelihood that, in those churches where the altar was to the west, Christians would turn their backs on the altar (and the priest) at the celebration of the Eucharist. According to Remery, the view prevails that the priest, facing east, would celebrate ad populum in some churches, in others not, in accordance with the churches' architecture. The official journal of the Congregation for Divine Worship and the Discipline of the Sacraments Notitiae also commented in its May 1993 issue on the unlikelihood that the people would turn their backs on the altar so as to face east; and it recalled the reproaches of Pope Leo I against those who on entering Saint Peter's Basilica would turn round to face the rising sun and bow their heads to it. Lang and Gamber argue that in churches with a westward apse, the people did not face either towards or away from the altar, but rather stood in the side aisles facing the opposite side aisle, which allowed them to see both the altar and the East. The central aisle would have been left empty for processions. This thesis is supported by indications that early Christians conventionally prayed both eastward and towards open doors or windows, and churches were segregated with women on one side and men on the other.

Outside of Rome, it was an ancient custom for most churches to be built with the entrance at the west end and for priest and people to face eastward to the place of the rising sun. Among the exceptions was the original Constantinian Church of the Holy Sepulchre in Jerusalem, which had the altar in the west end.

After the Edict of Milan legitimized the building of Christian churches, the practice of praying towards the east did not result in uniformity in their orientation. By the reign of Emperor Justinian, churches in the Eastern Roman Empire were consistently oriented with the apse on the eastern side, and under his rule, North African churches were also remodeled to have the apse on the eastern side.

In 386, the Theodosian Basilica of St. Paul was built in Rome with the apse on the eastern side, which later became common practice. In the 8th or 9th century, the position whereby the priest faced the apse, not the people, when celebrating Mass was increasingly adopted in the Roman rite. The Ordo Romanus I, dating to the early 700s, mentions the Pope turning to face the people to intone the Gloria and then immediately turning back to face east, implying that the rubric was written for a church with an eastward apse. This usage was introduced from the Frankish Empire and later became almost universal in the West. Some new churches in Francia such as St. Gall, influenced by Roman basilicas, also adopted the westward-facing apse, although this tendency was short-lived. However, the Tridentine Roman Missal continued to recognize the possibility of celebrating Mass "versus populum" (facing the people), and in several churches in Rome, it was physically impossible, even before the twentieth-century liturgical reforms, for the priest to celebrate Mass facing away from the people because of the presence, immediately in front of the altar, of the "confession" (Latin: confessio), an area sunk below floor level to enable people to come close to the tomb of the saint buried beneath the altar.

Anglican Bishop Colin Buchanan argues that there "is reason to think that in the first millennium of the church in Western Europe, the president of the eucharist regularly faced across the eucharistic table toward the ecclesiastical west. Somewhere between the 10th and 12th centuries, a change occurred in which the table itself was moved to be fixed against the east wall, and the president stood before it, facing east, with his back to the people." This change, according to Buchanan, "was possibly precipitated by the coming of tabernacles for reservation, which were ideally both to occupy a central position and also to be fixed to the east wall without the president turning his back to them."

There is a common belief that in 7th century England, Latin Catholic churches were built so that on the very feast day of the saint in whose honor they were named, Mass could be offered on an altar while directly facing the rising sun. However, various surveys of old English churches found no evidence of any such general practice.

=== Roman Catholic liturgy ===
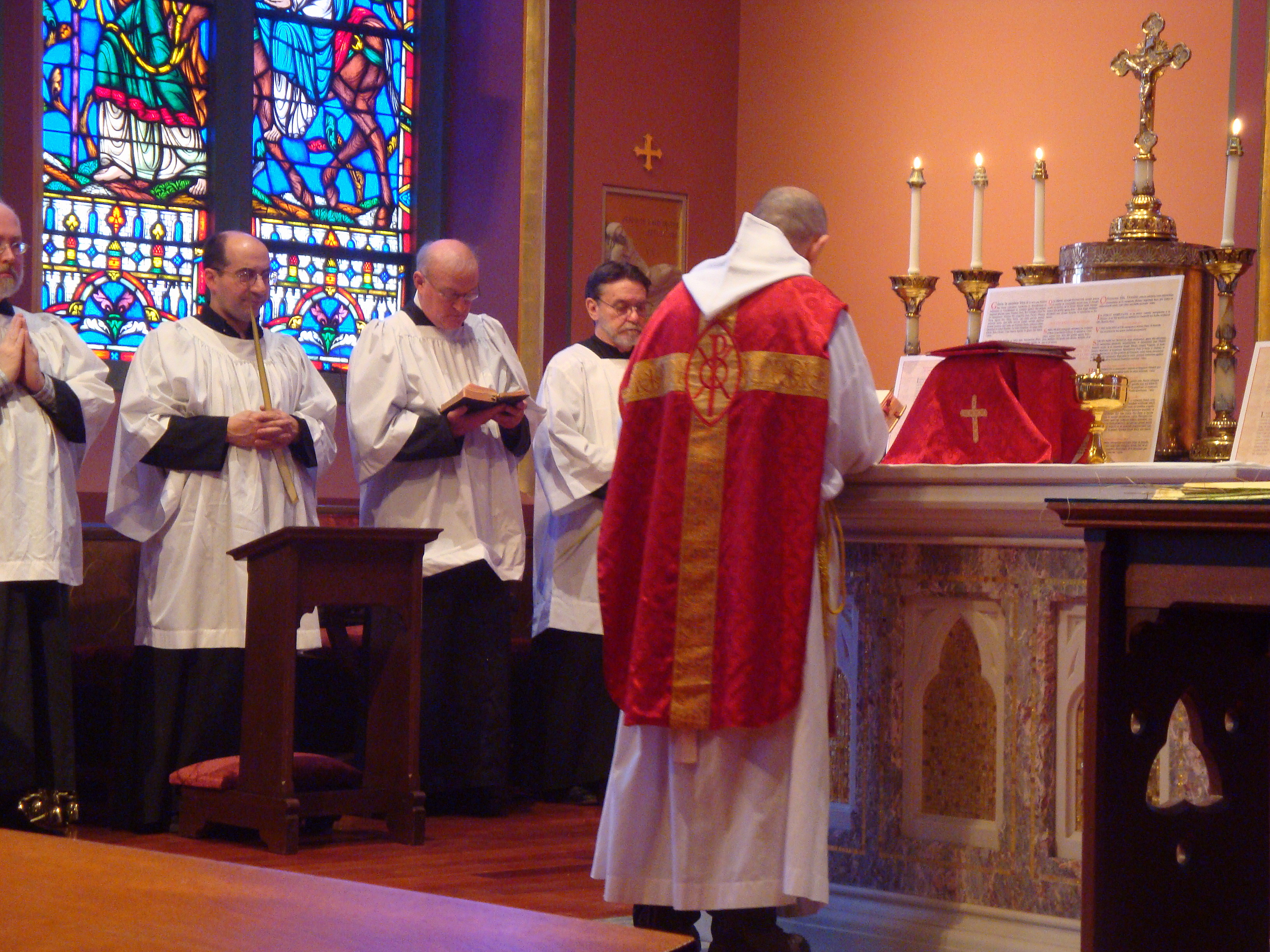
A Palm Sunday Low Mass celebrated ad orientem (not necessarily in the geographical sense) in 2009

The present Roman Missal of the Catholic Church (revised in 1969 following the Second Vatican Council) does not forbid the ad orientem position of the priest saying Mass: its General Instruction only requires that in new or renovated churches the facing-the-people orientation be made possible: "The altar should be built separate from the wall, in such a way that it is possible to walk around it easily and that Mass can be celebrated at it facing the people, which is desirable wherever possible." As in some ancient churches the ad orientem position was physically impossible, so today there are churches and chapels in which it is physically impossible for the priest to face the people throughout the Mass.

A letter of 25 September 2000 from the Congregation for Divine Worship and the Discipline of the Sacraments in the Roman Catholic Church treats the phrase "which is desirable wherever possible" as referring to the requirement that altars be built separate from the wall, not to the celebration of Mass facing the people, while "it reaffirms that the position toward the assembly seems more convenient inasmuch as it makes communication easier ... without excluding, however, the other possibility." This is also what is stated in the original text (in Latin) of the General Instruction of the Roman Missal (2002), which reads, "Altare maius exstruatur a pariete seiunctum, ut facile circumiri et in eo celebratio versus populum peragi possit, quod expedit ubicumque possibile sit." As quod is a neuter pronoun, it cannot refer back to the feminine celebratio [versus populum] and mean that celebration facing the people expedit ubicumque possible sit ("is desirable wherever possible"), but must refer to the entirety of the preceding phrase about building the altar separate from the wall so to facilitate walking around it and celebrating Mass at it while facing the people.

On 13 January 2008, Pope Benedict XVI of the Catholic Church publicly celebrated Mass in the Sistine Chapel at its altar, which is attached to the west wall. He later celebrated Mass at the same altar in the Sistine Chapel annually for the Feast of the Baptism of the Lord. His celebration of Mass in the Pauline Chapel in the Apostolic Palace on 1 December 2009 was reported to be the first time he publicly celebrated Mass ad orientem on a freestanding altar. In reality, earlier that year the chapel had been remodeled, with "the previous altar back in its place, although still a short distance from the tabernacle, restoring the celebration of all 'facing the Lord'." On 15 April 2010 he again celebrated Mass in the same way in the same chapel and with the same group. The practice of saying Mass at the altar attached to the west wall of the Sistine Chapel on the Feast of the Baptism of the Lord was continued by Pope Francis, when he celebrated the feast for the first time as Supreme Pontiff on 12 January 2014. Although neither before nor after the 20th-century revision of the Roman Rite did liturgical norms impose either orientation, the distinction became so linked with traditionalist discussion that it was considered journalistically worthy of remark that Pope Francis celebrated Mass ad orientem at an altar at which only this orientation was possible.

In a conference in London on 5 July 2016, Cardinal Robert Sarah, Prefect of the Congregation for Divine Worship and the Discipline of the Sacraments in the Catholic Church, encouraged priests to adopt the ad orientem position from the first Sunday in Advent at the end of that year. However, the Vatican soon clarified that this was a personal view of the cardinal and that no official directives would be issued to change the prevailing practice of celebrating versus populum.

=== Oriental Orthodox liturgy ===
In Oriental Orthodox Christianity, the liturgy of the Coptic and Ethiopian rites exhort believers with the words "Look towards the East!" All churches of the Coptic Orthodox Church are designed to face east and efforts are made to remodel churches obtained from other Christian denominations that are not built in this fashion.

=== Eastern Orthodox liturgy ===
The Eastern Orthodox Church normally celebrates the Divine Liturgy facing eastward. Only in very exceptional circumstances does it do so versus populum.

=== Lutheran liturgy ===
Traditionally, in the Lutheran Churches, the Divine Service "is oriented to the East from which the Sun of Righteousness will return". Though some parishes now celebrate the Mass versus populum, the traditional liturgical posture of ad orientem is retained by many Lutheran churches.

Among Eastern Lutheran churches that celebrate the Byzantine Rite, the eastward position is universally practiced.

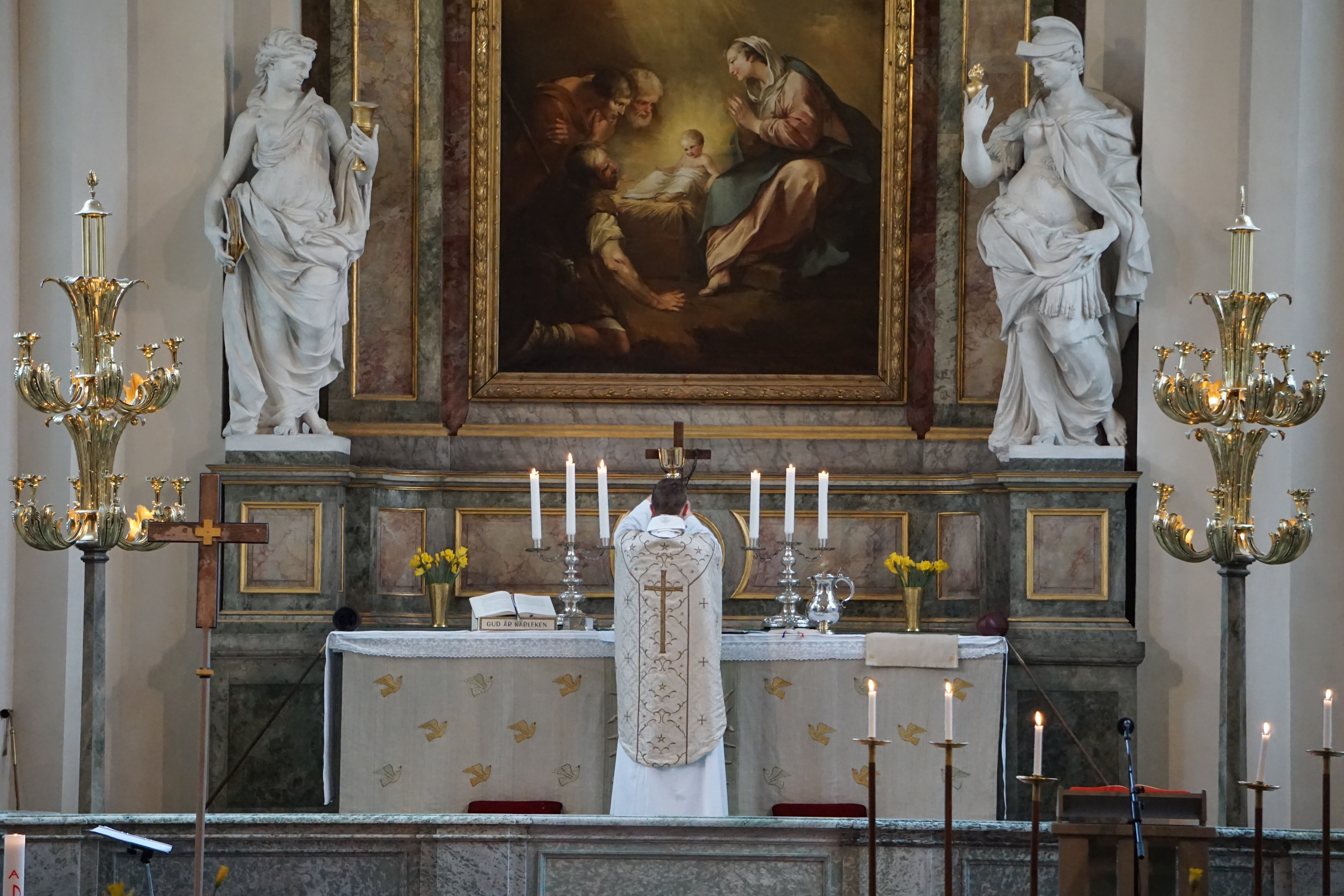
A Lutheran priest in the Church of Sweden elevating the host during a mass performed ad orientem. Although the Church of Sweden missal/handbook doesn't prescribe one way or another, the prevailing norm since around the 1970s has been versus populum. Ad orientem does still occur however, especially in older churches constructed with fixed altars in the choir.

=== Anglican liturgy ===
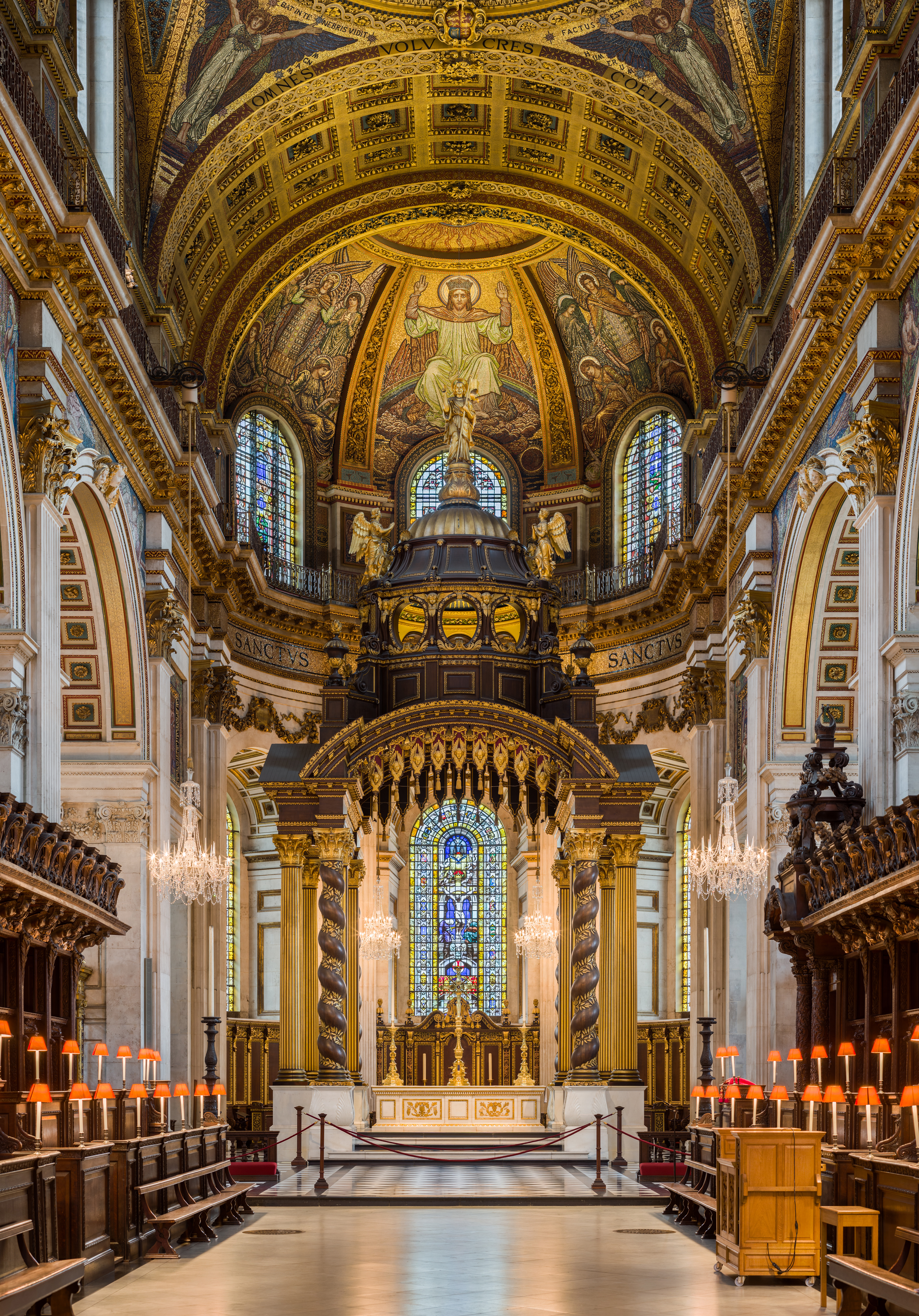
An ad orientem altar in an Anglican cathedral

The English expression "eastward position", which reflects the continuance in England of the traditional orientation abandoned elsewhere in the West, normally means not only "east-facing" but also unambiguously "the position of the celebrant of the Eucharist standing on the same side of the altar as the people, with his back to them". The opposite arrangement is likewise unambiguously called the "westward position". Those who use the phrase "ad orientem" refrain from using the correspondingly ambiguous "ad occidentem" phrase and speak of that arrangement instead as "versus populum".

With the English Reformation, the Church of England directed that the sacrament of the Holy Eucharist be celebrated at a communion table placed lengthwise in the chancel or in the body of the church, with the priest standing on the north side of the holy table, facing south. Turning to the east continued to be observed at certain points of the Anglican liturgy, including the saying of the Gloria Patri, Gloria in excelsis Deo and ecumenical creeds in that direction. Archbishop Laud, under direction from Charles I of England, encouraged a return to the use of the altar at the east end, but in obedience to the rubric in the Book of Common Prayer the priest stood at the north end of the altar. In the middle of the 19th century, the Oxford Movement gave rise to a return to the eastward-facing position, and use of the versus populum position appeared in the second half of the 20th century.

In the time when Archibald Campbell Tait was Archbishop of Canterbury (1868–1882), the eastward position, introduced by the Oxford Movement, was the object of violent controversy, leading to its outlawing by the Parliament of the United Kingdom in the Public Worship Regulation Act 1874. In their pastoral letter of 1 March 1875, the Archbishops and Bishops of the Church of England lamented "the growing tendency to associate doctrinal significance with rites and ceremonies which do not necessarily involve it. For example, the position to be occupied by the minister during the prayer of consecration in the Holy Communion' [...] We, the clergy, are bound by every consideration to obey the law when thus clearly interpreted [...]".

In spite of the legal prohibition, adoption of the eastward position became normal in the succeeding decades in most provinces of the Anglican Church with the exception of the Church of Ireland. Then, from the 1960s onward, the westward position largely replaced both eastward position and north side and, in the view of Colin Buchanan, "has proved a reconciling force within Anglican usage".

"Over the course of the last forty years or so, a great many of those altars have either been removed and pulled out away from the wall or replaced by the kind of freestanding table-like altar", in "response to the popular sentiment that the priest ought not turn his back to the people during the service; the perception was that this represented an insult to the laity and their centrality in worship. Thus developed today's widespread practice in which the clergy stand behind the altar facing the people."

=== Methodist liturgy ===
The post-1992 United Methodist rubrics stated:

In our churches, the Communion table is to be placed in such a way that the presider is able to stand behind it, facing the people, and the people can visually if not physically gather around it. The table should be high enough so that the presider does not need to stoop to handle the bread and cup. Adaptations may be necessary to facilitate gracious leadership. While architectural integrity should be respected, it is important for churches to carefully adapt or renovate their worship spaces more fully to invite the people to participate in the Holy Meal. If altars are for all practical purposes immovable, then congregations should make provisions for creating a table suitable to the space so that the presiding minister may face the people and be closer to them.

== See also ==
- Christian influences in Islam
- Canonical hours
- Direction of prayer
  - Mizrah, the direction of prayer in the Jewish faith
  - Qibla, the Muslim direction of prayer
  - Qiblih, the Baháʼí direction of prayer
- Fixed prayer times
- Orientation of churches
- Spatial deixis, spatial orientation relevant to an utterance
- Versus populum, orientation of priests facing the congregation
