= Introduction to Christianity =

1968 book by Joseph Ratzinger

- Book cover
- Author: Joseph Ratzinger (Pope Benedict XVI)
- Original title: Einführung in das Christentum
- Translator: J. R. Foster
- Cover artist: Riz Boncan Marsella
- Language: English
- Subjects: Christology; Theology
- Publisher: Ignatius Press
- Publication date: 1968
- Publication place: United States
- Media type: Print
- Pages: 300
- ISBN: 978-1-58617-029-5

Introduction to Christianity (German: Einführung in das Christentum) is a 1968 book written by Joseph Ratzinger (Pope Benedict XVI). Considered one of his most important and widely read books, it presents a "narrative Christology" that demonstrates the place for faith is in the Church. The book offers a "remarkable elucidation of the Apostle's Creed" and gives an "excellent, modern interpretation of the foundations of Christianity".

== Overview ==
Originally published in German in 1968 under the title Einführung in das Christentum, Ratzinger restates the Apostles' Creed and the meaning of this foundational text in language that has a greater contemporary resonance than the Creed itself. (Note: The Apostles' Creed was based on Christian theological understanding of the Canonical gospels, the letters of the New Testament, and to a lesser extent the Old Testament. Its basis appears to be the old Roman Creed. The name of the Creed may come from the fifth-century tradition that, under the inspiration of the Holy Spirit after Pentecost, each of the Twelve Apostles dictated part of it. It is traditionally divided into twelve articles. Saint Ambrose referred to the "Creed of the Apostles" in AD 390.) Like the Apostles' Creed, the book presents the doctrines pertaining to the Father, the Son, and the Spirit in sequence.

The book lays the foundations for a new kind of theological exegesis of the Bible, based on the document Dei verbum of the Second Vatican Council (1962-1965), co-authored by Joseph Ratzinger, which combines two quite different ways of hermeneutics, the interpretation of faith and historical-critical interpretation. This exegesis of the Bible is fully developed in his book Jesus of Nazareth, published in two volumes as Pope in 2007 and 2011, some of whose ideas are rooted in Introduction to Christianity.

== Editions ==
The English edition of Introduction to Christianity was revised in 2000 by Ignatius Press with a new preface by Joseph Ratzinger. A second revised edition was released in 2004 by Ignatius Press.

== Reception ==
The book started in 1968 with a print run of 4500 copies, and by 1969 45,000 copies had been sold.

The Protestant theologian Helmut Gollwitzer wrote in his preface to the German paperback edition of Introduction to Christianity: "Ratzinger's book is a document of the stormy ecumenical breaking down of old barriers. ... The reader, wherever he may stand himself, is made to understand how Christian faith presents itself under the spiritual conditions of our time, what faith is in the biblical sense."
