= Aramaic Sources of Mark's Gospel =

1998 book by Maurice Casey

- Author: Maurice Casey
- Language: English
- Publisher: Cambridge University Press
- Publication date: 1998
- Media type: Print, Kindle
- Pages: 278
- ISBN: 978-0521633147

Aramaic Sources of Mark's Gospel is a book by Maurice Casey, who is a reader in early Jewish and Christian studies at the University of Nottingham. Casey takes four passages from the Book of Mark and reconstructs what an original written Aramaic source would have said if the Book of Mark was a translation of that source.

== Content ==
Chapter 1 is a review of prior investigations of the Aramaic substratum of the Gospels.

Chapter 2 describes Casey's methodology for reconstructing the possible Aramaic sources behind the synoptic Gospels. In particular, he relies on the written Aramaic found in the contemporaneous Dead Sea Scrolls.

Chapters 3 to 6 show his reconstruction of four Marcan passages:

1. Jesus' scriptural understanding of John the Baptist's death in Mark 9:11-13;
2. Two Sabbath controversies in Mark 2:23-3:6;
3. The question of Jacob [= James] and John in Mark 10:35-45; and
4. Jesus' final Passover with his disciples in Mark 14:12-26

Chapter 7 shows his arguments for dating the putative written Aramaic source for Mark to around 40 C.E.

== Academic reviews ==
- Joseph Fitzmyer, S. A. of the Catholic University of America generally agreed with Casey's approach.
- Bruce Chilton of Bard College generally agrees with the central contention of the book.
- James H. Charlesworth of Princeton Theological Seminary felt that "Casey’s method is an improvement over earlier work" but that "one still is frustrated by the paucity of evidence on how Aramaic was being rendered into Greek in the first century, how one can discern between oral or written sources behind the Gospels, and how reliable either of these sources might be in representing Jesus’ putative Aramaic."
