= Ecclesia in Medio Oriente =

2012 apostolic exhortation by Pope Benedict XVI

Ecclesia in Medio Oriente Latin for 'The Church in the Middle East' Apostolic exhortation of Pope Benedict XVI
- Signature date: 14 September 2012
- Number: 4 of 4 of the pontificate
- Text: In English

Ecclesia in Medio Oriente (The Church in the Middle East) is the fourth and last post-synodal apostolic exhortation issued by Pope Benedict XVI. It was signed on 14 September 2012 in Beirut, Lebanon.
