= Truth and Tolerance =

Book by Pope Benedict XVI (2004)

- Book cover
- Author: Cardinal Joseph Ratzinger
- Original title: Glaube – Wahrheit – Toleranz: Das Christentum und die Weltreligionen
- Publisher: Ignatius Press
- Publication date: 2004
- Pages: 280
- ISBN: 978-1-58617-035-6

Truth and Tolerance (German: Glaube – Wahrheit – Toleranz: Das Christentum und die Weltreligionen) is a book written by Joseph Cardinal Ratzinger (Pope Benedict XVI), published in 2004.

The book discusses faith, religion, culture, freedom, and truth, with special emphasis on the Christian religion and how it relates to these and if it can continue to make an absolute claim as the true religion.

In the preface, he states that "beyond all particular questions, the real problem lies in the question about truth." He first tries to understand what culture is and how cultures relate to one another. Then he tries to understand man, what he is and how he can become himself. Then, in the end, he deals with the question of whether man is made for the truth and in what way he can put the question of truth.

== Reviews ==
- Review by Sarah Donahue for the Acton Institute
- Review by Ignatius Insight
- Review by Cathy Duff
- Review by Paul J. Griffiths in First Things
- Is It Arrogant to Say Christ Is the Only Savior? Asks Cardinal Ratzinger
