= Jesus of Nazareth: The Infancy Narratives =

2012 book by Pope Benedict XVI

- First edition book cover
- Author: Pope Benedict XVI
- Language: English
- Subjects: Christology; Theology
- Publisher: Image Books
- Publication date: November 21, 2012
- Publication place: United States
- Media type: Print
- Pages: 144
- ISBN: 978-1-58617-500-9
- Preceded by: Jesus of Nazareth: Holy Week

Jesus of Nazareth: The Infancy Narratives (German: Jesus von Nazareth. Die Kindheitsgeschichten) is a book written by Pope Benedict XVI, first published on November 21, 2012, by Image Books. The book is the third and final volume of the author's three-volume meditation on the life and teachings of Jesus Christ. Pope Benedict presents the stories of Jesus' infancy and childhood as being as relevant today as they were two thousand years ago. This third volume in the series was preceded by Jesus of Nazareth (2007) and Jesus of Nazareth: Holy Week (2011).

In Jesus of Nazareth: The Infancy Narratives, Pope Benedict presents the Nativity story as not merely an event in the past, but as an event of "unfolding significance" for people today, with implications for such issues as the limits of political power and the purpose of human freedom." The book includes reflections on such matters as the significance of the Virgin Birth and the way nature was perceived in ancient pagan and Judeo-Christian cultures. The author examines the birth and childhood of Jesus as recounted in the Gospel of Matthew and the Gospel of Luke. Throughout his interpretation of the biblical texts, the author references the work of other scholars and draws on a variety of academic fields, including linguistics, political science, art history and the history of science.

Jesus of Nazareth: The Infancy Narratives contains a brief foreword, four chapters, and an epilogue. In the first chapter, Pope Benedict discusses the genealogies of Jesus of Nazareth as presented in the Gospels of Matthew and Luke, which are very different, but have the same theological and symbolic meaning—placing Jesus in history and recognizing his true origin as a new beginning of world history.

In the second chapter, Pope Benedict focuses on the annunciation of the births of John the Baptist and Jesus. Through a closer reading of the dialogue between Mary and the Archangel Gabriel in the Gospel of Luke, the author explains that, through a woman, God "seeks to enter the world anew". In seeking to liberate man from sin, God requires "free obedience" to his will, quoting Bernard of Clairvaux. The author continues, "In creating freedom, he made himself in a certain sense dependent upon man. His power is tied to the unenforceable yes of a human being." Mary's assent becomes the starting point of the history of salvation.

In the third chapter, Pope Benedict focuses on the event in Bethlehem and the historical context of Jesus' birth, as well as the Roman Empire under Augustus, whose universal dimension allows a "universal Saviour" to enter into the world. The author explores the elements of the Nativity story, which hold profound meaning: the poverty in which "he who is truly the first-born of all that is" chooses to reveal himself, the "cosmic glory" that envelopes the manger, God's special love for the poor, which manifests itself in the annunciation to the shepherds, and the words of the Gloria.

In the fourth and final chapter, the author focuses on the story of the three Magi, who saw the star of the "King of the Jews" and who had come to adore the child. Pope Benedict uses the story of the Magi and their flight into Egypt—reconstructed through a rich range of historical, linguistic and scientific information—as a "fascinating emblem of the inner unrest and search for truth of the human spirit."

Jesus of Nazareth: The Infancy Narratives completes Pope Benedict's three-volume meditation on the life and teachings of Jesus Christ, which includes Jesus of Nazareth (2007) and Jesus of Nazareth: Holy Week (2011). The book was formally presented at the Vatican on November 20, 2012, and was published simultaneously in eight languages—English, Italian, German, French, Spanish, Polish, Croatian, and Portuguese—in fifty countries on November 21, 2012.
