= Jesus of Nazareth: From the Baptism in the Jordan to the Transfiguration =

2007 book by Pope Benedict XVI

Jesus of Nazareth
- First edition cover
- Author: Pope Benedict XVI
- Cover artist: Jean Traina
- Language: German
- Subjects: Christology; Theology
- Publisher: Doubleday
- Publication date: May 15, 2007
- Publication place: United States
- Media type: Print
- Pages: 355
- ISBN: 0-385-52341-6
- OCLC: 166254996
- Followed by: Jesus of Nazareth: Holy Week

Jesus of Nazareth: From the Baptism in the Jordan to the Transfiguration (German: Jesus von Nazareth. Von der Taufe im Jordan bis zur Verklärung) is the first of a series of books on the life and teachings of Jesus of Nazareth, written by Pope Benedict XVI, published in three volumes. It was published by Doubleday in 2007.

In the book's introduction, the pope explicitly states that the treatise is in "no way an exercise of the magisterium," but rather an "expression of his personal search for the face of the Lord."

The ten chapters cover the bulk of Jesus' public ministry, encompassing subjects and events such as Christ's baptism at the hands of John the Baptist, the Sermon on the Mount, the meaning of the parables, the Calling of the Twelve, the Confession of Peter, and the Transfiguration.

Two other volumes were published by Benedict on Jesus: they are called Jesus of Nazareth: Holy Week (2011) and Jesus of Nazareth: The Infancy Narratives (2012).

Ratzinger began writing the book in the summer of 2003. In the following year the first four chapters were ready. After the election to the papal throne he wrote six more, postponing the writing of a possible second volume. The book adopts the historical method with the aim of describing the "Jesus of the Gospels as the real Jesus, as the 'historical Jesus' in the true sense of the expression."

== The resurrection ==
On pages 273 and 274, Pope Benedict XVI concludes three observation on Jesus's resurrection:

1) Jesus did not simply return to normal biological life as one who by the laws of biology would eventually have to die again

2) Jesus is not a ghost. In other words, he does not belong to the realm of the dead but is somehow able to reveal himself in the realm of the living.

3) Nevertheless the encounters with the risen Lord are not the same as mystical experiences in which the human spirit is momentarily drawn aloft out of itself and perceives the realm of the divine and eternal only to return then to the normal horizon of its existence. Mystical experience is a temporary removal of the soul's spatial and cognitive limitations. But it is not an encounter with a person coming toward me from without. Saint Paul clearly distinguished his mystical experience in 2 Corinthians 12 from his encounter with the risen Lord on the road to Damascus in Acts 9. The former was a mystical event, the latter a historical one.

== Reviews ==
Writing in the conservative journal First Things, Richard B. Hays (Duke Divinity School) praised Pope Benedict for trying to find a common point between Christology and the historical Jesus, but criticized him for relying too much on 20th century scholars (such as Joachim Jeremias, Rudolf Schnackenburg and C.H. Dodd) and for ignoring studies by more recent scholars such as E. P. Sanders, N. T. Wright, Dale Allison jr., John P. Meier and Raymond E. Brown SS, the last two of whom are Catholics. He also notes that the Pontiff relies too much on the Gospel of John, using the Synoptic Gospels only to integrate Johannine narrative.

Speaking with the National Catholic Reporter, Jewish scholar Géza Vermes was also critical of Benedict's book, accusing the Pope of being ignorant of the recent developments of New Testament scholarship. The Pope was defended against such accusations by Cardinal Georges Cottier on the same publication.

British agnostic scholar Maurice Casey was also critical toward the book: in his work Jesus of Nazareth: An Independent Historian's Account of His Life and Teaching, Casey criticized the Pope for relying too much on the Gospel of John and notes that if such a book was written by a New Testament scholar, it would have attracted much less attention.

In Germany, criticism also came from skeptical scholar Gerd Lüdemann, while the book was praised by conservative scholar Klaus Berger.
