= The Spirit of the Liturgy =

2000 book by Pope Benedict XVI

- Book cover
- Author: Joseph Cardinal Ratzinger (Pope Benedict XVI)
- Language: English
- Subjects: Liturgy; Theology
- Publisher: Ignatius Press
- Publication date: 2000
- Publication place: United States
- Media type: Print

The Spirit of the Liturgy (German: Der Geist der Liturgie) is a 2000 book written by Joseph Ratzinger (Pope Benedict XVI) before his ascension to the papacy. Ratzinger called for the return to the historical practice of the liturgical orientation towards the east—the ad orientem Mass, where this is not possible, he calls for the placement of the Crucifix in the center of the altar.

== Excerpts ==
- "The Altar and the Direction of Liturgical Prayer:

The re-shaping so far described, of the Jewish synagogue for the purpose of Christian worship, clearly shows—as we have already said—how, even in architecture, there is both continuity and newness in the relationship of the Old Testament to the New."

- "Music and Liturgy:

The importance of music in biblical religion is shown very simply by the fact that the verb "to sing" (with related words such as "song", and so forth) is one of the most commonly used words in the Bible."

- Wherever applause breaks out in the liturgy because of some human achievement, it is a sure sign that the essence of liturgy has totally disappeared and has been replaced by a kind of religious entertainment.
