= Jesus of Nazareth: Holy Week =

Book by Pope Benedict XVI

- First edition book cover
- Author: Pope Benedict XVI
- Translator: Philip J. Whitmore
- Cover artist: Roxanne Mei Lum
- Language: English
- Subjects: Christology; Theology
- Published: March 15, 2011 Ignatius Press
- Publication place: United States
- Media type: Print
- Pages: 362
- ISBN: 978-1-58617-500-9
- OCLC: 664668492
- Preceded by: Jesus of Nazareth: From the Baptism in the Jordan to the Transfiguration
- Followed by: Jesus of Nazareth: The Infancy Narratives

Jesus of Nazareth: Holy Week (German: Jesus von Nazareth. Vom Einzug in Jerusalem bis zur Auferstehung, "Jesus of Nazareth: From the Entry into Jerusalem to the Resurrection") is the second volume (after Jesus of Nazareth released in 2007) in Pope Benedict XVI's three-volume meditation on the life and teachings of Jesus Christ, offers a detailed analysis of Jesus Christ's final week in Jerusalem, examining the political, religious and scholarly aspects of Jesus' life, teaching, death and resurrection.

Though Pope Benedict published numerous works when he was a cardinal and before, it is only the second book he authored during his papacy. The English translation was published by Ignatius Press (publisher) in 2011.

In this book's introduction, the author states that he has “attempted to develop a way of observing and listening to the Jesus of the Gospels that can indeed lead to a personal encounter” with him. The author continued saying that he “tried to maintain a distance from any controversies over particular points and to consider only the essential words and deeds of Jesus.”

Jesus of Nazareth's nine chapters cover the Holy Week, the period of time from The Entrance into Jerusalem and the Cleansing of the Temple by Jesus, Jesus’ Eschatological Discourse and its meaning within his teachings, The Washing of the Feet, the significance of Jesus’ High-Priestly Prayer, the date and connection to the Eucharist of The Last Supper, Jesus’ prayers at Gethsemane, the implication of The Trial of Jesus, the importance and words of the Crucifixion and Burial of Jesus, finally to Jesus’ Resurrection from the Dead.

The author challenges readers to consider the concept of the resurrection and suggests that it is something so fantastic that it cannot be explained by science. The author also suggests that blame sometimes placed on Judaism for Jesus's crucifixion belongs on select individuals rather than Jews as a whole.

The third volume in Pope Benedict XVI's three-volume meditation on the life and teachings of Jesus Christ, titled Jesus of Nazareth: The Infancy Narratives, was released November 20, 2012, published by Image Books.
