= Litany of the Most Precious Blood of Jesus =

Litany of the Roman Catholic Church

The Litany of the Most Precious Blood of Jesus is a litany of the Roman Catholic Church, usually prayed in devotion to the Eucharist. The Litany was drawn up by the Sacred Congregation of Rites and promulgated by Pope John XXIII on February 24, 1960.

== The Litany ==
Lord, have mercy on us.
Christ, have mercy on us.
Lord, have mercy on us.Christ, hear us.
Christ, graciously hear us.

God, the Father of Heaven, have mercy on us.
God the Son, Redeemer of the world, have mercy on us.
God, the Holy Ghost, have mercy on us.
Holy Trinity, One God, have mercy on us.

Blood of Christ, only-begotten Son of the Eternal Father, save us. (after each line)
Blood of Christ, Incarnate Word of God,
Blood of Christ, of the New and Eternal Testament,
Blood of Christ, falling upon the earth in the Agony,
Blood of Christ, shed profusely in the Scourging,
Blood of Christ, flowing forth in the Crowning with Thorns,
Blood of Christ, poured out on the Cross,
Blood of Christ, price of our salvation,
Blood of Christ, without which there is no forgiveness,
Blood of Christ, Eucharistic drink and refreshment of souls,
Blood of Christ, stream of mercy,
Blood of Christ, victor over demons,
Blood of Christ, courage of martyrs,
Blood of Christ, strength of confessors,
Blood of Christ, bringing forth virgins,
Blood of Christ, help of those in peril,
Blood of Christ, relief of the burdened,
Blood of Christ, solace in sorrow,
Blood of Christ, hope of the penitent,
Blood of Christ, consolation of the dying,
Blood of Christ, peace and tenderness of hearts,
Blood of Christ, pledge of Eternal Life,
Blood of Christ, freeing souls from purgatory,
Blood of Christ, most worthy of all glory and honor,

Lamb of God, Who takest away the sins of the world,
Spare us, O Lord.
Lamb of God, Who takest away the sins of the world,
Graciously hear us, O Lord.
Lamb of God, Who takest away the sins of the world,
Have mercy on us.

V. Thou hast redeemed us, O Lord, in Thy Blood.
R. And made us, for our God, a kingdom.

Let us pray:
Almighty and eternal God, Thou hast appointed Thine only-begotten Son the Redeemer of the world and willed to be appeased by his blood. Grant, we beg of Thee, that we may worthily adore this price of our salvation and through its power be safeguarded from
the evils of the present life so that we may rejoice in its fruits forever in heaven. Through the same Christ our Lord. Amen.

== Indulgence ==
The 2004 Enchiridion Indulgentiarum grants the partial indulgence to the faithfuls of Christ who piously pray the Litanies.

== See also ==
- Prayer in the Catholic Church
- Litanies
