= Indulgence =

Remission of sins in the Catholic Church

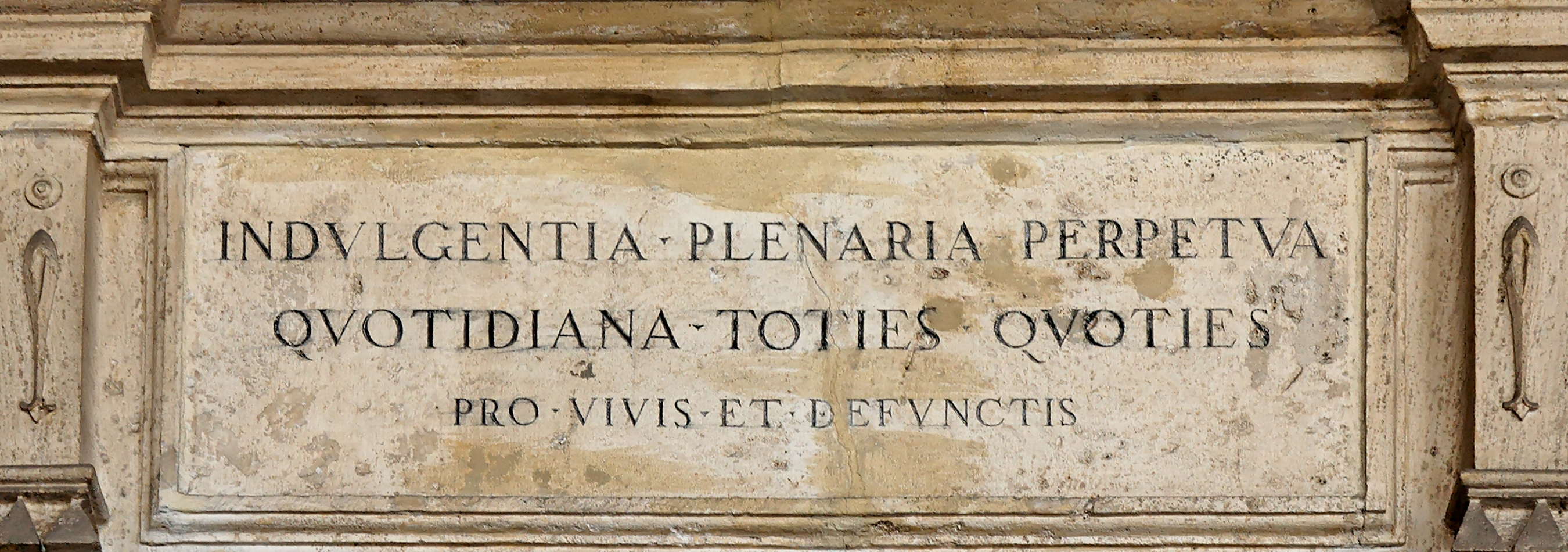
Inscription on the Archbasilica of St. John Lateran in Rome: Indulgentia plenaria perpetua quotidiana toties quoties pro vivis et defunctis (English: "Perpetual everyday plenary indulgence on every occasion for the living and the dead")

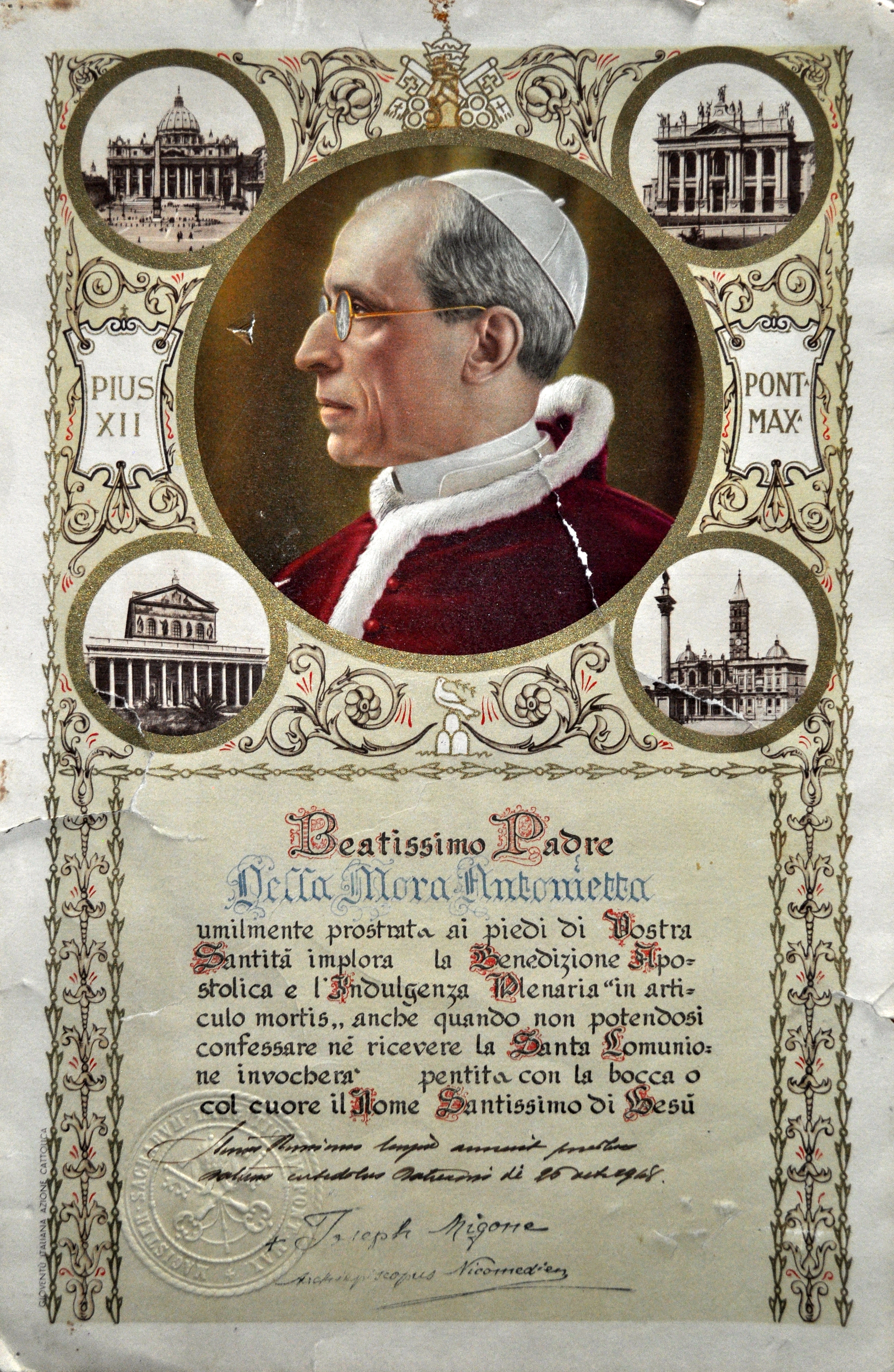
Apostolic Benediction and Plenary Indulgence Parchment, featuring picture of Pope Pius XII

In the teaching of the Catholic Church, an indulgence (Latin: indulgentia, from indulgeo, 'permit') is "a way to reduce the amount of punishment one has to undergo for (forgiven) sins". The Catechism of the Catholic Church describes an indulgence as "a remission before God of the temporal punishment due to sins whose guilt has already been forgiven, which the faithful Christian who is duly disposed gains under certain prescribed conditions…" (Note: "… through the action of the Church which, as the minister of redemption, dispenses and applies with authority the treasury of the satisfactions of Christ and all of the saints".)

The recipient of an indulgence must perform an action to receive it. This is most often the saying (once, or many times) of a specified prayer, but may also include a pilgrimage, the visiting of a particular place (such as a shrine, church, or cemetery), or the performance of specific good works.

Indulgences were introduced to allow for the remission of the severe penances of the early church and granted at the intercession of Christians awaiting martyrdom or at least imprisoned for the faith. The Catholic Church teaches that indulgences draw on the treasury of merit accumulated by Jesus's death on the cross and the virtues and penances of the saints. They are granted for specific good works and prayers in proportion to the devotion with which those good works are performed or prayers recited.

By the late Middle Ages, indulgences were used to support charities for the public good, including hospitals. However, there was widespread abuse of indulgences for almsgiving, so that they became a method of moneyraising or ignored the requirements for contrition or charity, had become a serious problem which the church recognized but was unable to restrain effectively. Abuses in the practice and teaching on indulgences were, from the beginning of the Protestant Reformation, a target of attacks by Martin Luther and other Protestant theologians. Eventually, the Catholic Counter-Reformation curbed the abuses of indulgences, but indulgences continue to play a role in modern Catholic religious life, and were dogmatically confirmed as part of the Catholic faith by the Council of Trent. In 1567, Pope Pius V forbade tying indulgences to any financial act, even to the giving of alms. Reforms in the 20th century largely abolished the quantification of indulgences, which had been expressed in terms of days or years. These days or years were meant to represent the equivalent of time spent in penance, although it was widely mistaken to mean time spent in Purgatory. The reforms also greatly reduced the number of indulgences granted for visiting particular churches and other locations.

== Catholic teaching ==
Catholic teaching states that when a person sins, they acquire the liability of guilt and the liability of punishment. A mortal sin, one that is grave or serious in nature and is committed knowingly and freely, is considered to be an active refusal of communion with God, and to separate a person from Him to the end of suffering the eternal death of hell as an effect of this rejection, a consequence known as the "eternal punishment" of sin. The Sacrament of Penance removes this guilt and the liability of eternal punishment related to mortal sin.

The forgiveness of sin and restoration of communion with God entail the remission of the eternal punishment of sin, but the temporal punishment of sin remains. An example of this can be seen in 2 Samuel 12, when, after David repents of his sin, the prophet Nathan tells him that he is forgiven, but, "Thus says the Lord God of Israel:...Now, therefore, the sword shall never depart from your house, because you have despised me and have taken the wife of Uriah to be your wife."

In addition to the eternal punishment due to mortal sin, every sin, including venial sin, is a turning away from God through what the Catechism of the Catholic Church calls an "unhealthy attachment to creatures", an attachment that must be purified either here on earth, or after death in the state called purgatory. "The process of sanctification and interior renewal requires not only forgiveness from the guilt (culpa) of sin, but also purification from the harmful effects or wounds of sin." This purification process gives rise to "temporal punishment", because, not involving a total rejection of God, it is not eternal and can be expiated. Catholic teaching states that the temporal punishment of sin should be accepted as a grace, and that the sinner "should strive by works of mercy and charity, as well as by prayer and the various practices of penance, to put off completely the 'old man' and to put on the 'new man'."

The temporal punishment that follows sin is thus undergone either during life on earth or in purgatory. In this life, as well as by patient acceptance of sufferings and trials, the necessary cleansing from attachment to creatures may, at least in part, be achieved by turning to God in prayer and penance and by works of mercy and charity. Indulgences (from the Latin verb 'indulgere', meaning "to forgive", "to be lenient toward") are a help towards achieving this purification.

An indulgence does not forgive the guilt of sin, nor does it provide release from the eternal punishment associated with unforgiven mortal sins. The Catholic Church teaches that indulgences relieve only the temporal punishment resulting from the effect of sin (the effect of rejecting God the source of good), and that a person is still required to have their grave sins absolved, ordinarily through the sacrament of Confession, to receive salvation. Similarly, an indulgence is not a permit to commit sin, a pardon of future sin, nor a guarantee of salvation for oneself or for another. Ordinarily, forgiveness of mortal sins is obtained through Confession (also known as the sacrament of penance or reconciliation).

According to the Catechism of the Catholic Church, "The 'treasury of the Church' is the infinite value, which can never be exhausted, which Christ's merits have before God. They were offered so that the whole of mankind could be set free from sin and attain communion with the Father. ... In Christ, the Redeemer himself, the satisfactions and merits of his Redemption exist and find their efficacy. ...This treasury includes as well the prayers and good works of the Blessed Virgin Mary. They are truly immense, unfathomable, and even pristine in their value before God. In the treasury, too, are the prayers and good works of all the saints, all those who have followed in the footsteps of Christ the Lord and by His grace have made their lives holy and carried out the mission in the unity of the Mystical Body."

Pursuant to the church's understanding of the power of binding or loosing granted by Christ, it administers to those under its jurisdiction the benefits of these merits in consideration of prayer or other pious works undertaken by the faithful. In opening for individual Christians its treasury, "the Church does not want simply to come to the aid of these Christians, but also to spur them to works of devotion, penance, and charity".

Consistent with this, Peter J. Beer, SJ, writes in Theological Studies:

I believe present Church praxis would benefit if the granting of an indulgence were restricted to a special public ceremony of penitential readings, prayers, etc., at which the bishop in person would bless those wishing to gain the indulgence, after praying over them. It would be helpful, too, if the ceremony were linked to the Eucharistic celebration. In this way the recipient would more likely feel that the full authority of the Body of Christ is supporting him as he carries out the indulgenced work.

Before the Second Vatican Council, stating that an indulgence of 40 days, 300 days or 7 years has been gained did not mean that a soul in Purgatory avoided a temporal punishment of 40 days, 300 days or 7 years; it meant, instead, that a soul in Purgatory avoided a temporal punishment of the same duration as that which it would have served with a traditional canonical penance of 40 days, 300 days or 7 years.

=== Dispositions necessary to gain an indulgence ===
An indulgence is not the purchase of a pardon which secures the buyer's salvation or releases the soul of another from purgatory. Sin is only pardoned (i.e., its effects entirely obliterated) when complete reparation in the form of sacramental confession is made and prescribed conditions are followed. After a firm amendment is made internally not to sin again, and the serious execution of one's assigned penance, the release of one from penalty in the spiritual sense consequentially follows.

An indulgence may be plenary (remits all temporal punishment required to cleanse the soul from attachment to anything but God) or partial (remits only part of the temporal punishment, i.e. cleansing, due to sin).

To gain a plenary indulgence, upon performing the charitable work or praying the aspiration or prayer for which the indulgence is granted, one must fulfill the prescribed conditions of:

1. A complete and whole-hearted detachment from all sin of any kind, even venial sin
2. Making a valid sacramental confession
3. Receiving Holy Communion in the state of grace
4. Praying for the intentions of the Pope.

The minimum condition for gaining a partial indulgence is to be contrite in heart; on this condition, a Catholic who performs the work or recites the prayer in question is granted, through the church, remission of temporal punishment equal to that obtained by the person's own action.

Since those who have died in the state of grace (with all mortal sins forgiven) are members of the communion of saints, the living (members of the Church Militant) can assist those whose purification from their sins was not yet completed at the time of death through prayer but also by obtaining indulgences in their behalf. Since the church has no jurisdiction over the dead, indulgences can be gained for them only per modum suffragii, i.e. by an act of intercession. This is sometimes termed 'impetration', which Aquinas explains "...is not founded on God's justice, but on His goodness".

On 28 August 1903, Pope Pius X allowed cardinals in their titular churches and dioceses to grant 200 days of indulgence; archbishops, 100; bishops, 50.

=== Present discipline ===
By the apostolic constitution Indulgentiarum doctrina of 1 January 1967, Pope Paul VI, responding to suggestions made at the Second Vatican Council, substantially revised the practical application of the traditional doctrine.

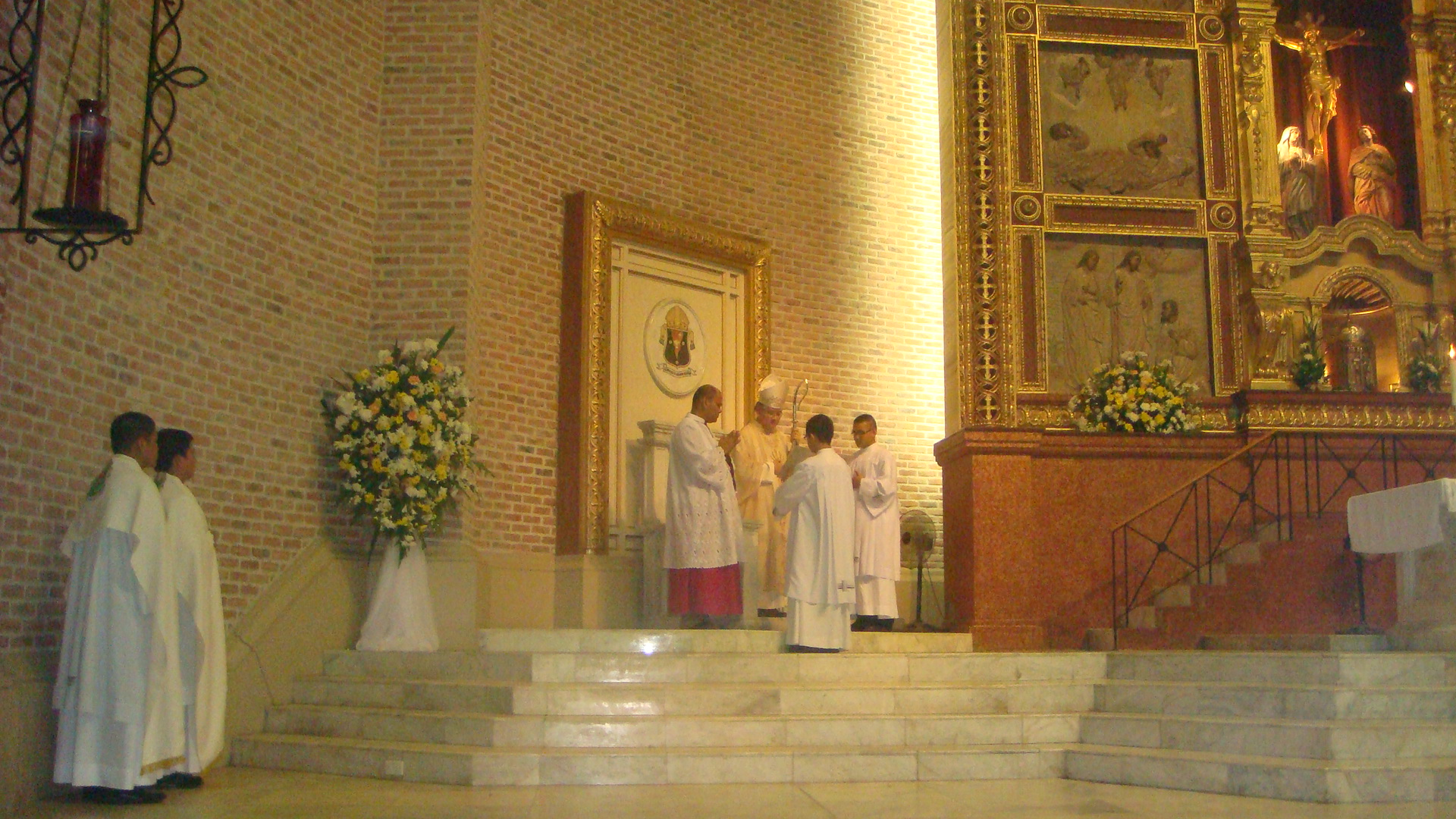
Archbishop Socrates B. Villegas bestows the Easter Mass Plenary Indulgence in 2012 (St. John the Evangelist Metropolitan Cathedral, Dagupan, Philippines).

Paul VI made it clear that the Catholic Church's aim was not merely to help the faithful make due satisfaction for their sins, but chiefly to bring them to greater fervour of charity. For this purpose he decreed that partial indulgences, previously granted as the equivalent of a certain number of days, months, quarantines (forty-day periods) or years of canonical penance, simply supplement, and to the same degree, the remission that those performing the indulgenced action already gain by the charity and contrition with which they do it.

The abolition of the classification by years and days made it clearer than before that repentance and faith are required not only for remission of eternal punishment for mortal sin but also for remission of temporal punishment for sin. In Indulgentiarum doctrina, Pope Paul VI wrote that indulgences cannot be gained without a sincere conversion of outlook and unity with God.

In the same bill, Pope Paul ordered that the official list of indulgenced prayers and good works, called the Raccolta, be revised "with a view to attaching indulgences only to the most important prayers and works of piety, charity and penance". The Raccolta was replaced with the Enchiridion Indulgentiarum. While a number of indulgenced prayers and good works were removed from the list, it now includes new general grants of partial indulgences that apply to a wide range of prayerful actions, and it indicates that the prayers that it does list as deserving veneration on account of divine inspiration or antiquity or as being in widespread use are only examples of those to which the first of these general grants applies: "Raising the mind to God with humble trust while performing one's duties and bearing life's difficulties, and adding, at least mentally, some pious invocation". In this way, the Enchiridion Indulgentiarum, in spite of its smaller size, classifies as indulgenced an immensely greater number of prayers than were treated as such in the Raccolta.

Canons 992–997 of the 1983 Code of Canon Law provide a general regulation of indulgences.

==== Subjects who have the power to grant indulgences ====
Both partial and plenary indulgences can be granted by the diocesan bishop or eparch, by the major archbishop, metropolitan and patriarch, by the cardinal, as well as by the Pope and the Apostolic Penitentiary.

For patriarchs this applies in the individual localities of the patriarchate, in churches that follow the specific rite of the patriarchate beyond its borders, and everywhere for the faithful of their own rite.

Cardinal bishops enjoy the faculty of granting only partial indulgence in any place. This indulgence can be purchased only by those who are present in the individual places from time to time.

==== Actions for which indulgences are granted ====
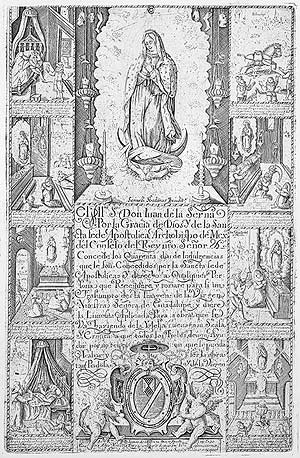
A 1948 reproduction of the Stradanus engraving, a 17th-century certificate for indulgences, in return for cash contributions to build a shrine

===== Partial indulgences =====
There are four general grants of indulgence, which are meant to encourage the faithful to infuse a Christian spirit into the actions of their daily lives and to strive for perfection of charity. These indulgences are partial, and their worth therefore depends on the fervour with which the person performs the recommended actions:

1. Raising the mind to God with humble trust while performing one's duties and bearing life's difficulties, and adding, at least mentally, some pious invocation.
2. Devoting oneself or one's goods compassionately in a spirit of faith to the service of one's brothers and sisters in need.
3. Freely abstaining in a spirit of penance from something licit and pleasant.
4. Freely giving open witness to one's faith before others in particular circumstances of everyday life.

According to the 1968 Enchiridion of Indulgences, a partial indulgence is granted to the faithful for the following actions if done in conjunction with the receiving of the Sacraments of Communion and Penance as well as praying an intention for the Pope:

- Making an act of faith, hope, charity, contrition, or spiritual communion
- Spending some time in mental prayer
- Penitentially praying such prayers as the...
  - Hidden God (Adoro te devote)
  - To You, O Blessed Joseph (Ad te beate Ioseph)
  - Certain prayers from the Roman Breviary (We Give You Thanks, Lord God Almighty, Let Us Pray for our Sovereign Pontiff, O Sacred Banquet, Holy Mary Help of the Helpless, Holy Apostles Peter and Paul, Visit We Beg You O Lord)
  - Angel of God
  - Angel of the Lord
  - Soul of Christ (Anima Christi)
  - Hear Us (Roman Ritual)
  - May it Please you O Lord
  - Eternal Rest
  - Hail Holy Queen
  - We Fly To Your Patronage
  - Come, Holy Spirit
  - Litany of the Name of Jesus, of the Heart of Jesus, of the Blood of Jesus, of the Virgin Mary, of Saint Joseph, or of All Saints
  - Little Office of the Passion, of the Heart of Jesus, of the Immaculate Conception, or of Saint Joseph
  - Apostles' Creed
  - Nicene Creed
  - Lauds or Vespers of the Office of the Dead
  - Psalm 50
  - Psalm 129
  - Magnificat
  - Memorare (Remember O Most Gracious Virgin Mary)
- Teaching or learning Christian doctrine
- Visiting a Christian catacomb
- Praying for sacerdotal or religious vocations
- Praying for the return of non-Catholic Christians to the Catholic Church
- Making the Sign of the Cross
- Renewal of baptismal promises

===== Plenary indulgences =====
Among the particular grants, which, on closer inspection, will be seen to be included in one or more of the four general grants, especially the first, the Enchiridion Indulgentiarum draws special attention to four activities for which a plenary indulgence can be gained on any day, though only once a day:

1. Piously reading or listening to Sacred Scripture for at least half an hour.
2. Adoration of Jesus in the Eucharist for at least half an hour.
3. The pious exercise of the Stations of the Cross.
4. Recitation of the Rosary or the Akathist in a church or oratory, or in a family, a religious community, an association of the faithful and, in general, when several people come together for an honourable purpose.

The prayers specifically mentioned in the Enchiridion Indulgentiarum are not of the Latin Church tradition alone, but also from the traditions of the Eastern Catholic Churches, such as the Akathistos, Paraklesis, Evening Prayer, and Prayer for the Faithful Departed (Byzantine), Prayer of Thanksgiving (Armenian), Prayer of the Shrine and the Lakhu Mara (Chaldean), Prayer of Incense and Prayer to Glorify Mary the Mother of God (Coptic), Prayer for the Remission of Sins and Prayer to Follow Christ (Ethiopian), Prayer for the Church, and Prayer of Leave-taking from the Altar (Maronite), and Intercessions for the Faithful Departed (Syrian).

Besides the above actions, the 1968 Enchiridion of Indulgences lists the following actions as granting a plenary indulgence:

- First Communion
- First Mass of a newly ordained priest

====== Special indulgences ======
A plenary indulgence may also be gained on some occasions, which are not everyday occurrences. They include but are not limited to:

- Receiving, even by radio or television, the blessing given by the Pope Urbi et Orbi ('to the city [of Rome] and to the world') or that which a bishop is authorized to give three times a year to the faithful of his diocese.
- Taking part devoutly in the celebration of a day devoted on a world level to a particular religious purpose. Under this heading come the annual celebrations such as the World Day of Prayer for Vocations, and occasional celebrations such as World Youth Day.
- Taking part for at least three full days in a spiritual retreat.
- Taking part in some functions during the Week of Prayer for Christian Unity.

Special indulgences are also granted on occasions of particular spiritual significance such as a jubilee year or the centenary or similar anniversary of an event such as the apparition of Our Lady of Lourdes.

====== Apostolic Blessing ======
Of particular significance is the plenary indulgence attached to the Apostolic Blessing that a priest is to impart when giving the Last Rites to a person in danger of death, and which, if no priest is available, the Church grants to any rightly disposed Christian at the moment of death, on condition that that person was accustomed to say some prayers during life. In this case, the Church itself makes up for the three conditions normally required for a plenary indulgence: sacramental confession, Eucharistic communion and prayer for the Pope's intentions.

===== Coronavirus plenary indulgences =====
On 20 March 2020, the Apostolic Penitentiary issued three plenary indulgences.

- The first indulgence was for victims of COVID-19 and those helping them. The actions that the indulgence was attached to included praying the rosary, the Stations of the Cross, or at least praying the Creed, Lord's Prayer, and a Marian prayer.
- The second plenary indulgence was for the victims of COVID-19 at their hour of death.
- The third indulgence was for those who made an offering for an "end of the epidemic, relief for those who are afflicted and eternal salvation for those whom the Lord has called to Himself." The offering was either a visit to the Eucharist, Eucharistic adoration, Rosary, Stations of the Cross, Chaplet of the Divine Mercy, or reading the Bible for half an hour.

The Penitentiary took the extraordinary step of loosening the requirements regarding sacramental Communion and Confession, due to the impossibility of carrying them out in a timely fashion during lockdowns and suspension of liturgies in the pandemic. The Vatican also reminded Catholics that, in cases where sacramental confession is impossible, an act of perfect contrition grants one forgiveness of sin.

== History ==
=== Early and medieval beliefs ===
In the early Church, especially from the third century on, ecclesiastic authorities allowed a confessor or a Christian awaiting martyrdom to intercede for another Christian in order to shorten the other's canonical penance. During the Decian persecution, many Christians obtained signed statements (libelli) certifying that they had sacrificed to the Roman gods in order to avoid persecution or confiscation of property. When these lapsi later wished to once again be admitted to the Christian community, some of the lapsi presented a second libellus purported to bear the signature of some martyr or confessor who, it was held, had the spiritual prestige to reaffirm individual Christians. Bishop Cyprian of Carthage insisted that none of the lapsi be admitted without sincere repentance.

The Council of Epaone, in what is now France, witnessed in 517 to the rise of the practice of replacing severe canonical penances with a new milder penance: its 29th canon reduced to two years the penance that apostates were to undergo on their return to the church, but obliged them to fast one day in three during those two years, to come to church and take their place at the penitents' door, and to leave with the catechumens. Any who objected to the new arrangement was to observe the much longer ancient penance.

The 6th century saw the development in Ireland of Penitentials, handbooks for confessors in assigning penance. The Penitential of Cummean counseled a priest to take into consideration in imposing a penance, the penitent's strengths and weaknesses. Some penances could be commuted through payments or substitutions. It became customary to commute penances to less demanding works, such as prayers, alms, fasts and even the payment of fixed sums of money depending on the various kinds of offenses (tariff penances). While the sanctions in early penitentials, such as that of Gildas, were primarily acts of mortification or in some cases excommunication, the inclusion of fines in later compilations derive from secular law.

By the 10th century, some penances were not replaced but merely reduced in connection with pious donations, pilgrimages, and similar meritorious works. Then, in the 11th and 12th centuries, the recognition of the value of these works began to become associated not so much with canonical penance but with remission of the temporal punishment due to sin. A particular form of the commutation of penance was practiced at the time of the Crusades when the confessor required the penitent to go on a Crusade in place of some other penance. The earliest record of a plenary indulgence was Pope Urban II's declaration at the Council of Clermont (1095) that he remitted all penance incurred by crusaders who had confessed their sins in the Sacrament of Penance, considering participation in the crusade equivalent to a complete penance. This set the pattern for all crusade indulgences going forward.

Theologians looked to God's mercy, the value of the church's prayers, and the merits of the saints as the basis on which indulgences could be granted. Around 1230 the Dominican Hugh of St-Cher proposed the idea of a "treasury" at the church's disposal, consisting of the infinite merits of Christ and the immeasurable abundance of the saints' merits, a thesis that was demonstrated by great scholastics such as Albertus Magnus and Thomas Aquinas and remains the basis for the theological explanation of indulgences.

Indulgences were intended to offer remission of the temporal punishment due to sin equivalent to that someone might obtain by performing a canonical penance for a specific period of time. As Purgatory became more prominent in Christian thinking, the idea developed that the term of indulgences related to remission of time in Purgatory. Indeed, many Late Medieval indulgences were for terms well over a human lifetime, reflecting this belief. For several centuries it was debated by theologians whether penance or purgatory was the currency of the indulgences granted, and the Church did not settle the matter definitively, for example avoiding doing so at the Council of Trent. The modern view of the Church is that the term is penance.

=== Late Medieval usage ===
A Question to a Mintmaker, woodcut by Jörg Breu the Elder of Augsburg, c. 1530, presenting the Pope and indulgences as one of three causes of inflation, the others being minting of debased coinage and cheating by merchants

Indulgences became increasingly popular in the Middle Ages as a reward for displaying piety and doing good deeds, though, doctrinally speaking, the Catholic Church stated that the indulgence was only valid for temporal punishment for sins already forgiven in the Sacrament of Confession. Indulgences were granted for acts of almsgiving, as well as prayer, pilgrimages and fasts. Because indulgences granted for almsgiving seemed to some like a simple monetary transaction, rather than seeing the indulgence as granted for the good deed itself – the act of charity done for a hospital, orphanage or church – many began to see indulgences for almsgiving as simply "buying" or "purchasing" indulgences.

The faithful asked that indulgences be given for saying their favourite prayers, doing acts of devotion, attending places of worship, and going on pilgrimage. Confraternities wanted indulgences for putting on performances and processions. Associations demanded that their meetings be rewarded with indulgences. Good deeds included charitable donations of money for a good cause, and money thus raised was used for many causes, both religious and civil. Building projects funded by indulgences include churches, hospitals, leper colonies, schools, roads, and bridges.

In the later Middle Ages growth of considerable abuses occurred. Some commissaries sought to extract the maximum amount of money for each indulgence. Professional "pardoners" (quaestores in Latin) – who were sent to collect alms for a specific project – practiced the unrestricted sale of indulgences. Many of these quaestores exceeded official church doctrine, and promised rewards such as salvation from eternal damnation in return for money. With the permission of the church, indulgences also became a way for Catholic rulers to fund expensive projects, such as Crusades and cathedrals, by keeping a significant portion of the money raised from indulgences in their lands. There was a tendency to forge documents declaring that indulgences had been granted. Indulgences grew to extraordinary magnitude, in terms of longevity and breadth of forgiveness.

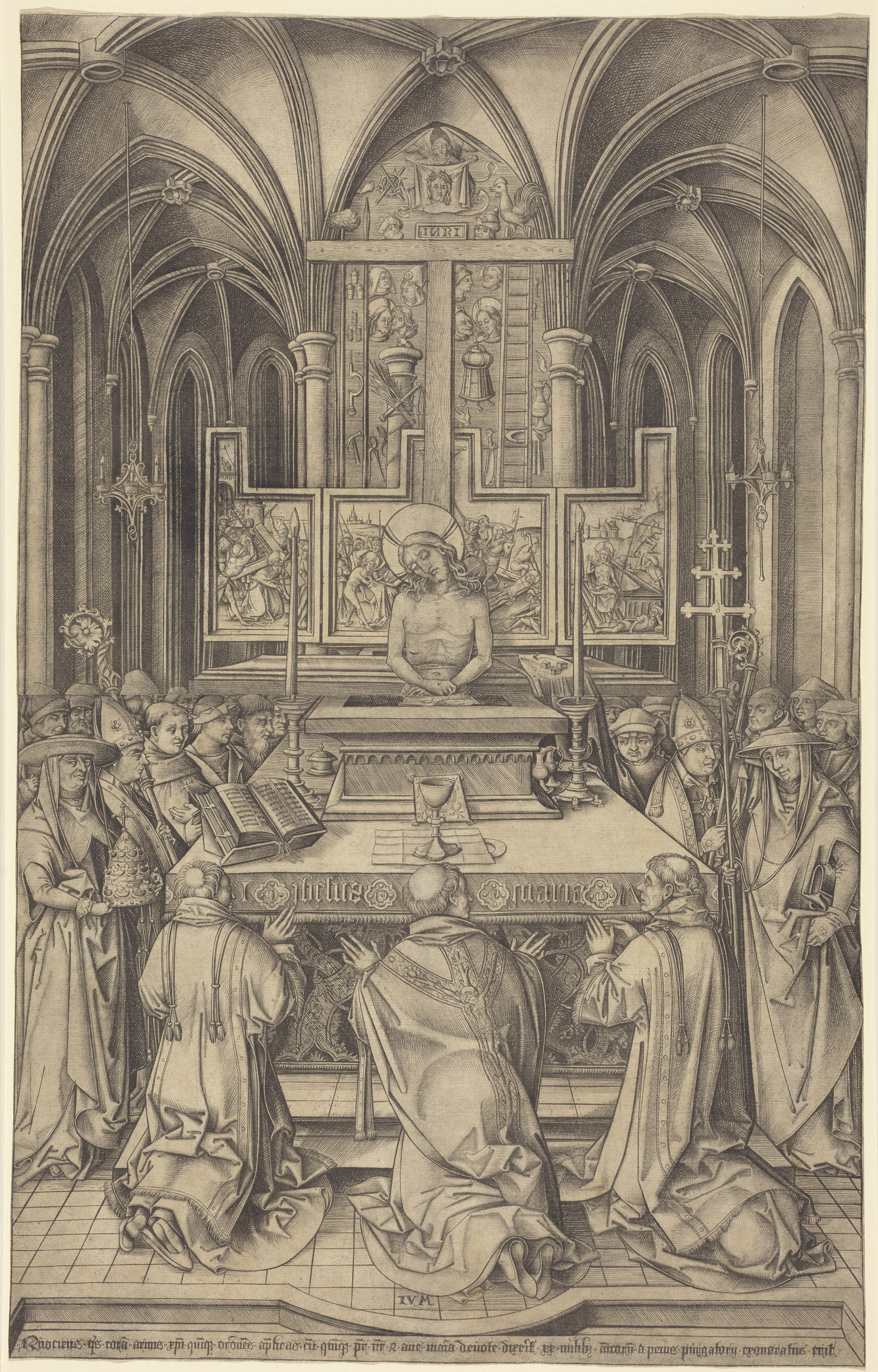
An engraving of the Mass of Saint Gregory by Israhel van Meckenem, 1490s, with an unauthorized indulgence at the bottom

The Fourth Lateran Council (1215) suppressed some abuses connected with indulgences, spelling out, for example, that only a one-year indulgence would be granted for the consecration of churches and no more than a 40-days indulgence for other occasions. The Council also stated that "Catholics who have girded themselves with the cross for the extermination of the heretics, shall enjoy the indulgences and privileges granted to those who go in defense of the Holy Land."

Very soon these limits were widely exceeded. False documents were circulated with indulgences surpassing all bounds: indulgences of hundreds or even thousands of years. In 1392, more than a century before Martin Luther published the Ninety-five Theses, Pope Boniface IX wrote to the Bishop of Ferrara condemning the practice of certain members of religious orders who falsely claimed that they were authorized by the pope to forgive all sorts of sins, and obtained money from the simple-minded faithful by promising them perpetual happiness in this world and eternal glory in the next. The "Butter Tower" of Rouen Cathedral earned its nickname because the money to build it was raised by the sale of indulgences allowing the use of butter during Lent.

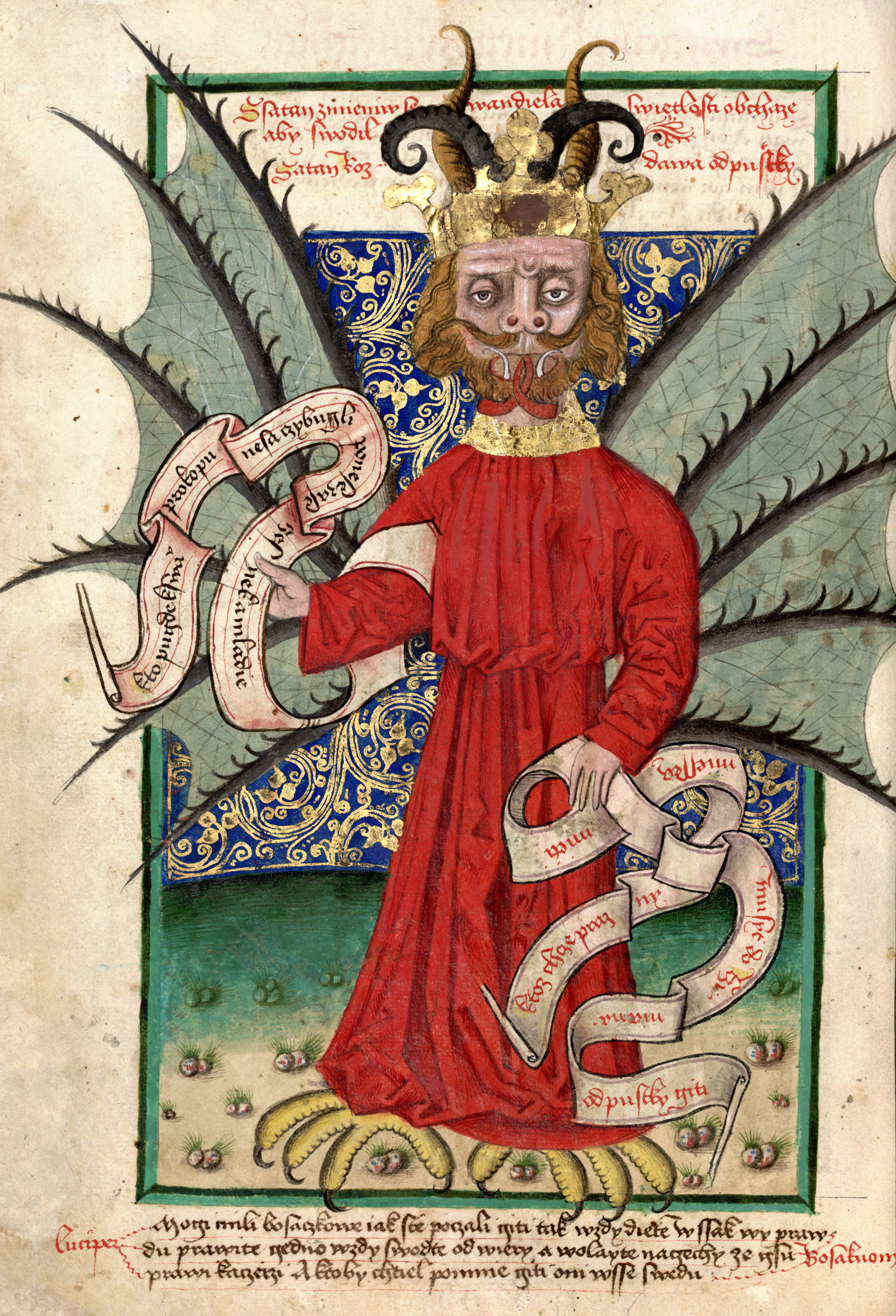
Satan Distributing Indulgences, an illumination from a Czech manuscript, 1490s. Jan Hus, the main leader of the Bohemian Reformation, condemned the selling of indulgences in 1412.

An engraving by Israhel van Meckenem of the Mass of Saint Gregory contained a "bootlegged" indulgence of 20,000 years; one of the copies of this plate (not the one illustrated, but also from the 1490s) was altered in a later state to increase it to 45,000 years. The indulgences applied each time a specified collection of prayers – in this case seven each of the Creed, Our Father, and Hail Mary – were recited in front of the image.

The image of the Mass of Saint Gregory had been especially associated with large indulgences since the jubilee year of 1350 in Rome, when it was at least widely believed that an indulgence of 14,000 years had been granted for praying in the presence of the Imago Pietatis ("Man of Sorrows"), a popular pilgrimage destination in the basilica of Santa Croce in Gerusalemme in Rome.

=== Protestant Reformation ===
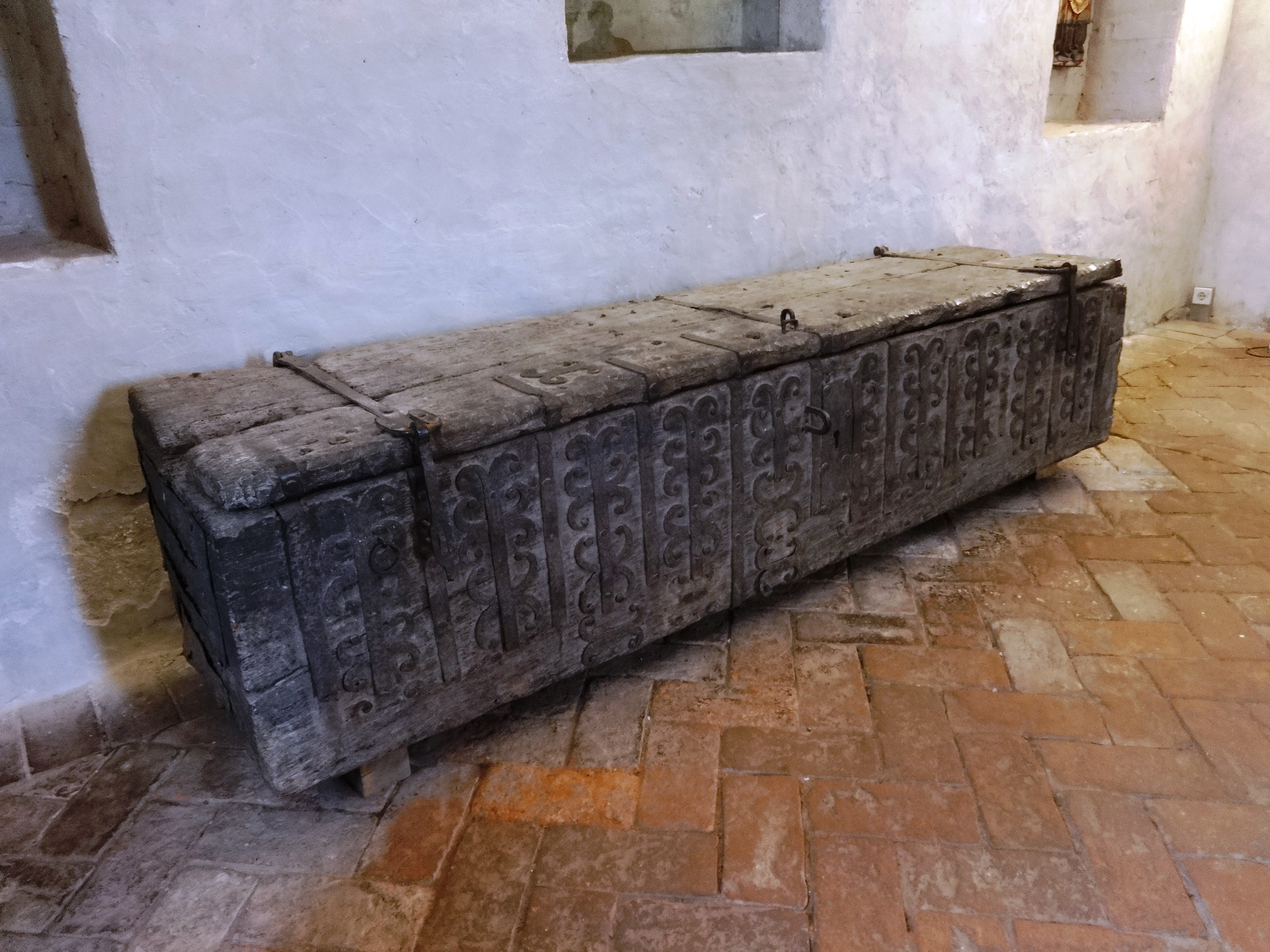
Tetzel's coffer, on display at the St. Nikolai church in Jüterbog

The scandalous conduct of the "pardoners" was an immediate occasion of the Protestant Reformation. In 1517, Pope Leo X offered indulgences for those who gave alms to rebuild St. Peter's Basilica in Rome.

The aggressive marketing practices of Johann Tetzel in promoting this cause provoked Martin Luther to write his Ninety-five Theses, condemning what he saw as the purchase and sale of salvation. In Thesis 28 Luther objected to a saying attributed to Tetzel: "As soon as a coin in the coffer rings, a soul from purgatory springs". The Ninety-five Theses not only denounced such transactions as worldly but denied the pope's right to grant pardons on God's behalf in the first place: the only thing indulgences guaranteed, Luther said, was an increase in profit and greed, because the pardon of the church was in God's power alone.

This oft-quoted saying was by no means representative of the official Catholic teaching on indulgences, but rather, more a reflection of Tetzel's capacity to exaggerate. Yet if Tetzel overstated the matter in regard to indulgences for the dead, his teaching on indulgences for the living was pure. A German Catholic historian of the Papacy, Ludwig von Pastor, explains:

Above all, a most clear distinction must be made between indulgences for the living and those for the dead.

As regards indulgences for the living, Tetzel always taught pure doctrine. The assertion that he put forward indulgences as being not only a remission of the temporal punishment of sin, but as a remission of its guilt, is as unfounded as is that other accusation against him, that he sold the forgiveness of sin for money, without even any mention of contrition and confession, or that, for payment, he absolved from sins which might be committed in the future. His teaching was, in fact, very definite, and quite in harmony with the theology of the Church, as it was then and as it is now, i.e., that indulgences "apply only to the temporal punishment due to sins which have been already repented of and confessed"….

The case was very different with indulgences for the dead. As regards these there is no doubt that Tetzel did, according to what he considered his authoritative instructions, proclaim as Christian doctrine that nothing but an offering of money was required to gain the indulgence for the dead, without there being any question of contrition or confession. He also taught, in accordance with the opinion then held, that an indulgence could be applied to any given soul with unfailing effect. Starting from this assumption, there is no doubt that his doctrine was virtually that of the drastic proverb:

"As soon as money in the coffer rings, the soul from purgatory's fire springs."

The Papal Bull of indulgence gave no sanction whatever to this proposition. It was a vague scholastic opinion, rejected by the Sorbonne in 1482, and again in 1518, and certainly not a doctrine of the church, which was thus improperly put forward as dogmatic truth. The first among the theologians of the Roman court, Cardinal Cajetan, was the enemy of all such extravagances, and declared emphatically that, even if theologians and preachers taught such opinions, no faith need be given them. "Preachers," said he, "speak in the name of the Church only so long as they proclaim the doctrine of Christ and His Church; but if, for purposes of their own, they teach that about which they know nothing, and which is only their own imagination, they must not be accepted as mouthpieces of the Church. No one must be surprised if such as these fall into error."

— Ludwig von Pastor, The History of the Popes, from the Close of the Middle Ages, pp. 347–348

Tetzel denied preaching this, writing in 1518 that "Whoever says that a soul cannot rise to heaven before the money rings in the box, commits an error.": i.e., his "as soon as" says the benefit is instant not exclusive. August Wilhelm Dieckhoff also argued against Tetzel's corruption, writing that he only preached "orthodox Catholic teaching on indulgences and Protestants have been grossly misled about this man".

While Luther initially did not deny the pope's right to grant pardons for penance imposed by the Church, he made it clear that preachers who claimed indulgences absolved those who obtained them from all punishments and granted them salvation were in error, in agreement with Catholic theology. In Article 71, Luther asserted apostolic pardons.

Erasmus also criticized the abuse of indulgences in his foreword to his De bello turcico (1530), where he stated that it appeared to be "nothing but a commercial transaction" and described how the money that was collected disappeared in the hands of princes, officials, commissaries, and confessors.

Historian Peter Marshall states that Luther did not oppose the idea of indulgences directly, as he conceded that "bishops and parish priests are bound to admit commissaries of the apostolic indulgences with all reverence" and cautioned that "one should not hinder someone from buying them". Luther was solely concerned with the theological matters, and argued against the indulgences as to advance his concept of salvation by faith alone (sola fide). Luther also doubted whether a soul in purgatory was guaranteed to achieve salvation at all, eventually rejecting the existence of purgatory as a whole; this was contrary to the teaching of the Catholic Church and its Doctors, such as Thomas Aquinas. As such, Marshall argues that "Luther did not deny that indulgences were useful, or that the pope's intentions in issuing them were good", but merely objected to them because of his theological views rather than the alleged corruption of the Church. Contemporary German humanist Johann Cochlaeus argued that "Luther was not genuinely moved by concerns about abuses in the preaching of indulgences". The idea of indulgences as the underlying cause of the Reformation and a symbol of the Catholic Church's corruption was also disputed by Lutheran theologians such as August Wilhelm Dieckhoff and Gustav Kawerau. Marshall clarifies the nature of the indulgences at the time of the Reformation, writing:

In light of what was to happen in 1517, it is important to stress that most indulgences were not dispensed outwards from Rome in imperious, high-to-low fashion. As with Elector Frederick's initiative in Wittenberg, but usually on a much smaller scale, they originated with local communities, with people petitioning Rome to grant an indulgence in support of their particular causes and concerns. The aim might be to add lustre to pilgrimage sites, but was often in aid of the building or rebuilding of churches, or even to assist with what might look to us like 'community projects', such as the construction of roads and bridges. It seems likely that people quite often purchased indulgences, not out of a neurotic concern with the condition of their souls, but in order to support such worthwhile causes, much as we might take a sticker from a charity-collector today.

— Peter Marshall, 1517: Martin Luther and the Invention of the Reformation (2017), p. 26

=== Council of Trent ===
On 16 July 1562, the Council of Trent suppressed the office of quaestores and reserved the collection of alms to two canon members of the chapter, who were to receive no remuneration for their work; it also reserved the publication of indulgences to the bishop of the diocese. Then, on 4 December 1563, in its final session, the Council addressed the question of indulgences directly, declaring them "most salutary for the Christian people", decreeing that "all evil gains for the obtaining of them be wholly abolished", and instructing bishops to be on the watch for any abuses concerning them.

A few years later, in 1567, Pope Pius V canceled all grants of indulgences involving any fees or other financial transactions. This meant that indulgences would continue to be attached to virtuous acts of prayer, piety and pilgrimages, but no longer would they be attached to almsgiving, because the potential for abuse of such indulgences was deemed too great.

After the Council of Trent, Clement VIII established a commission of Cardinals to deal with indulgences according to the mind of the Council. It continued its work during the pontificate of Paul V and published various bulls and decrees on the matter. However, only Clement IX established a true Congregation for Indulgences and Sacred Relics with a Brief of 6 July 1669. In a motu proprio on 28 January 1904, Pius X joined the Congregation of Indulgences with that of Rites, but with the restructuring of the Roman Curia in 1908 all matters regarding indulgences were assigned to the Roman Inquisition then renamed Sacred Congregation of the Holy Office. In a motu proprio on 25 March 1917, Benedict XV transferred the Holy Office's Section for Indulgences to the Apostolic Penitentiary, but maintained the Holy Office's responsibility for matters regarding the doctrine of indulgences.

== Eastern Orthodox Church ==
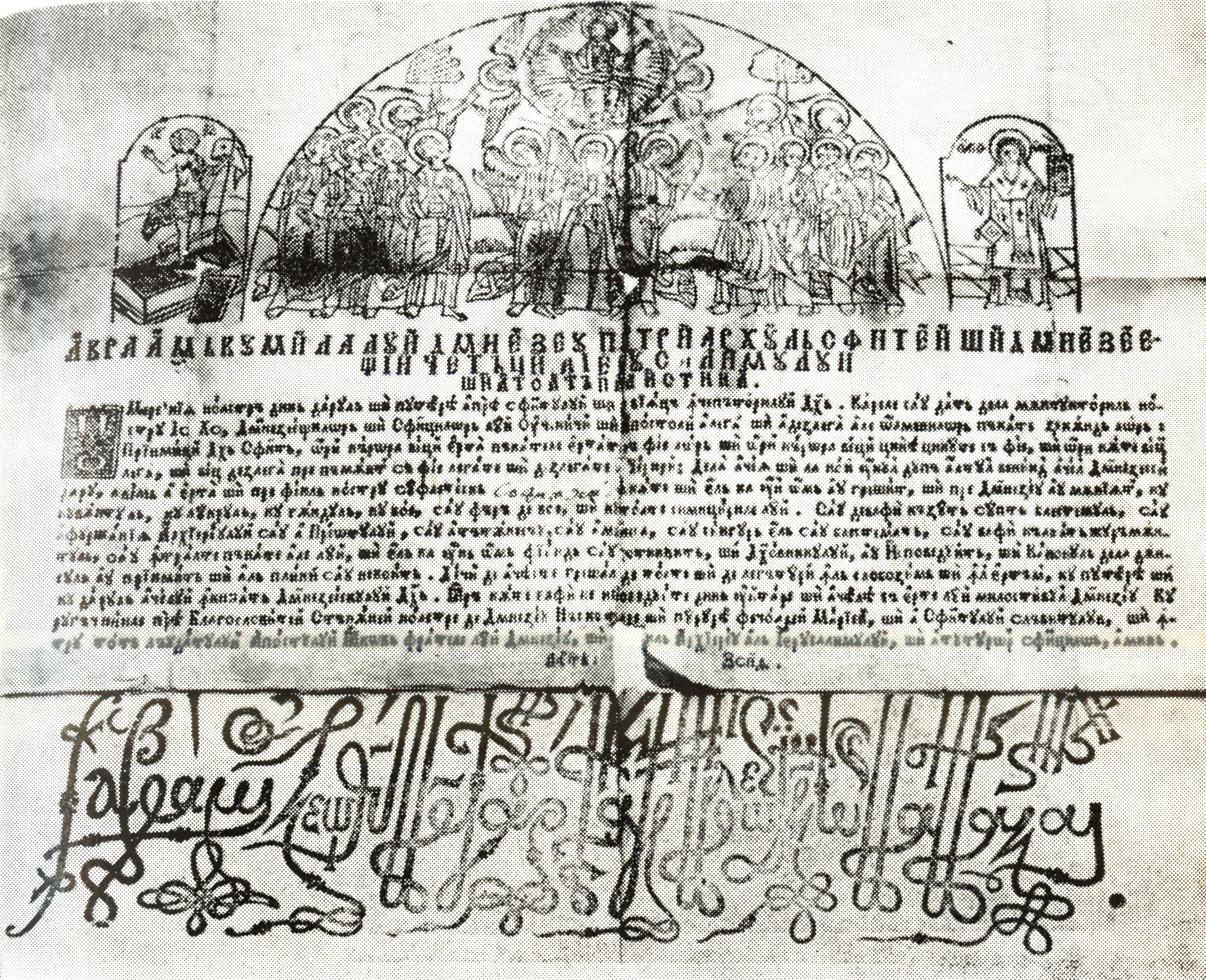
An 18th-century absolution certificate granted by the Patriarch of Jerusalem and sold by Greek monks in Wallachia (History Museum, Bucharest)

The Eastern Orthodox Churches believe one can be absolved from sins by the Sacred Mystery of Confession. Because of differences in the theology of salvation, indulgences for the remission of temporal punishment of sin currently do not exist in Eastern Orthodoxy, but until the twentieth century there existed in some places a practice of absolution certificates (Greek: συγχωροχάρτια – synchorochartia) which was essentially identical to indulgences, and in many cases much more extravagant.

Some of these certificates were connected with any patriarch's decrees lifting some serious ecclesiastical penalty, including excommunication, for the living or the dead. However, because of the expense of maintaining the Holy Places and paying the many taxes levied on them, the Greek Orthodox Patriarch of Jerusalem, with the approval of the Ecumenical Patriarch of Constantinople, had the sole privilege of distributing such documents in large numbers to pilgrims or sending them elsewhere, sometimes with a blank space for the name of the beneficiary, living or dead, an individual or a whole family, for whom the prayers would be read.

Greek Orthodox Patriarch of Jerusalem Dositheos Notaras (1641–1707) wrote: "It is an established custom and ancient tradition, known to all, that the Most Holy Patriarchs give the absolution certificate (συγχωροχάρτιον – synchorochartion) to the faithful people ... they have granted them from the beginning and still do."

Starting from the 16th century, Orthodox Christians of the Greek Church rather extensively, although not officially in penitential practice, used "permissive letters" (συγχωροχάρτια), in many ways similar to indulgences. The status of an official ecclesiastical document is obtained at the Council of Constantinople in 1727, the resolution of which reads: "The power of the abandonment of sins, which, if filed in writing, which the Eastern Church of Christ calls "permissive letters", and the Latin people "indulgences"... is given by Christ in the holy Church. These "permissive letters" are issued throughout the catholic (universal) Church by the four holiest patriarchs: Constantinople, Alexandria, Antioch, and Jerusalem." From the 13th to the 17th centuries, it was used in Russia. Indulgences as a means of enrichment were condemned at the Council of Constantinople in 1838. Even conciliar decisions had difficulty eradicating the practice of indulgences, rooted in the people. "Permissive letters" (or indulgences) survived in Greece until the mid-20th century.

== See also ==
- Merit (Christianity)
- Pardon of Assisi
- Purgatory
- Simony
