= Urbi et Orbi =

Papal address and apostolic blessing given on certain special occasions

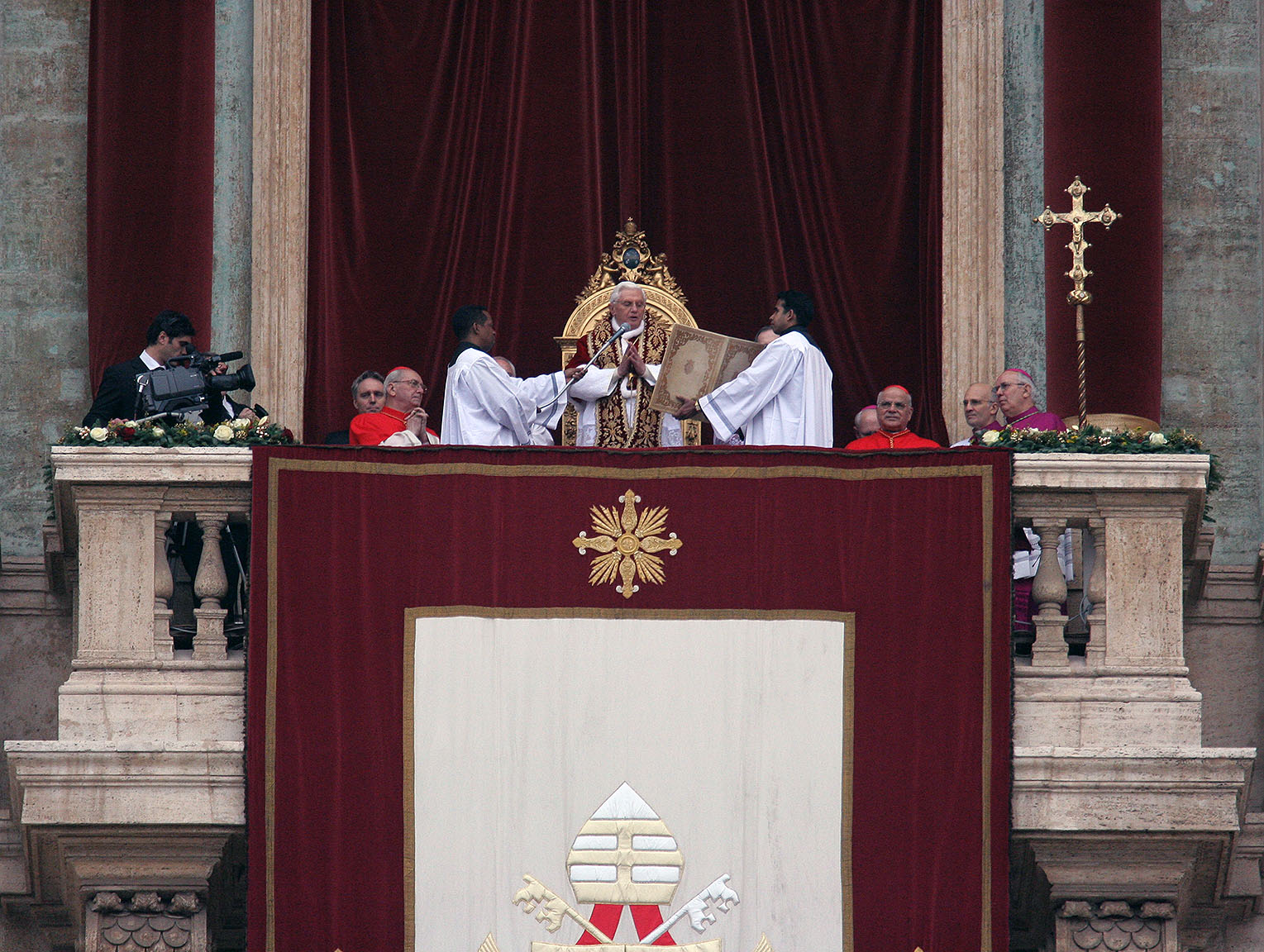
The 2008 Urbi et Orbi given by Pope Benedict XVI on Christmas Day, from Saint Peter's Square, Vatican City

Urbi et Orbi (Latin: [ur.bi ˈet ˈor.bi]; lit. 'to the city [of Rome] and to the world') denotes a papal address and apostolic blessing given by the pope on certain solemn occasions. The Urbi et Orbi address and blessing is the most solemn form of blessing in the Catholic Church, and is reserved for the most solemn occasions. These occasions include Easter, Christmas, and the proclamation of a newly elected pope concluding a conclave.

== Etymology ==
The term Urbi et Orbi evolved from the consciousness of the ancient Roman Empire. The invocation is expressed by the pope in his capacity as both the bishop of Rome (urbs = city; urbi the corresponding dative form; compare: urban) and the head of the Catholic Church throughout the world (orbis = earth; orbi the corresponding dative form; compare: orbit).

The formula is found more frequently in the language of the Church, as in the inscription at the Lateran Basilica, which is: Sacrosancta Lateranensis ecclesia omnium urbis et orbis ecclesiarum mater et caput ("Most Holy Lateran Church, of all the churches in the city and the world, the mother and head").

== History ==
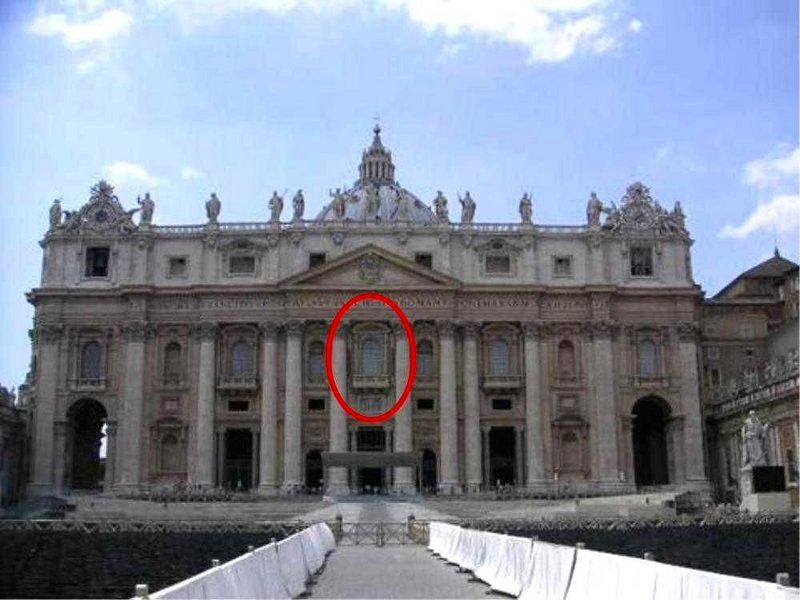
The façade of Saint Peter's Basilica with loggia balcony, where the pope usually gives the blessing Urbi et Orbi

In the 4th century, Pope Damasus I wrote in a letter to the bishops of Illyricum:

Unde iustum est, omnes in Universo Romanorum Orbe Doctores legis, ea, quae legis sunt, sapere, et non fidem doctrinis variis maculare
(Wherefore it is just that all the teachers of the law in the universe of the Roman world should be wise in the things of the law, and not to tarnish the faith with various doctrines).

The ritual of the papal blessing Urbi et Orbi developed in the 13th century during the reign of Pope Gregory X.

Prior to the occupation of Rome by the army of the Kingdom of Italy (20 September 1870), this blessing was given more frequently and at specific basilicas at Rome:

- Saint Peter's Basilica, on Holy Thursday, Easter, the Feast of Saints Peter and Paul, and at the papal coronation
- Archbasilica of St. John Lateran, on the feast of the Ascension (sometimes this was postponed until Pentecost), and when a new pope was enthroned as Bishop of Rome
- Basilica of Saint Mary Major, for the Assumption of Mary

During a Holy Year the pope gave the blessing on other occasions too for the benefit of pilgrims. In the jubilee year of 1650 Pope Innocent X did so at Epiphany, Pentecost, and All Saints. He and later popes gave such special-occasion blessings from the balcony of the Quirinal Palace, which was then the papal residence.

Pope Pius IX, who considered himself a "prisoner in the Vatican" after 1870, gave the solemn blessing of Urbi et Orbi from the balcony of the Quirinal Palace.

On 27 March 2020, Pope Francis imparted an extraordinary Urbi et Orbi blessing in order to pray for the end of the COVID-19 pandemic. He stood in a deserted Saint Peter's Square. For this blessing, the Apostolic Penitentiary loosened the requirements to receive the Eucharist and go to confession, due to the impossibility for people affected by lockdowns and suspension of liturgies. The Salus Populi Romani image and a crucifix from the church of San Marcello al Corso—both seen as miraculous—were brought to the square for the occasion. The Pope performed the blessing as a Benediction of the Blessed Sacrament.

== Current practice ==
Urbi et Orbi blessings are usually given from the central loggia of Saint Peter's Basilica in Vatican City, at noontime, and are broadcast worldwide through the European Broadcasting Union and other linkups. The address concludes with greetings in many languages in relation to the feast celebrated.

The Catholic Church grants a plenary indulgence by the willful grace and intent of the pope, "on the usual conditions", to those who "devoutly receive" the blessing that the pope imparts Urbi et Orbi.

For any ordinary plenary indulgence, these conditions are:

- An "interior disposition of complete detachment from sin"
- Reception of sacramental confession through a Catholic priest within 20 days (before or after) of performing the specific work
- Reception of Eucharistic communion within 20 days (before or after) of performing the specific work
- Prayers for the intentions of the pope designated for that particular month or occasion, usually at the same time the work is performed, though recitation some days before or after also suffices.

Gaining a plenary indulgence requires that a baptized Catholic must also exclude any attachment to sin, even venial sin.

Since 1985, this indulgence is granted not only to the people in Saint Peter's Square, but also to those who though unable to be physically present, "piously follow" it by radio or television.

This is now extended to all who receive the papal blessing over the Internet ("the new communications medium"), since the blessing is preceded by an announcement by a cardinal (usually the cardinal protodeacon): "His Holiness Pope N. grants a plenary indulgence in the form laid down by the Church to all the faithful present and to those who receive his blessing by radio, television, and the new communications media. Let us ask Almighty God to grant the Pope many years as leader of the Church and peace and unity to the Church throughout the world."

== Greetings in different languages ==
From Pope Paul VI to Pope Benedict XVI, after delivering their Urbi et Orbi message, the pope would greet the different nations in their native languages. The pope typically began by saying: "To those who listen to me, I address a cordial greeting in the different language expressions." Pope Francis discontinued this practice, but in turn was revived by Pope Leo XIV beginning in 2025.

Language	Easter (transcription)	Christmas (transcription)
Italian	Buona Pasqua a voi, uomini e donne di Roma e d’Italia!	Buon Natale agli abitanti di Roma e dell’intera Italia!
French	Le Christ est ressuscité. Sainte fête de Pâques! Que pour vous ce mystère soit source de bonheur et de paix profonde.	Heureuse et sainte fête de Noël ! Que le Christ Sauveur vous garde dans l’espérance et qu’il vous fasse le don de la paix profonde!
English	May the grace and joy of the Risen Christ be with you all.	May the birth of the Prince of Peace remind the world where its true happiness lies; and may your hearts be filled with hope and joy, for the Saviour has been born for us.
German	Euch allen ein gesegnetes und frohes Osterfest! Der Friede und die Freude des auferstandenen Herrn sei mit Euch.	Die Geburt Jesu Christi, des Erlösers der Menschen, erfülle Euer Leben mit tiefer Freude und reicher Gnade; sein Friede möge in Euren Herzen wohnen. Gesegnete und frohe Weihnachten!
Spanish	Os deseo a todos una buena y feliz fiesta de Pascua, con la paz y la alegría, la esperanza y el amor de Jesucristo Resucitado.	¡Feliz Navidad! Que la Paz de Cristo reine en vuestros corazones, en las familias y en todos los pueblos.
Portuguese	Uma Páscoa feliz com Cristo Ressuscitado.	Feliz Natal para todos! O nascimento do Menino Jesus ilumine de alegria e paz vossos lares e Nações!
Dutch	Zalig Pasen! Ik wil mijn hartelijke dank tot uitdrukking brengen voor de fraaie bloemen uit Nederland voor de Paasmis op het Sint Pietersplein.	Zalig en gelukkig Kerstmis.
Luxembourgian	Frou a geseent Oushteren.	Schéin Chreschtdag.
Greek	Χριστός άνέστη (Christós ánésti̱)	Καλά Χριστούγεννα (Kalá Christoúgenna)
Albanian	Për shumë vjet Pashkët.	Per shum vjet Krishtlindjen.
Romanian	Cristos a Înviat.	Sărbători Fericite de Crăciun si Annul Nou.
Hungarian	Krisztus feltámadott. Alleluja.	Áldott Karácsonyt.
Polish	Chrystus zmartwychwstał.	Błogosławionych świąt Bożego Narodzenia.
Sorbian	Chrystus z mortwych stanył.	Zohnowane hody! A zbožowne Nowe lěto!
Czech	Kristus vstal z mrtvých.	Narodil se vám Spasitel. Radujte se!
Slovak	Radostné veľkonočné sviatky.	Milostiplné a radostné Vianočné Sviatky.
Slovene	Blagoslovljene velikonočne praznike.	Božje Dete naj vam podeli svoj blagoslov.
Croatian	Sretan Uskrs!	Sretan Božić, Isusovo Porođenje!
Serbian	Христос васкрсе! (Hristos vaskrse!)	Среħан Божиħ – Христос се роди! (Srećan Božić – Hristos se rodi!)
Macedonian	Христос Воскресна. (Hristos Voskresna.)	Нека ви е честит Божиќ и Нова Година (Neka vi e čestit Božiḱ i Nova Godina)
Bulgarian	Христос възкресе (Khristos vŭzkrese)	Честито Рождество Христово (Chestito Rozhdestvo Khristovo)
Russian	Христос Воскресе. (Hristos Voskrese.)	Сердечно поздравляю всех с Праздником Рождества Христова (Serdechno pozdravlyayu vsekh s Prazdnikom Rozhdestva Khristova)
Byelorussian	Christos uvaskrós.	Viasiòłych kalàdnych Sviàtaû!
Ukrainian	Христос Воскрес! (Khrystos Voskres!)	Веселих Свят з Різдвом Христовим і Новим Роком! (Veselykh Svyat z Rizdvom Khrystovym i Novym Rokom!)
Mongolian	ХРИСТИЙН ДАХИН АМИЛАЛЫН БАЯРЫН МЗНД ХУРГЗЕ! Khristiin Dakhin Amilalyn Bayaryn Mendkhurgeye!	Hristijn Tersen Edrijn mendhurgie
Kazakh	Иса тірілпті (Ïsa tirilpti)	Родecтвo мepeкeci ктты болсын! (Rodectvo mepekeci kttı bolsın!)
Lithuanian	Linksmų Šventų Velykų.	Linksmų Šventų Kalėdų.
Latvian	Priecīgas lieldienas.	Priecīgus Ziemsvētkus!
Estonian	Kristus on surnuist üles tõusnud.	Häid jõulupühi.
Finnish	Siunattua pääsiäistä.	Hyvää joulua.
Swedish	Glad påsk.	God jul, gott nytt år.
Icelandic	Gleðilega Páska.	Gleðileg jól!
Irish	Beannacht na Cásca dhaoibh go léir.	Nollaig shona dhaoibh go léir.
Romani	Lachi Patrači.	Baxtalò Krečùno! Thaj Nevo berš!
Maltese	L-Għid it-tajjeb.	Il-Milied it-tajjeb lill-poplu kollu ta' Malta u Għawdex.
Georgian	K’riste Aghsdga	Gilotsavt Krist’es Shobas
Turkish	Paskalya bayramini kutlarim.	Noel bayramı kutlu olsun.
Arabic	El Messieh kahm! Hakken kahm!	Miládon-mazídon
Geʽez	ብሩኽ ፋሲካ (Burúk Fasika)	ብሩኽ ልደት (Burúk Leddat)
Hebrew	ברכות לחג הפסח (Brachot le Chag HaPesach.)	המשיח נולד; חג מולד מבורך (Hamashiach Nolad. Chag Molad Mevorach.)
Aramaic	Qmlēh maran Shwubuḥaʾ lshemēh	Hwylēh maran Shwubuḥaʾ lshemēh
Armenian	Kuhreestos harryav ee merrelotz	Sznorawórsz surp dz'nunt
Swahili	Heri na baraka zangu kwa sikukuu ja Pasaka kwenu wote.	Heri kwa noeli na baraka nyingi kwa mwaka mpya.
Kirundi and Kinyarwanda	Pasika Nziza, mwese.	Gumya umutima mu mahoro! Noeli nziza!
Malagasy	Arahaba Tratry Ny Paka.	Arahaba tratrin'i Noely.
Hindi	पास्का की शुभकामनाएं (Paaska kee shubhakaamanaen)	ख्रिस्त के जन्म उत्सव की शुभकामनाएं (Khrist ke janm utsav kee shubhakaamanaen)
Tamil	Kiṟistu uyirppu nāḷil uṅkaḷ ellōrukkum eṉ vāḻttukkaḷ!	கிறிஸ்து பிறந்த தின வாழ்த்துக்கள் (Kiṟistu piṟanta tiṉa vāḻttukkaḷ)
Malayalam	ഉയിര്‍പ്പു തിരുനാളില്‍ എല്ലാവർക്കും ഹൃദയുംഗമായ മുംഗളങ്ങള്‍ (Uyirppu thirunaalil ellaavarkkum hrudayamgamaaya mangalangal)	തിരുപിറവിയുടെ ആശുംസകള്‍ നനരുന്നു (Thiruppiraviyute aashamsakal nerunnu)
Bengalese		
Burmese		
Urdu (Pakistan)	Eid e Qayamat al Masih mubarak ho	Eid e Wiladat al Masih mubarak ho
Chinese	復活節快樂 / 复活节快乐 (Fùhuójié kuàilè)	聖誕節快樂 / 圣诞节快乐 (Shèngdànjié kuàilè)
Japanese	ご復活おめでとうございます (Go fukkatsu omedetō gozaimasu)	クリスマスと新年おめでとうございます。 (Kurisumasu-to shínnen omédetō gozáimasu)
Korean	부활을 축하합니다 (buhwal-eul chughahabnida)	기쁜 성탄에 한국의 평화를 비노라 (gippeun seongtan-e hangug-ui pyeonghwaleul binola)
Vietnamese	Mừng lễ Phục sinh.	Chúc mừng Giáng sinh.
Sinhalese	Śrī laṁkāvāsī obaṭa halelūyā!	Natthal Saamaya Oba Semata Labewaa!
Thai	สุขสันต์วันปัสกาแด่ชาวไทยทุก ๆ ท่าน! (S̄uk̄h s̄ạnt̒ wạn pạs̄kā dæ̀ chāw thịy thuk thuk th̀ān)	สุขสันต์วันคริสตสมภพ แด่พี่น้องชาวไทยที่รักทุกคน! (S̄uk̄hs̄ạnt̒ wạn khris̄t̒mās̄ s̄mp̣hph dæ̀ phī̀n̂xng chāw thịy thī̀rạk thuk khn)
Indonesian	Selamat Paskah.	Selamat Hari Natal.
Cambodian	Serea suosdei Bonchamlong.	Rīkarāy Bon Noel
Filipino	Maligayang Pasko ng Pagkabuhay.	Maligayang Pasko at Manigong Bagong Taon.
Maori	Nga mihi o te Aranga ki a koutou.	Meri Kirihimete.
Samoan	Ia manuia le Efeta.	Ia manuia le Kirisimasi.
Esperanto	Feliĉan Paskon en Kristo resurektinta.	Dibenitan Kristnaskon kaj prosperan novjaron.
Guaraní	Ña nerenyhe vy’agui, Aleluya.	Ko navidad árape che maitei ame'ê peême.
Latin	Different greeting every year	

== Formulae of apostolic blessing ==
=== Latin ===
Sancti Apostoli Petrus et Paulus, de quorum potestate et auctoritate confidimus, ipsi intercedant pro nobis ad Dominum.
℟: Amen.

Precibus et meritis beatæ Maríæ semper Virginis, beati Michaelis Archangeli, beati Ioannis Baptistæ, sanctorum Apostolorum Petri et Pauli et omnium Sanctorum, misereatur vestri omnipotens Deus, et dimissis omnibus peccctis vestris, perducat vos Iesus Christus ad vitam æternam.
℟: Amen.

Indulgentiam, absolutionem et remissionem omnium peccatorum vestrorum, spatium veræ et fructuosæ paenitentiæ, cor semper pœnitens et emendationem vitæ, gratiam et consolationem Spíritus Sancti, et finalem perseverantiam in bonis operibus, tríbuat vobis omnípotens et misericors Dominus.
℟: Amen.

Et benedíctio Dei omnipotentis, Patris, et Fílii, et Spíritus Sancti, descendat super vos et maneat semper. Amen.
℟: Amen.

=== English translation ===
May the Holy Apostles Peter and Paul, in whose power and authority we trust, intercede for us before the Lord.
℟: Amen.
Through the prayers and merits of Blessed Mary ever Virgin, Saint Michael the Archangel, Saint John the Baptist, the holy apostles Peter and Paul, and all the saints, may Almighty God have mercy on you and forgive all your sins, and may Jesus Christ bring you to everlasting life.
℟: Amen.
May the almighty and merciful Lord grant you indulgence, absolution and the remission of all your sins, a season of true and fruitful penance, a well-disposed heart, amendment of life, the grace and comfort of the Holy Spirit and final perseverance in good works.
℟: Amen.
And may the blessing of Almighty God, the Father, and the Son, and the Holy Spirit, come down on you and remain with you forever.
℟: Amen.

== Other uses ==
- Urbi et orbi is the motto of Long Island University.

== See also ==
- List of ecclesiastical abbreviations
- List of Latin phrases
