= Litany =

Form of prayer used in services and processions

Litany, in Christian worship and some forms of Jewish worship, is a form of prayer used in services and processions, and consisting of a number of petitions. The word comes through Latin litania from Ancient Greek λιτανεία (litaneía), which in turn comes from λιτή (litḗ), meaning "prayer, supplication".

== Christianity ==
=== Western Christianity ===
This form of prayer finds its model in Psalm 136: "Praise the Lord, for he is good: for his mercy endures for ever. Praise ye the God of gods . . . the Lord of lords . . . Who alone doth great wonders . . . Who made the heavens", etc., with the concluding words in each verse, "for his mercy endures for ever."

The Litany originated in Antioch in the fourth century and from there was taken to Constantinople and through it to the rest of the East...From Constantinople the Litany was taken to Rome and the West. Josef Andreas Jungmann explains how the Kyrie in the Roman Mass is best seen as a vestige of a litany at the beginning of the Mass, like that of some Eastern churches.

Public Christian devotions became common by the fifth century and processions were frequently held. These processions were called "litanies", and in them pictures and other religious emblems were carried. In Rome, pope and people would go in procession each day, especially in Lent, to a different church, to celebrate the Sacred Mysteries. Thus originated the Roman "Stations", and what was called the "Litania Maior", "Major Rogation", was held on 25 April. The word rogation comes from the Latin verb rogare, meaning "to ask", which reflects the beseeching of God for the appeasement of his anger and for protection from calamities.

In 590, when an epidemic caused by an overflow of the Tiber was ravaging Rome, Gregory the Great commanded a litany; on the preceding day he exhorted the people to fervent prayer, and arranged the order to be observed in the procession, during which the Litany of the Saints was prayed.

The "Litania Minor", also called Minor Rogations or "Gallicana", the Rogation Days before Ascension, was introduced (477) by St. Mamertus, Bishop of Vienne, on account of the earthquakes and other calamities then prevalent. It was prescribed for the whole of Frankish Gaul, in 511, by the First Council of Orléans. For Rome it was ordered by Leo III, in 799. In the Ambrosian Rite this litany was celebrated on Monday, Tuesday, and Wednesday after Ascension. In Spain, a similar litany is prayed from Thursday to Saturday after Pentecost. In England the Litany of Rogation Days was known in the earliest periods. In Germany it was ordered by a Synod of Mainz in 813.

Because the Mass Litany became popular through its use in processions, numberless varieties were soon made, especially in the Middle Ages. Litanies appeared in honour of God the Father, of God the Son, of God the Holy Spirit, of the Precious Blood, of the Blessed Virgin, of the Immaculate Conception, of each of the saints honoured in different countries, for the souls in Purgatory, etc. In 1601 Baronius wrote that about eighty forms were in circulation. To prevent abuse, Pope Clement VIII, by decree of 6 September 1601, forbade the publication of any litany, except that of the saints as found in the liturgical books and that of Loreto.

==== Anglican litanies ====
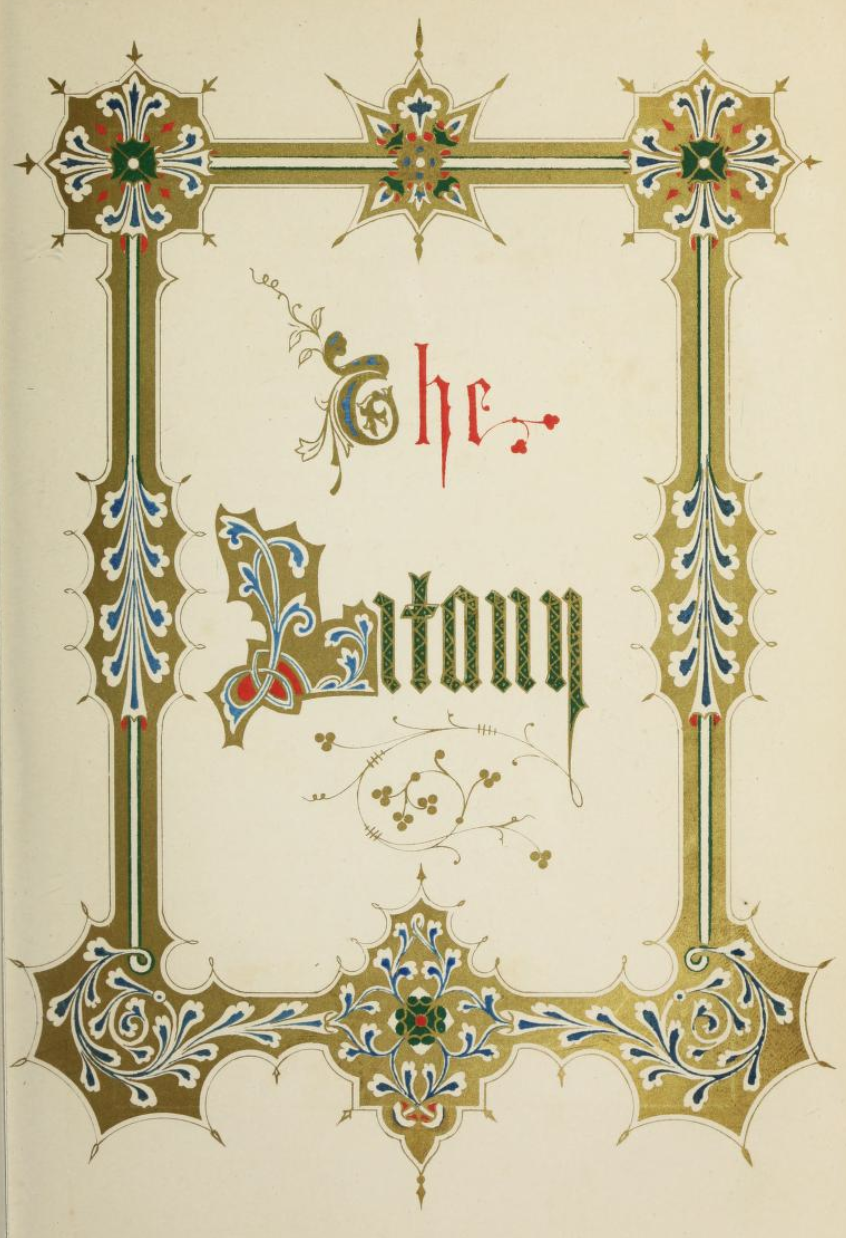
Illuminated title of "The Litany" from the 1845 illustrated Book of Common Prayer, designed by Owen Jones.

The Anglican Communion also includes a Litany in the 1662 Book of Common Prayer. This is substantially the same as Thomas Cranmer's original English vernacular service from 1544, Exhortation and Litany. Cranmer drew on a variety of sources, chiefly two medieval litanies from the Sarum rite, but also the German Litany of Martin Luther. He originally retained the invocation of the Saints and the Blessed Virgin Mary in very shortened form, but these were omitted in 1549, and he made a notable change in the style of the service by expanding and grouping together several of the separate deprecations, intercessions, obsecrations and suffrages said by the priest into groups of several, providing a single response to the whole group. An anti-papal deprecation was omitted in 1559. The processional aspect was soon eliminated and the service said or sung kneeling in the church. The term "Lesser Litany" is sometimes used to refer to the versicles and responses, with the Lord's Prayer, that follow the Apostles' Creed at Morning Prayer (or Mattins) and Evening Prayer (or Evensong).

Many other litanies are used in private prayer. A Marian litany is one dedicated to the Blessed Virgin Mary; only one is authorised for public recitation (mentioned above).

==== Catholic litanies ====
In the Catholic Church, seven litanies are approved for public recitation:

- The Litany of the Holy Name of Jesus
- The Litany of the Sacred Heart of Jesus
- The Litany of the Most Precious Blood of Jesus
- The Litany of the Blessed Virgin Mary (also known as the Litany of Loreto)
- The Litany of Saint Joseph
- The Litany of the Saints
- The Litany (in Divine Worship: The Missal Appendix 8)

For all of them the 2004 Enchiridion Indulgentiarum grants the partial indulgence to the faithfuls of Christ who piously pray the Litanies.

Several others, including the Litany of the Blessed Sacrament, the Litany of the Passion, and the Litany of humility are approved for private devotion.

==== Lutheran litanies ====
Much of the historic Litany was retained by the Lutheran Church. Luther hailed it as one of the greatest Christian prayers ever. When faced with the Turkish armies at the gates of Vienna in 1528/29, Luther exhorted pastors to call their Christian people to repentance and prayer. He recommended the use of the Litany during the Sunday mass or Vespers. In 1529, he, after modifying the traditional Litany of the Saints (mostly by removing the invocation of saints and prayers for the pope), began using the Litany at Wittenberg in Latin and German. Thomas Cranmer used Luther's revised Litany as one of his main sources in the preparation of the Litany in the Book of Common Prayer. Today, a form of the Litany continues to be used in the various Lutheran Churches around the world.

==== Methodist litanies ====
The Methodist The Book of Worship for Church and Home (1965) contains the following litanies:

- The Litany of Recollection of Jesus
- The Litany on the Will of God
- The Litany of the Divine Will
- The Litany of Self-Examination
- The Litany of Confession
- The Litany of Supplication
- The Litany of Remembrance
- The Litany of Commemoration
- The Litany of Intercession
- The Litany for Peace

=== Eastern Christianity ===
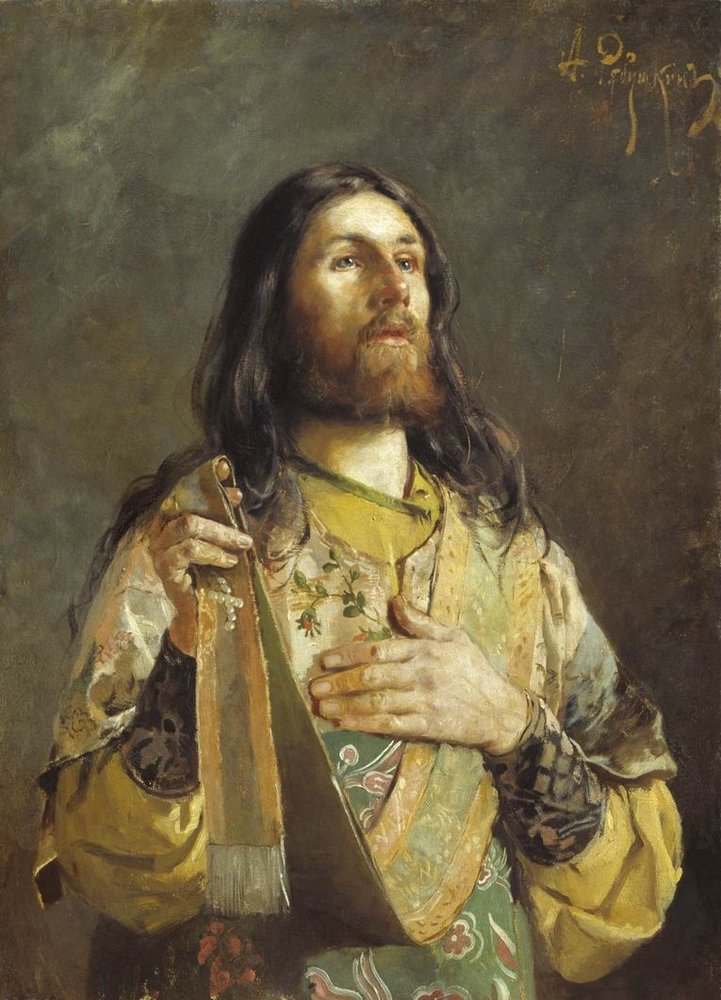
Andrei Ryabushkin's The Deacon (1888, Russian Museum, St. Petersburg). A deacon intones an ektenia clasping his orarion with the first three fingers of his right hand with which he makes the Sign of the Cross after each petition.

In the Eastern Orthodox and Byzantine Catholic churches, a litany is referred to as an ektenia. There are numerous ektenias during the Byzantine divine services: the Divine Liturgy, Vespers, Matins, the Sacraments, and numerous other services.

The petitions of the ektenias are usually chanted by a deacon (but if there is no deacon the priest will say the petitions), to each of which the choir (chanters) or congregation will respond. The response is usually Kyrie eleison ("Lord, have mercy"), but other responses are used at different ektenias. After the final petition, the priest makes the ekphonesis (exclamation) which summarizes the ektenia, and always involves an invocation of the Holy Trinity.

== Judaism ==
Although used to a much lesser extent in Jewish worship, litanies do appear in Jewish liturgy. The most notable examples are the Hoshanot recited in the additional (musaf) service during all seven days of the Sukkot festival. These are mostly alphabetical acrostics to which the refrain at the end of each line is "Hoshanah"!, a contraction of the biblical Hoshi'a na (Psalm 118:25), "Save us, please!" These are recited in a procession around the sanctuary, with congregants holding the lulav and etrog (the biblical "Four Species" of Leviticus 23:40). They are essentially prayers for rain.

Litanies are also recited during the Ten Days of Repentance. The most famous of these "supplicatory" prayers is Avinu Malkeinu ("Our Father, Our King"), which is recited during Rosh Hashanah and Yom Kippur liturgies. Certain Selichot prayers also take the form of a litany during the month of Elul, as do some prayers recited on fast days.

== Mandaeism ==
Litanies are often recited in Mandaeism. The most commonly recited Mandaean litanies are the Asut Malkia and Tabahatan.

== Islam ==
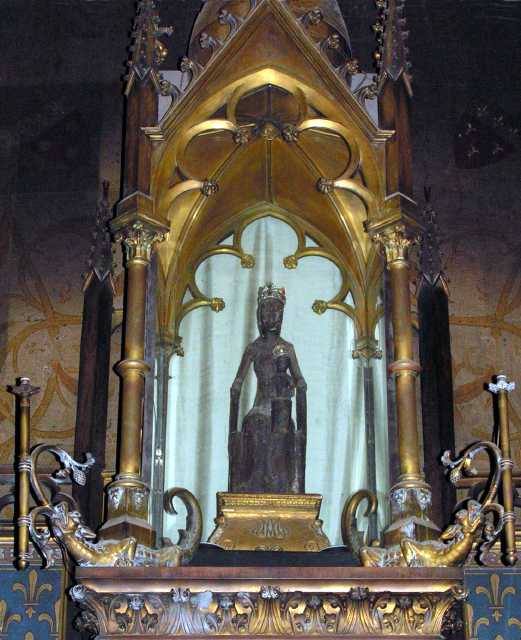
The statue of the venerated Black Virgin at Rocamadour

== Musical settings ==
- Marc-Antoine Charpentier, Litany of Loreto, 9 settings, H.82 (1680), H.83 (1683–85), H.84 (1690), H.85 (1688–90), H.86 (1690), H.87 (1690), H.88 (1690), H.89 (1690), H.90 (1690).
- Henry Dumont, Litany of Loreto (1652)
- František Ignac Tuma, Lytaniae Lauretanae (18. century)
- Karol Szymanowski, Litany to the Virgin Mary Op.59 (1933)
- Francis Poulenc, Litanies de la Vierge noir. He wrote in 1936 Litanies à la Vierge Noire (Litanies to the Black Virgin) after a pilgrimage to the shrine of Rocamadour, setting a French local pilgrimage litany.
- American rapper, singer, songwriter, and record producer Kanye West composed a litany in his song Water released on October 25, 2019.
- Kolbe Ensemble (hr) released Sung litanies of St. Anthony in 2022 in Croatian, inspired by Italian setting of All Saint's Litanies.

== See also ==
- Exhortation and Litany (1544)
- Litany against fear
- Litany of humility
- Litany of the Blessed Virgin Mary
- Lorica
