= Litany of humility =

Catholic prayer

The Litany of Humility is a Catholic prayer that the penitent be granted the virtue of humility. A litany is a form of prayer with a repeated responsive petition; it is not used in public liturgical services of the Catholic Church, but in private devotions of adherents.

This litany is commonly attributed to Cardinal Rafael Merry del Val (1865-1930), Cardinal Secretary of State of the Holy See under Pope Pius X. C. S. Lewis attributed its composition to Merry del Val in a March 1948 letter to Don Giovanni Calabria. Father Charles Belmonte was inspired by the writings of Merry del Val and included it in a collection, the Handbook of Prayers (Studium Theologiae Foundation, Manila, 1986, and in a later edition by Midwest Theological Forum, Chicago, US), and described it as "attributed to Card. Merry del Val". Subsequent copyists wrote simply: "by Card. Merry del Val".

A "Litany to Obtain Holy Humility" was published in 1867 by "A R.C. Clergyman". A version very similar to the version attributed to Cardinal Merry del Val was published in 1880, copyright 1879, and "translated from the French of the Fifth Edition." It appears Merry del Val was using a lesser known but already published prayer. The original author of the Litany of Humility is unknown.

A Ukrainian language version of the litany, attributed to the Russian Orthodox priest Alexander Men, appears in two prayer books: Molytovnyk Dl'a Rodyny (Prayer Book for the Family) published in L'viv in 2010 by Apriori; and Molytovnyk (Prayer Book), published in Kyiv in 2017 by Duh i Litera.

== Litany of Humility ==
=== Contemporary Version ===
Lord Jesus. Meek and humble of heart, Hear me.
From the desire of being esteemed, Deliver me, Jesus.
From the desire of being loved, Deliver me, Jesus.
From the desire of being extolled, Deliver me, Jesus.
From the desire of being honored, Deliver me, Jesus.
From the desire of being praised, Deliver me, Jesus.
From the desire of being preferred to others, Deliver me, Jesus.
From the desire of being consulted, Deliver me, Jesus.
From the desire of being approved, Deliver me, Jesus.
From the fear of being humiliated, Deliver me, Jesus.
From the fear of being despised, Deliver me, Jesus.
From the fear of suffering rebukes, Deliver me, Jesus.
From the fear of being calumniated, Deliver me, Jesus.
From the fear of being forgotten, Deliver me, Jesus.
From the fear of being ridiculed, Deliver me, Jesus.
From the fear of being wronged, Deliver me, Jesus.
From the fear of being suspected, Deliver me, Jesus.

That others may be loved more than I, Jesus, grant me the grace to desire it.
That others may be esteemed more than I, Jesus, grant me the grace to desire it.
That, in the opinion of the world, others may increase and I may decrease, Jesus, grant me the grace to desire it.
That others may be chosen and I set aside, Jesus, grant me the grace to desire it.
That others may be praised and I unnoticed, Jesus, grant me the grace to desire it.
That others may be preferred to me in everything, Jesus, grant me the grace to desire it.
That others may become holier than I, provided that I may become as holy as I should, Jesus, grant me the grace to desire it.

— Rafael Cardinal Merry del Val (1865-1930)

=== Litany to Obtain Holy Humility (1867) ===
Lord have mercy, etc,
Jesus meek and humble of Heart, listen to my prayers, etc.
From the desire of being esteemed, O Jesus, deliver me.
From the desire of being known, O Jesus, deliver me.
From the desire of being praised, O Jesus, deliver me.
From the desire of being honoured, O Jesus, deliver me.
From the desire of being preferred, O Jesus, deliver me.
From the desire of being consulted, O Jesus, deliver me.
From the desire of being approved, O Jesus, deliver me.
From the desire of being spared, O Jesus, deliver me.
From the fear of being humbled, O Jesus, deliver me.
From the fear of being despised, O Jesus, deliver me.
From the fear of being rebuked, O Jesus, deliver me.
From the fear of being calumniated, O Jesus, deliver me.
From the fear of being forgotten, O Jesus, deliver me.
From the fear of being reviled, O Jesus, deliver me.
From the fear of being ill-treated, O Jesus, deliver me.
From the fear of being injured, O Jesus, deliver me.
O Mary, Mother of the humble, pray for me.
St. Joseph, patron of the humble, pray for me.
St. Michael, who first crushed pride, pray for me.
St. Francis, imitator of a master meek and humble, pray for me.
All ye holy spirits sanctified by humility, pray for me.

PRAYER.

O sweet Jesus! meek and humble of Heart, make my heart like unto Thine, and give me the grace of final perseverance.
Amen.

— The Fervent Adorer: Or, Practice Of Perpetual Adoration Of The Sacred Heart Of Jesus, As Recommended by Blessed Margaret Mary Alacoque

=== Litany of Humility (1880) ===
O Jesus, meek and humble of heart!
Jesus, hear me.
From the desire of being esteemed, Deliver me, Jesus.
From the desire of being loved, Deliver me, Jesus.
From the desire of being sought, Deliver me, Jesus.
From the desire of being honored, Deliver me, Jesus.
From the desire of being praised, Deliver me, Jesus.
From the desire of being preferred, Deliver me, Jesus.
From the desire of being consulted, Deliver me, Jesus.
From the desire of being approved, Deliver me, Jesus,
From the desire of being considered, Deliver me, Jesus,
From the fear of being humbled, Deliver me, Jesus.
From the fear of being despised, Deliver me, Jesus.
From the fear of being rebuffed, Deliver me, Jesus.
From the fear of being calumniated, Deliver me, Jesus.
From the fear of being forgotten, Deliver me, Jesus.
From the fear of being ridiculed, Deliver me, Jesus.
From the fear of being wronged, Deliver me, Jesus.
From the fear of being suspected, Deliver me, Jesus.
That others may be loved more than I, Jesus, grant me the grace to wish.
That others may be esteemed more than I, Jesus, grant me the grace to wish.
That others may grow in the opinion of the world and I diminish, Jesus, grant me the grace to wish.
That others may be employed and I set aside, Jesus, grant me the grace to wish.
That others may be praised and I forgotten, Jesus, grant me the grace to wish.
That others may be preferred before me in everything, Jesus, grant me the grace to wish.
That others may be more holy than I, provided I am as holy as I can be, Jesus, grant me the grace to wish.

== See also ==
- List of prayers
- Litany
