= Litany of Saint Joseph =

Prayer dedicated to Saint Joseph

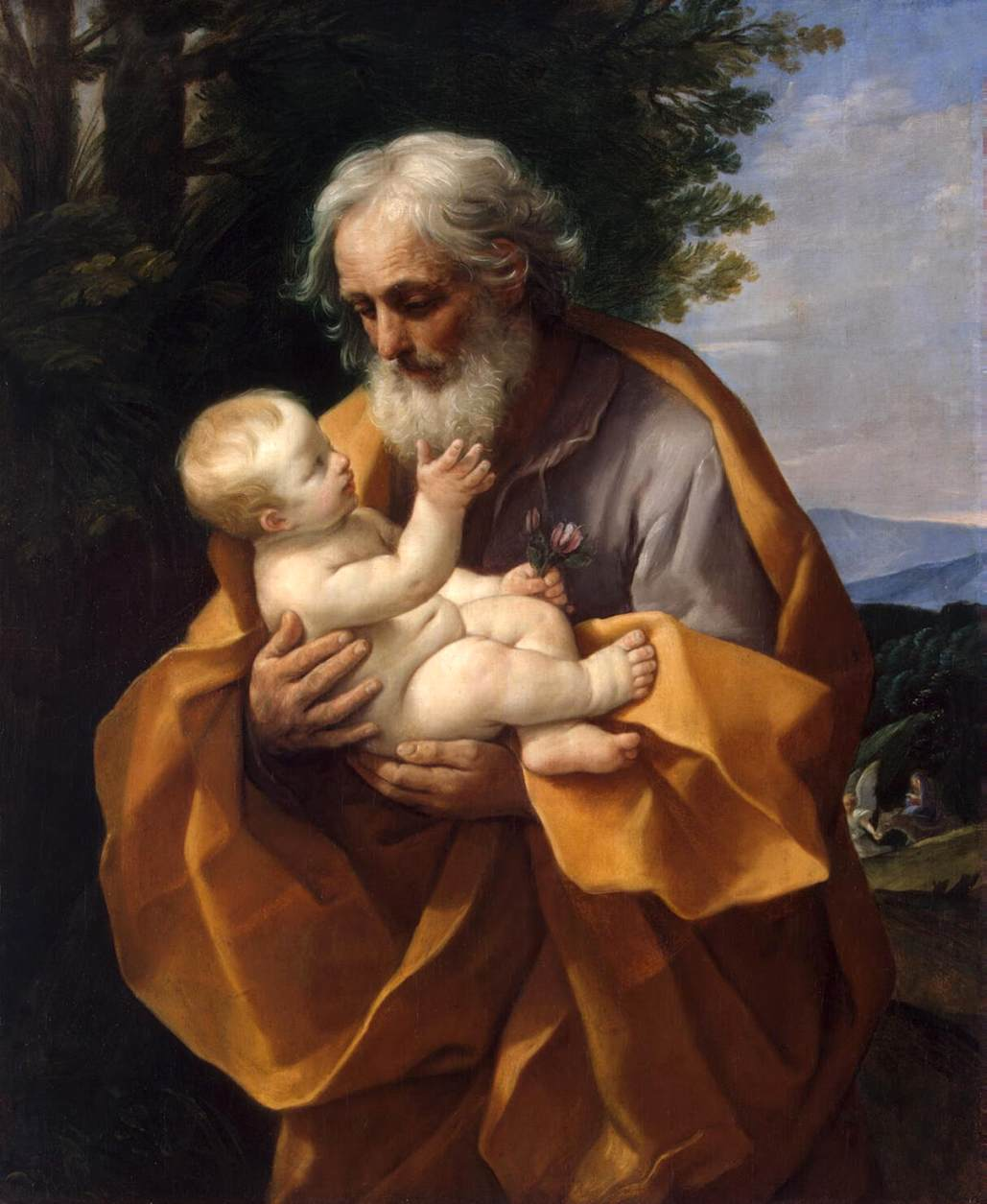
St Joseph with the Infant Jesus

The Litany of Saint Joseph (Latin: Litaniae Sancti Ioseph) is a formal prayer in the Catholic Church dedicated to Saint Joseph, the Prince and Patron of the Universal Church. It is one of six litanies approved by the Catholic Church for public and private use. The Litany of Saint Joseph was approved for public use by Pope Pius X in 1909. Praying the Litany of Saint Joseph grants partial indulgence.

== The Litany ==
The Litany of Saint Joseph was translated in the English form as:
Lord, have mercy.
Christ, have mercy.
Lord, have mercy.
Christ, hear us.
Christ, graciously hear us.

God, the Father of Heaven, have mercy on us.
God the Son, Redeemer of the world, have mercy on us.
God the Holy Spirit, have mercy on us.
Holy Trinity, One God, have mercy on us.

Holy Mary, pray for us (after each line)
Saint Joseph,
Renowned offspring of David,
Light of Patriarchs,
Spouse of the Mother of God,
Chaste guardian of the Virgin,
Foster-father of the Son of God,
Diligent protector of Christ,
Head of the Holy Family,
Joseph most just,
Joseph most chaste,
Joseph most prudent,
Joseph most strong,
Joseph most obedient,
Joseph most faithful,
Mirror of patience,
Lover of poverty,
Model of artisans,
Glory of home life,
Guardian of virgins,
Pillar of families,
Solace of the wretched,
Hope of the sick,
Patron of the dying,
Terror of demons,
Protector of Holy Church,

Lamb of God, who take away the sins of the world,
Spare us, O Lord.
Lamb of God, who take away the sins of the world,
Graciously hear us, O Lord.
Lamb of God, who take away the sins of the world,
Have mercy on us.

V. He made him the lord of His house:
R. And ruler of all His substance.

Let us pray.
O God, who in Thine unspeakable providence didst vouchsafe to choose blessed Joseph to be the spouse of Thine own most holy Mother: grant, we beseech Thee, that we may deserve to have him for our intercessor in heaven, whom we reverence as our defender on earth: who livest and reignest world without end. Amen.

== Indulgence ==
The 2004 Enchiridion Indulgentiarum grants the partial indulgence to the faithfuls of Christ who piously pray the Litanies.

== See also ==
- Prayer in the Catholic Church
- Litanies
