= Stradanus engraving =

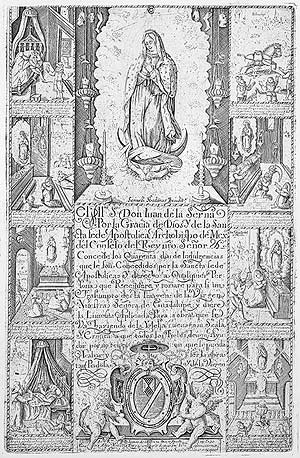
A 1948 reproduction printed from the Stradanus engraving.

The Stradanus engraving is a 1615 or 1621 (depending on the source) engraving that was used to print certificates of indulgences of forty days' remission of sins from Juan Pérez de la Serna, then Archbishop of Mexico. The certificates were given to people who donated money to finance the construction of the new sanctuary of Tepeyac, consecrated in 1622, which later became the Basilica of Guadalupe. Its actual title is Virgen de Guadalupe con escenas de ocho milagros (Spanish: Virgin of Guadalupe with scenes of eight miracles), but the term "Stradanus engraving" is used by Guadalupan researchers.

The plate was engraved by Samuel Stradanus [wd] of Antwerp (“Stradanus” is a Latinization of Flemish “van der Straet”), who also provided engravings for the publication of Pedro de Moya's 1622 Sanctum provinciale concilium mexici (Latin: Holy council of the province of Mexico), the decrees of the 1585 Third Mexican Council. It is the first document to depict the apparition of the Virgin of Guadalupe, and may have been a source of the Nican motecpana, the portion of the Huei tlamahuiçoltica, an early source of the Guadalupan apparition, that relates the miracles associated with the icon.

The granting of indulgences for cash was (since at least 1567) not supposed to be allowed by the church.
