= Little Office of the Passion =

The Little Office of the Passion refers to a devotional office created by Francis of Assisi as a complement to the Divine Office of the Roman Catholic Church.

== Organization ==
=== Order ===
The Little Office of the Passion is organized in a way reminiscent of the Liturgy of the Hours. It begins with the Our Father followed by the Glory Be. After these, a series of praises composed by Francis of Assisi is recited. Then the appropriate psalm is read, framed by an antiphon to the Blessed Virgin Mary also composed by Francis. After the psalm is read and the antiphon is repeated, a dismissal concludes the Office.

- Our Father
- Glory Be
- Praises
- Antiphon
- Psalm
- Antiphon
- Dismissal

The text of the praises is as follows:

Holy, holy, holy Lord God Almighty,

who is and who was and who is to come Let us praise and glorify him above all forever.

Lord our God, you are worthy to receive praise and glory and honor and blessing Let us praise and glorify him above all forever. The Lamb who was slain is worthy to receive power and divinity and wisdom and strength, and honor and glory and blessing Let us praise and glorify him above all forever.

Let us bless the Father and the Son with the Holy Spirit: Let us praise and glorify him above all forever.

Bless the Lord, all you works of the Lord Let us praise and glorify him above all forever.

Sing praise to our God, all you his servants and you who fear God, the small and the great. Let us praise and glorify him above all forever.

Let heaven and earth praise him who is glorious Let us praise and glorify him above all forever.

And every creature that is in heaven and on earth and under earth and in the sea and those which are in them. Let us praise and glorify him above all forever.

Glory to the Father and to the Son and to the Holy Spirit: Let us praise and glorify him above all forever.

As it was in the beginning, is now, and will be forever. Amen. Let us praise and glorify him above all forever.

Let us pray

All-powerful, most holy, most high, and supreme God: all good, supreme good, totally good, You who alone are good; May we give you all praise, all glory, all thanks, all honor: all blessing, and all good things. So be it. So be it. Amen.

The text of the antiphon:

Holy Virgin Mary, among women,

there is no one like you born into the world: you are the daughter and the servant of the most high and supreme King and Father of heaven, you are the mother of our most holy Lord Jesus Christ, you are the spouse of the Holy Spirit. Pray for us with Saint Michael the Archangel and all the powers of the heavens and all the saints to your most holy beloved Son, the Lord and Master. Glory to the Father and to the Son and to the Holy Spirit. As it was in the beginning, is now, and will be forever. Amen.

=== The Passion of Jesus ===
The Little Office of the Passion follows a pattern constructed by Francis of Assisi. He ordered this office around the medieval association of five specific moments in Jesus' Passion with specific hours of the day. Having then attributed these to hours of the Divine Office (This Little Office being recited following the Canonical Office), he arrived at this schema:

- Compline - 21:00 - Jesus' Arrest on the Mount of Olives
- Lauds (preceded by Matins) - 00:00 - Jesus' Trial before the Jewish Sanhedrin
- Prime - 06:00 - "an interlude celebrating Christ as the light of the new day"
- Terce - 09:00 - Jesus' Trial before Pontius Pilate
- Sext - 12:00 - Jesus' Crucifixion
- None - 15:00 - Jesus' Death
- Vespers - 18:00 - "recalling and celebrating the entire daily cycle"

== Psalms ==
The Psalms used in the Little Office of the Passion are not individual psalms from the Hebrew Scriptures, but are collages constructed by Francis of Assisi by taking passages from canticles, psalms, liturgical texts, and other sources to paint pictures of the scenes from the Passion of Jesus.

=== Sequences of the Office ===
The Psalms are organized into five sequences corresponding to the Liturgical Year of the Roman Catholic Church. The sequences are as follows:

	I (Lent, Triduum, Ordinary Time)	II (Easter)	III (Sundays, Solemnities)	IV (Advent)	V (Christmastide)
Compline	1	8	8	13	15
Lauds	2	9	9	14	15
Prime	3	3	3	3	15
Terce	4	9	10	10	15
Sext	5	9	11	11	15
None	6	9	12	12	15
Vespers	7	7	7	7	15

=== Psalm texts ===
The texts of the Psalms are as follow:

Psalm 1

God, I have told you of my life

you have placed my tears in your sight (Ps 55:8b-9). All my enemies were planning evil things against me (Ps 40:8a) and they have taken counsel together (cf. Ps 70:10c).

They repaid me evil for you and hatred for my love (cf. Ps 108:5). In return for my love they slandered me but I kept praying (Ps 108:4).

My holy Father (Jn 17:11), King of heaven and earth, do not leave me since trouble is near and there is no one to help (Ps 21:12). Let my enemies be turned back on whatever day I shall call upon You; for now I know that You are my God (Ps 55:10).

My friends and my neighbors have drawn near and have stood against me and those who were close to me have stayed far away (Ps 37:12). You have driven my acquaintances far from me they have made me an abomination to them, I have been handed over and I have not fled! (Ps 87:9).

Holy Father (Jn 17:11), do not remove your help from me (Ps 21:20); my God, look to my assistance (cf. Ps 70:12). Come to my help Lord, God of my salvation (Ps 37:23).

Glory to the Father and to the Son and to the Holy Spirit. As it was in the beginning, is now, and will be forever. Amen.

Psalm 2

Lord, God of my salvation

I cry to you by day and by night (Ps 87:2). Let my prayer enter into your sight incline Your ear to my prayer (Ps 87:3).

Look to my soul and free it ransom me from my enemies (Ps 68:19). Since it is you who drew me out of the womb, you, my hope from my mother's breasts, I am cast upon you from the womb (Ps 21:10).

From the womb of my mother you are my God do not depart from me (Ps 21:11). You know my disgrace, and my confusion, and my shame (Ps 68:20).

All those who trouble me are in Your sight and my heart has expected abuse and misery (Ps 68:2la-b). And I looked for someone who would grieve together with me and there was none and for someone who would console me and I found none (Ps 68:21 c-d).

O God, the wicked have risen against me and they have sought my life in the assembly of the mighty and they have not placed you in their sight (Ps 85:14). I am numbered among those who go down into the pit; I have become as a man without help, free among the dead (Ps 87:5-6a).

You are my most holy Father my King and my God (cf. Ps 43:5a). Come to my help Lord, God of my salvation (Ps 37:23).

Glory to the Father and to the Son and to the Holy Spirit. As it was in the beginning, is now, and will be forever. Amen.

Psalm 3

Have mercy on me, O God, have mercy on me

since my soul places its trust in you (Ps 56:2a). And I will hope as I stay under the shadow of your wings until wickedness passes by (Ps 56:2b).

I will cry to my most holy Father, the most high, to the Lord, who has done good to me (cf. Ps 56:3). He has sent from heaven and delivered me He has disgraced those who have trampled upon me (Ps 56:4a-b).

God has sent his mercy and his truth He has snatched my life (Ps 56:4c-5a) from the strongest of my enemies and from those who hated me since they were too strong for me (Ps 17:18).

They have prepared a trap for my feet and have bowed down my soul (Ps 56:7a-b). They have dug a pit before my face and themselves have fallen into it (Ps 56:7c-d).

My heart is ready, O God, my heart is ready I will sing and recite a psalm (Ps 56:8). Arise, my glory, arise psalter and harp, I will arise at dawn (Ps 56:9).

I will praise You among the peoples, O Lord, I will say a psalm to you among the nations (Ps 56:10). Since your mercy is exalted even to the skies and your truth even to the clouds (Ps 56:11).

Be exalted above the heavens, O God, and may your glory be above all the earth! (Ps 56:12).

Glory to the Father and to the Son and to the Holy Spirit. As it was in the beginning, is now, and will be forever. Amen.

Psalm 4

Have mercy on me, O God,

for man has trampled me underfoot all the day long they have afflicted me and they fight against me (Ps 55:2).

My enemies trample upon me all the day long since those who wage war against me are many (Ps 55:3). All my enemies have been thinking evil things against me they set an evil plan against me (Ps 40:8b-9a).

Those who guarded my life have conspired together (Ps 70:10b). They went forth and spoke together (Ps 40:7).

All those who see me laugh at me and they have spoken with their lips and have shaken their heads (Ps 21:8).

I am a worm and no man, the scorn of men and the outcast of the people (Ps 21:7). I have been made a reproach to my neighbors exceeding all of my enemies and a fear for my acquaintances (Ps 30:12a-b).

O holy Father (Jn 17:11), do not keep your help from me but look to my defense (Ps 21:20). Come to my help, Lord, God of my salvation (Ps 37:23).

Glory to the Father and to the Son and to the Holy Spirit. As it was in the beginning, is now, and will be forever. Amen.

Psalm 5

I cried to the Lord with my voice

with my voice I made supplication to the Lord (Ps 141:2). I pour out my prayer in his sight and I speak of my trouble before him (Ps 141:3).

When my spirit failed me you knew my ways (Ps 141:4a-b). On the path on which I walked the proud have hidden a trap for me (Ps 141:4c-d).

I looked to my right and I saw and there was no one who knew me (Ps 141:5a-b). I have no means of escape and there is no one who cares for my life (Ps 141:5c-d).

Because of you I have sustained abuse while confusion covers my face (Ps 68:8). I have been made an outcast to my brothers and a stranger to the children of my mother (Ps 68:9).

Holy Father (Jn 17:11), zeal for your house has consumed me and the abuses of those who have attacked you have fallen upon me (Ps 68:10).

And against me they have rejoiced and have united together and many scourges were heaped upon me and I knew not why (Ps 34:15).

More numerous than the hairs of my head are those who hate me without cause (Ps 68:5a-b). Those who persecute me unjustly, my enemies, have been strengthened must I then restore what I did not steal? (Ps 68:5c-d).

The wicked witnesses who rise up have interrogated me about things of which I am ignorant (Ps 34:11).

They repaid me evil for good (Ps 34:12a) and they harassed me because I pursued good (Ps 37:21).

You are my most holy Father my King and my God (Ps 43:5). Come to my help, Lord, God of my salvation (Ps 37:23).

Glory to the Father and to the Son and to the Holy Spirit. As it was in the beginning, is now, and will be forever. Amen.

Psalm 6

O all of you who pass along the way

look and see if there is any sorrow like my sorrow (Lm 1:12a—b). For many dogs have surrounded me a pack of evildoers has closed in on me (Ps 21:17).

They have looked and stared upon me they have divided my garments among them and for my tunic they have cast lots (Ps 21:18b—19).

They have pierced my hands and my feet they have numbered all my bones (Ps 21:17c—18a). They have opened their mouth against me like a lion raging and roaring (Ps 21:14).

I am poured out like water and all of my bones have been scattered (Ps 21:15a—b). And my heart has become like melting wax in the midst of my bosom (Ps 21:15c).

My strength is dried up liked baked clay and my tongue clings to my jaws (Ps 21:16a-b). And they have given gall as my food and in my thirst they gave me vinegar to drink (Ps 68:22).

And they have led me into the dust of death (cf. Ps 21:16c) and they have added grief to my wounds (Ps 68:27b). I have slept and have risen (Ps 3:6) and my most holy Father has received me with glory (cf. Ps 72:24c).

Holy Father (Jn 17:11), you have held my right hand and you have led me with your counsel (Ps 72:24). For what is there in heaven for me and besides you what do I want on earth (Ps 72:25)?

See, see that I am God, says the Lord I shall be exalted among the nations and I shall be exalted on the earth (cf. Ps 45:11).

Blessed be the Lord, the God of Israel (Lk 1:68a), who has redeemed the souls of his servants with his very own most holy Blood and who will not abandon all who hope in him (Ps 33:23).

And we know, for he comes, for he will come to judge justice (cf. Ps 95:13b).

Glory to the Father and to the Son and to the Holy Spirit. As it was in the beginning, is now, and will be forever. Amen.

Psalm 7

All you nations clap your hands

shout to God with a voice of gladness (Ps 46:2). For the Lord, the Most High the awesome, is the great King over all the earth (Ps 46:3).

For the most holy Father of heaven, our King before all ages, has sent his beloved Son from on high and has brought salvation in the midst of the earth (Ps 73:12).

Let the heavens be glad and let the earth rejoice, let the sea and all that is in it be moved let the fields and all that is in them be joyful (Ps 95:11—12a).

Sing a new song to Him sing to the Lord, all the earth (cf. Ps 95:1)! For the Lord is great and highly to be praised, and awesome is He beyond all gods (Ps 95:4)!

Give to the Lord, you families of nations, give to the Lord glory and honor, give to the Lord the glory due his name (Ps 95:7-8a).

Offer up your bodies and take up his holy cross and follow his most holy commands even to the end (cf. Lk 14:27; 1 Pet 2:21).

Let the whole earth tremble before his face say among the nations that the Lord has ruled from a tree (Ps 95:9b-10a).

On Ascension, the following is added:

And he ascended into heaven and is seated at the right hand of the most holy Father in heaven; O God, be exalted above the heavens and above all the earth be your glory (Ps 56:12).

And we know that he has come

that he will come to judge justice.

Glory to the Father and to the Son and to the Holy Spirit. As it was in the beginning, is now, and will be forever. Amen.

Psalm 8

God, come to my assistance

Lord, make haste to help me.

Let them be put to shame and confounded who seek my life. Let them be put to flight and disgraced who rejoice at my misfortune.

Let them be turned back in shame who say to me: Aha! Aha! May all those who seek you exult and be glad in you and may those who love Your salvation ever say: "May God be glorified!"

But I am afflicted and poor: help me, O God. You are my help and my deliverer Lord, do not delay (Ps 69:2-6).

Glory to the Father and to the Son and to the Holy Spirit. As it was in the beginning, is now, and will be forever. Amen.

Psalm 9

Sing to the Lord a new song

for he has done wondrous deeds (Ps 97:1a-b).

His right hand and his holy arm (Ps 97:1c-d) have sacrificed His beloved Son.

The Lord has made His salvation known in the sight of the nations He has revealed His justice (Ps 97:2).

On that day the Lord sent his mercy, and his song at night (cf. Ps 41:9a-b).

This is the day the Lord has made let us rejoice and be glad in it (Ps 117:24).

Blessed is he who comes in the name of the Lord the Lord is God, and he has given us light (Ps 117:26a, 27a).

Let the heavens be glad and the earth rejoice, let the sea and all that is in it be moved let the fields be joyful and all that is in them (Ps 95:11—12a).

Give to the Lord, you families of nations, give to the Lord glory and praise give to the Lord the glory due his name (Ps 95:7-8a).

Sing to the Lord, O kingdoms of the earth, sing to the Lord (Ps 67:33a). Chant praise to God who ascends above the heights of the heavens to the east (Ps 67:33b-34a).

Look, he will give his voice, the voice of power;

give glory to God!

Above Israel is his greatness, and his power is in the skies (Ps 67:34b-35).

God is marvelous in his holy ones the God of Israel himself will give power and strength to his people. Blessed be God (Ps 67:36)!

Glory to the Father, and to the Son, and to the Holy Spirit. As it was in the beginning, is now and will be forever. Amen.

Glory to the Father and to the Son and to the Holy Spirit. As it was in the beginning, is now, and will be forever. Amen.

Psalm 10

Cry out to the Lord with joy, all the earth!

Speak praise to his name give glory to his praise (cf. Ps 65:1-2).

Say to God: How terrifying are your deeds, Lord, in the vastness of your strength your enemies shall fawn upon you (Ps 65:3).

Let all the earth adore you and sing praise to you let us sing praise to your name (Ps 65:4). Come, listen, and I will tell all of you who fear God how much he has done for my soul (Ps 65:16).

To him I cried with my mouth and sounds of music were on my tongue (Ps 65:17). And from his holy temple he heard my voice and my cry reached his ears (Ps 17:7c-d).

Bless our Lord, you peoples and make the voice of his praise be heard (cf. Ps 65:8). And all the tribes of the earth shall be blessed in him all the nations shall proclaim him (Ps 71:17c—d).

Blessed be the Lord, the God of Israel Who alone does marvelous and] great deeds (Ps 71:18). And blessed forever be the name of his majesty and may all the earth be filled with his majesty. (Ps 71:19).

Amen! Amen!

Glory to the Father and to the Son and to the Holy Spirit. As it was in the beginning, is now, and will be forever. Amen.

Psalm 11

May the Lord hear you on the day of distress

may the name of the God of Jacob protect you (Ps 19:2).

May he send you help from his sanctuary and from Zion may he sustain you (Ps 19:3).

May he remember all of your sacrifices and may your burnt offering be fruitful (Ps 19:4).

May he grant you what your heart desires and may he fulfill your every plan (Ps 19:5).

May we rejoice in your victory and may we be victorious in the name of the Lord our God (Ps 19:6).

May the Lord fulfill all of your requests (Ps 19:6)!

Now I know that (Ps 19:7a-b) the Lord sent His Son Jesus Christ and he will judge the peoples with justice (Ps 9:9b).

And the Lord has become the refuge of the poor, a stronghold in times of distress Let them trust in you who know your name (Ps 9:10-1 la).

Blessed be the Lord my God (Ps 143:1b) since he has become my stronghold and my refuge in the day of my distress (cf. Ps 58:17c-d).

My helper, I will praise you, for you, God, are my stronghold and my God, my mercy! (Ps 58:18).

Glory to the Father and to the Son and to the Holy Spirit. As it was in the beginning, is now, and will be forever. Amen.

Psalm 12

In you, Lord, I have hoped,

let me never be put to shame; in your fidelity, deliver me and rescue me (Ps 70:lb-2a). Incline your ear to me; save me (Ps 70:2b).

Be my protector, O God, and a stronghold that You may save me (Ps 70:3a-b). For you are my patience, Lord, You are my hope, Lord, from my youth (Ps 70:5).

In you I have been supported from birth; from my mother's womb you are my protector and of you my song will always be (Ps 70:6). May my mouth be filled with praise that I may sing of your glory and all the day long of your greatness (Ps 70:8).

Answer me, Lord, for your mercy is kind look upon me out of the vastness of your mercies (Ps 68:17). And hide not your face from your servant; because I am in distress, make haste quickly to answer me (Ps 68:18).

Blessed be the Lord my God (Ps 143:1b), for he has become my protector and my refuge on the day of my distress.

O my helper, your praises will I sing, for God is my protector, my God, my mercy (Ps 58:18).

Glory to the Father and to the Son and to the Holy Spirit. As it was in the beginning, is now, and will be forever. Amen.

Psalm 13

How long, Lord, will you eternally forget me?

How long will you turn your face from me? How long must I place doubts in my soul sorrow in my heart each day?

How long will my enemy rejoice over me? Look, and hear me, O Lord, my God. Give light to my eyes that I may never sleep in death that my enemy may never say: I have overcome him.

Those who trouble me would rejoice if I stumbled but I have trusted in your kindness. My heart shall rejoice in your saving help;

I will sing to the Lord who has given good things to me and I will praise the name of the Lord most high (Ps 12:1-6).

Glory to the Father and to the Son and to the Holy Spirit. As it was in the beginning, is now, and will be forever. Amen.

Psalm 14

I will praise you, Lord, most holy Father,

King of heaven and earth, for You have consoled me (cf. Is 12:1).

You are God my Savior; I will act confidently and not be afraid (Is 12:2a-b). The Lord is my strength and my glory; He has become my salvation (Is 12:2c-d).

Your right hand, O Lord, is magnificent in strength; Your right hand, O Lord, has shattered the enemy, and in the vastness of your glory you have overthrown my enemies (Ex 15:6-7a).

Let the poor see [this] and be glad seek God and your soul shall live (Ps 68:33). Let heaven and earth praise him the sea and every living thing in them (Ps 68:35).

For God will save Zion and the cities of Judah will be rebuilt (Ps 68:36a-b). And they shall dwell there and they shall acquire it as their inheritance (Ps 68:36c).

And the descendants of his servants shall possess it and those who love his name shall dwell in it (Ps 68:37).

Glory to the Father and to the Son and to the Holy Spirit. As it was in the beginning, is now, and will be forever. Amen.

Psalm 15

Ring out your joy to God our help

and shout with cries of gladness to the Lord God living and true (cf. Ps 46:2b).

For the Lord, the most high, the awesome, is the great king over all the earth (Ps 46:3).

For the most holy Father of heaven, our King before all ages (Ps 73:12a), has sent his beloved Son from on high and he was born of the Blessed Virgin Holy Mary.

He called upon me: You are my Father (Ps 88:27a), and I will enthrone Him as the firstborn, the highest, above the kings of the earth (Ps 88:28).

On that day the Lord sent his mercy and at night his song was heard (Ps 41:9a-b).

This is the day the Lord has made let us rejoice and be glad in it (Ps 117:24).

For the most holy beloved child was given to us, and he was born for us (cf. Is 9:5) along the way and placed in a manger since there was no room in the inn (cf. Lk 2:7).

Glory to the Lord God in the highest and on earth peace to men of good will (cf. Lk 2:14). Let the heavens be glad and the earth rejoice, let the sea and all that is in it be moved

let the fields and everything that is in them be joyful (Ps 95:11- 12a). Sing a new song to him sing to the Lord, all the earth (cf. Ps 95:1).

For the Lord is great and worthy of all praise He is awesome, beyond all gods (Ps 95:4)!

Give to the Lord, you families of nations, give to the Lord glory and praise give to the Lord the glory due His name (Ps 95:7-8a).

Offer your bodies and take up His holy cross and follow his most holy commands even to the end (cf. Lk 14-27; 1 Pet 2:21).

Glory to the Father and to the Son and to the Holy Spirit. As it was in the beginning, is now, and will be forever. Amen.
