= Holy actions =

Holy actions are when Roman Catholics offer their work, prayers, apostolic undertakings, daily works, hardships of life, relaxations of body and mind, and family and marriage lives to the Lord, in union with the Holy Sacrifice of the Mass, in the Spirit of Love.

== Intentions ==
Usually, the spiritual sacrifices are made with intentions in mind, such as "for the intentions of the Pope" or "for the unity of Christians". In reality, these offerings can be made for whatever good intentions that Christians bear in mind.

== Purpose ==
By their holy actions, Christians share in the priestly office of Jesus Christ, fulfill the call to holiness, consecrate the world to God, and hasten the Second Coming of the Lord.

== Holy actions and the prophetic and kingly offices of Christ ==
In light of their share in the priestly office of Christ, Christians also share in the prophetic office and the kingly office of Christ. By their holy lives, Christians evangelize in the ordinary circumstances of the world and overcome the reign of sin in themselves.

== Holy actions and the Divine Office ==
According to Sacred Tradition, Christians unite their offerings to the Liturgy of the Hours, if they do not already pray the Divine Office, because the Liturgy of the Hours is the Prayer of the Catholic Church, by which the night and day are made holy, which is the end of holy actions.

== Example of an offering ==
One popular example of an offering is that of the Daily Offering of the Apostolate of Prayer. While the Offering has gone through many recent changes, for various reasons, it is the traditional Offering that is the most well-known and prayed.

O Jesus, through the Immaculate Heart of Mary, I offer you all my works, prayers, joys, and sufferings, in union with the Holy Sacrifice of the Mass, celebrated throughout the world, for love of you, for the intentions of your Sacred Heart, in reparation for my sins, for all the intentions of our associations, and, in particular, for the intentions of the Pope. Amen.

== See also ==
- Christian devotional literature
- Efficacy of prayer
- Prayer in the New Testament
- Christian prayer
- Prayer in the Catholic Church
- Catholic prayers to Jesus
- Universal call to holiness
