= Haurietis aquas =

1956 encyclical on the Sacred Heart

Haurietis aquas Latin for 'You will draw waters' Encyclical of Pope Pius XII
- Signature date: 15 May 1956
- Number: 32 of 41 of the pontificate
- Text: In Latin; In English

Haurietis aquas (English: "You will draw waters") is an encyclical of Pope Pius XII on devotion to the Sacred Heart of Jesus. It was published on May 15, 1956, to commemorate the 100th anniversary of the establishment of the feast of the Sacred Heart of Jesus by Pope Pius IX.

The title is derived from Isaiah 12:3.

== Authorship ==
Augustin Bea, a close associate of Pope Pius XII, is widely believed to have contributed to preparing the document, particularly the biblical references.

== Content ==
The encyclical begins with an introduction giving an overall view of the devotion, and recalls previous papal teachings. Pius XII stated two reasons why the Church gives the highest form of worship to the Heart of Jesus. The first rests on the principle whereby the believers recognise that Jesus' Heart is hypostatically united to the "Person of the Incarnate Son of God Himself". The second reason is derived from the fact that the Heart is the natural sign and symbol of Jesus' boundless love for humanity. The Pope describes the devotion as "theologically sound and spiritually profitable as well as fundamentally ancient and traditional in the Church". For those who would characterize Devotion to the Sacred Heart as superstitious or sentimental, he quotes Pope Pius XI:

"The veneration of the Sacred Heart is a summary of all our religion and, moreover, a guide to a more perfect life. It more easily leads our minds to know Christ the Lord intimately and more effectively turns our hearts to love Him more ardently and to imitate Him more perfectly".

Haurietis aquas "...was concerned to overcome the dangerous dualism between liturgical spirituality and nineteenth century devotion, to let each of them stimulate the other to bring forth fruit, to bring them into a fruitful relationship without simply dissolving the one in the other."

Devotion to the Sacred Heart can be expressed in a number of practices, such as a Holy Hour, the Litany of the Sacred Heart of Jesus, participation in Mass on the First Fridays, etc. "One of the merits of the Haurietis aquas encyclical was precisely that of helping set all these elements in their biblical context and above all of highlighting the deep meaning of this devotion, that is the love of God, who loves the world from all eternity and has given his Son for it (John 3, 16; cf. Rm 8, 32, etc.)".

Pius refuted objections that the devotion encouraged a passive attitude at the expense of helping one’s neighbor. "After 50 years", celebrating the encyclical's anniversary, Pope Benedict XVI noted that "by encouraging devotion to the Heart of Jesus, the encyclical Haurietis aquas exhorted believers to open themselves to the mystery of God and of his love and to allow themselves to be transformed by it".

== See also ==
- Miserentissimus Redemptor
- Quas primas
- Act of Consecration to the Sacred Heart of Jesus
