= Dilexit nos =

2024 encyclical of Pope Francis

Dilexit nos Latin for 'He Loved Us' Encyclical of Pope Francis
- Signature date: 24 October 2024
- Subject: On the human and divine love of the Heart of Jesus Christ
- Number: 4 of 4 of the pontificate
- Text: In Latin; In English

Dilexit nos (lit. 'He loved us') is the fourth and last encyclical of Pope Francis, subtitled "On the human and divine love of the Heart of Jesus Christ".

== Background ==
Pope Francis had announced in June 2024 that he would publish a document dedicated to the Sacred Heart devotion, and it was published on 24 October 2024.

Dilexit nos follows a line of papal encyclicals entirely dedicated to the Sacred Heart, notably Pope Leo XIII's 1899 encyclical letter Annum sacrum, Pope Pius XI's 1928 Miserentissimus Redemptor, and Pope Pius XII's 1956 Haurietis aquas.

== Contents ==
As a Jesuit himself, Francis reflects on the significance of devotion to the Sacred Heart within Jesuit spirituality and, in a footnote, he cites as inspiration the unpublished writings of Diego Fares, an Argentine Jesuit for whom Francis had served as rector, formator, and spiritual director.

Similar to previous encyclicals, in Dilexit nos Pope Francis criticises modern phenomena, such as individualism, social and economic disparities, and "uses of technology that threaten our humanity", and calls for rediscovery of "heart" as a way towards unity, peace, and reconciliation in the modern era.

There are five sections to the encyclical: initially, a philosophical and theological survey of "the heart", followed by reflections on Jesus' actions and words of love, and an account of the theological meaning of Sacred Heart devotion. The opening of the encyclical picks up New Testament references to Christ's love for "us" taken from the Gospel of John, the First Epistle of John and the Apostle Paul's Epistle to the Romans.

Further sections on the "spiritual dynamics and social implications" of the teaching follow.

The encyclical has been described as less directly focused on political or social issues and more spiritual than its predecessors, Laudato si' and Fratelli tutti. However, Archbishop Bruno Forte of the Dicastery for the Doctrine of the Faith, who introduced the encyclical at a press conference, described it as relevant to the "dramatic challenges of the present time".
