= First Friday =

First Friday may refer to:

- First Friday Devotions, a Catholic Devotion
- First Friday (public event) in some cities of the USA;
