= Holy Hour =

Roman Catholic devotional tradition

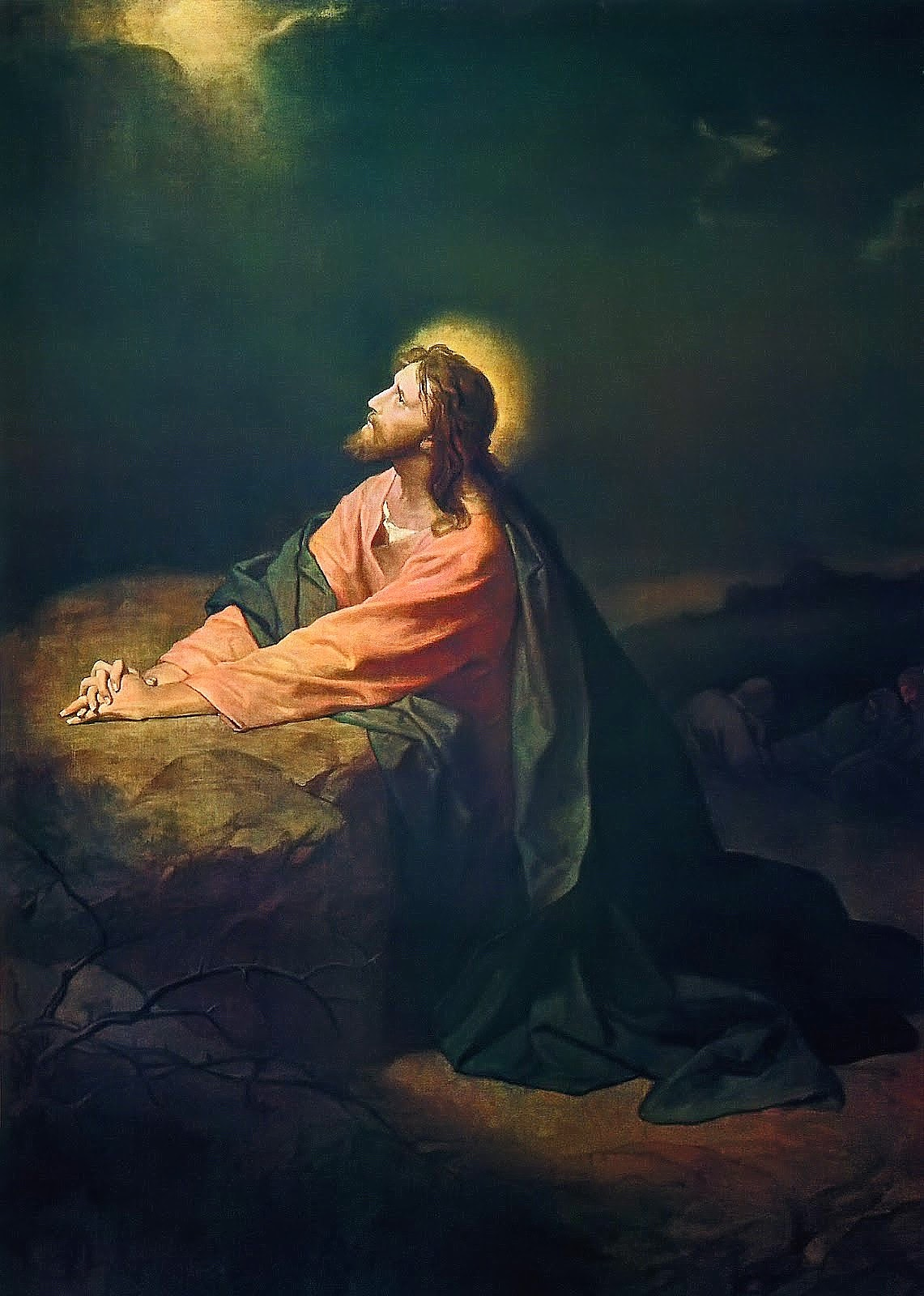
Christ in Gethsemane, Heinrich Hofmann, 1886

Holy Hour (Latin: hora sancta) is the Catholic devotional tradition of spending an hour in prayer and meditation on the agony of Jesus Christ in the garden of Gethsemane, or in Eucharistic adoration in the presence of the Blessed Sacrament. A plenary indulgence is granted for this practice. The practice is also observed in some Lutheran churches and some Anglican churches.

== History ==
Between 1673 and 1675, most probably 1674, Saint Margaret Mary Alacoque stated that she had a vision of the Sacred Heart of Jesus before the Blessed Sacrament in which she was instructed to spend an hour lying prostrate with her face to the ground every Thursday night, between eleven and midnight, and to pray and meditate on the agony of Jesus in the Garden of Gethsemane.

"You shalt, moreover, receive communion on the First Friday of each month. And every night between the Thursday and the Friday I will make you share in My mortal sadness which I accepted to feel in the Garden of Olives, and this sadness, without you being able to understand it, shall reduce you to a kind of agony harder to endure than death itself. And in order to bear Me company in the humble prayer that I then offered to My Father, in the midst of My anguish, you shall rise between 11 P.M. and midnight, and remain prostrate with Me for an hour, not only to appease the divine anger by begging mercy for sinners, but also to mitigate in some way the bitterness which I felt at that time on finding Myself abandoned by My Apostles, which obliged Me to reproach them for not being able to watch one hour with Me. During that hour you shall do what I shall teach you."

This personal practice of Saint Margaret Mary Alacoque later became widespread among Roman Catholics, who also began to perform it during an hour of Eucharistic adoration. In some regions of the world, that form of Holy Hour before the Blessed Sacrament is far more well known than the original form of practice. Pope Pius VI granted a plenary indulgence for those who would visit the Blessed Sacrament on the first Thursday of the month.

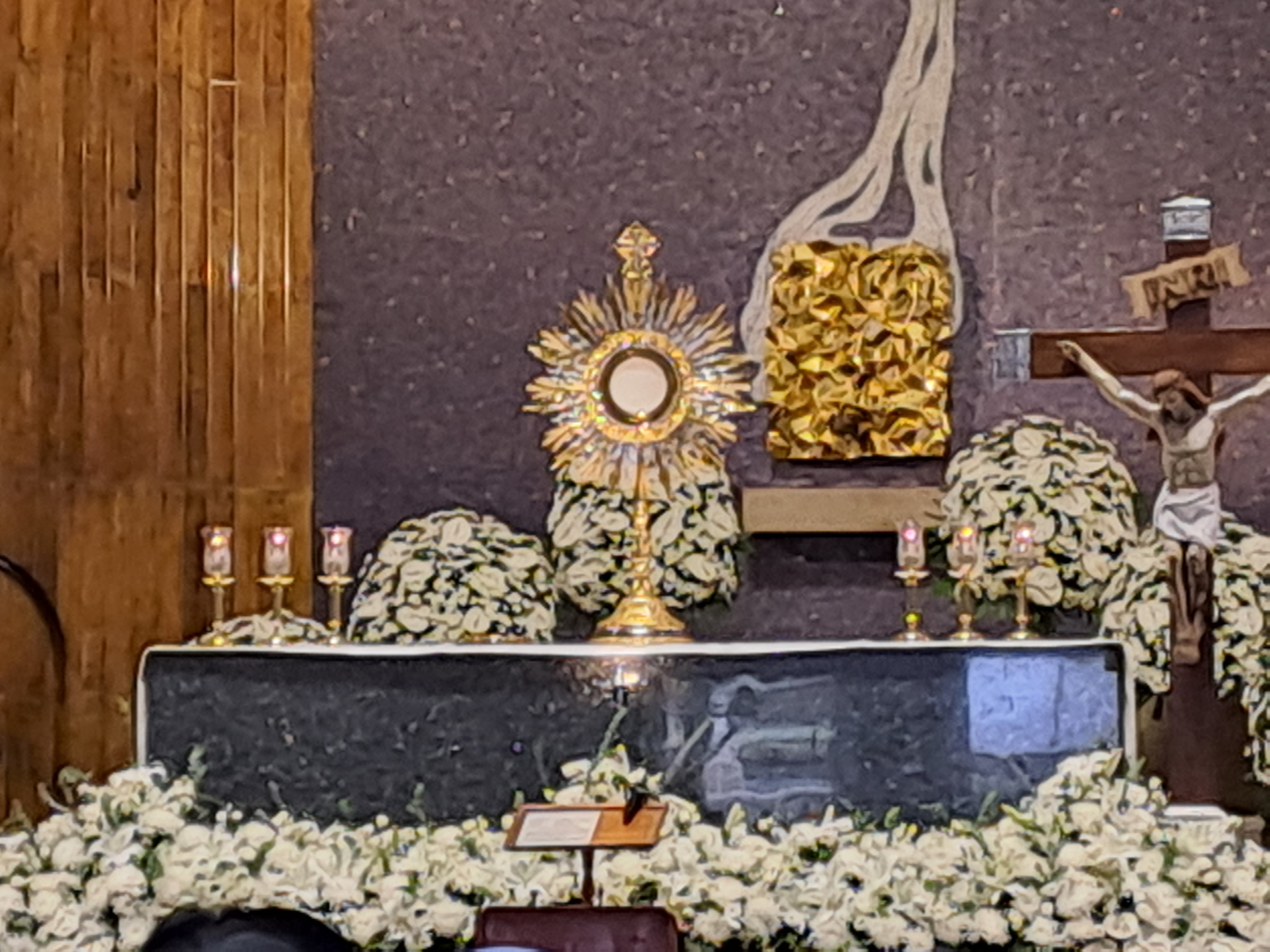
Holy Hour at Santa Cruz Church, Manila, Philippines

In 1829, the Archconfraternity of the Holy Hour was established by Père Robert Debrosse at Paray-le-Monial, Burgundy, France. In 1911 it received the right of aggregation for the entire world.

A similar society called "The Holy Perpetual Hour of Gethsemani" was formed in Toulouse in 1885 and was canonically erected in 1907. In 1909 it received indulgences from Pope Pius X.

Picpus Father Mateo Crawley-Boevey (1875–1960) promoted an at-home Holy Hour for those who couldn't make it to an oratory or chapel.

== The practice of the Holy Hour ==
The inspiration for the Holy Hour is Matthew 26:40. In the Gospel of Matthew, during the agony in the Garden of Gethsemane the night before his crucifixion, Jesus spoke to his disciples, saying "My soul is sorrowful even to death. Remain here and keep watch with me." (Matthew 26:38) Returning to the disciples after prayer, he found them asleep and in Matthew 26:40 he asked Peter: "So, could you men not keep watch with me for an hour?". He did not ask for an hour of activity, but for an hour of companionship.

Holy Hours are commonly done in Eucharistic adoration of the Blessed Sacrament, but it is not mandatory to be in the presence of the Eucharist and can be practiced at any time: in a church, at home, or outside. They are more traditionally done on a Thursday night, from 11:00 pm to midnight, usually on the eve of the first Fridays of the month, day of another devotion that came from the same private revelations of Margaret Mary Alacoque. As an example, the prayers of Margaret Mary intended to make reparations for the abandonment Jesus had felt from his apostles:

"...and that it was also to make amends for that hour of which he complained, in the Garden of Olives, that his Apostles had not kept vigil for one hour with him."

And she herself seemed to practice it both in prayer and adoration:

"He told me at that time that every night from Thursday to Friday I would rise at the hour he would tell me to say five Pater and five Ave Maria prostrated against the ground with five acts of adoration that he had taught me, to pay homage to him in the extreme anguish he suffered on the night of his Passion."

In the private writings of Mother Teresa « Come Be My Light », the Saint explains how she practices the Holy Hour:

“I make a Holy Hour each day in the presence of Jesus in the Blessed Sacrament. (...) Our Holy Hour is our daily family prayer where we get together and pray the Rosary before the exposed Blessed Sacrament the first half hour, and the second half hour we pray in silence."

Blessed Fulton J. Sheen made a vow on his ordination to make a Holy Hour every day of his life.

== Holy Thursday ==
On Holy Thursday, the liturgy of the Catholic Church provides for the transfer of the Blessed Sacrament in a procession to a side altar or a sacrament chapel after the Mass of the Lord's Supper. When the procession reaches the place of repose, the priest places the ciborium in the tabernacle on the altar of repose and incenses the Blessed Sacrament, while the Tantum ergo or another eucharistic chant is sung. After a time of silent adoration, the procession genuflects and returns to the sacristy while the faithful continue the adoration.

This particular, once-yearly Holy Hour, during which the faithful remain in silent adoration for "a suitable length of time", is to last at least until midnight, but be without any solemnity after dawn on Good Friday.

The Holy Hour on Maundy Thursday commemorates the prayer and vigil of Jesus in the Garden, when he asked his Father to spare him his suffering in view of his approaching death, as well as the admonition to his disciples "Watch, and pray, that ye enter not into temptation" (Matthew 26).

== Papal Approval ==
In his encyclical letter Miserentissimus Redemptor of 8 May 1928, Pope Pius XI mentioned Christ apparitions to Margaret Mary Alacoque and wrote about the Holy Hour, stating that "this pious exercise have been approved by the Church and have also been enriched with copious indulgences".

== Slang meaning ==
In the Irish Free State and Republic of Ireland, the "holy hour" (Irish: uair bheannaithe) was the term applied to the closing of public houses between 2.30 and 3.30 p.m. on Monday to Saturday in the cities of Dublin and Cork. It was introduced by Minister for Justice Kevin O'Higgins in the Intoxicating Liquor Act 1927 to curb afternoon drinking by workers. The law only applied to the cities of Dublin and Cork and was removed in 1988; however, public houses throughout the country remained closed from 2 pm to 4 pm on Sundays until 2000. Pubs often merely locked the doors, allowing those in the pubs to continue drinking during the holy hour.

== See also ==
- Dominicae cenae, apostolic letter of John Paul II on "The Mystery and Worship of the Eucharist"
