= Sacred Heart lamp =

Catholic devotional object

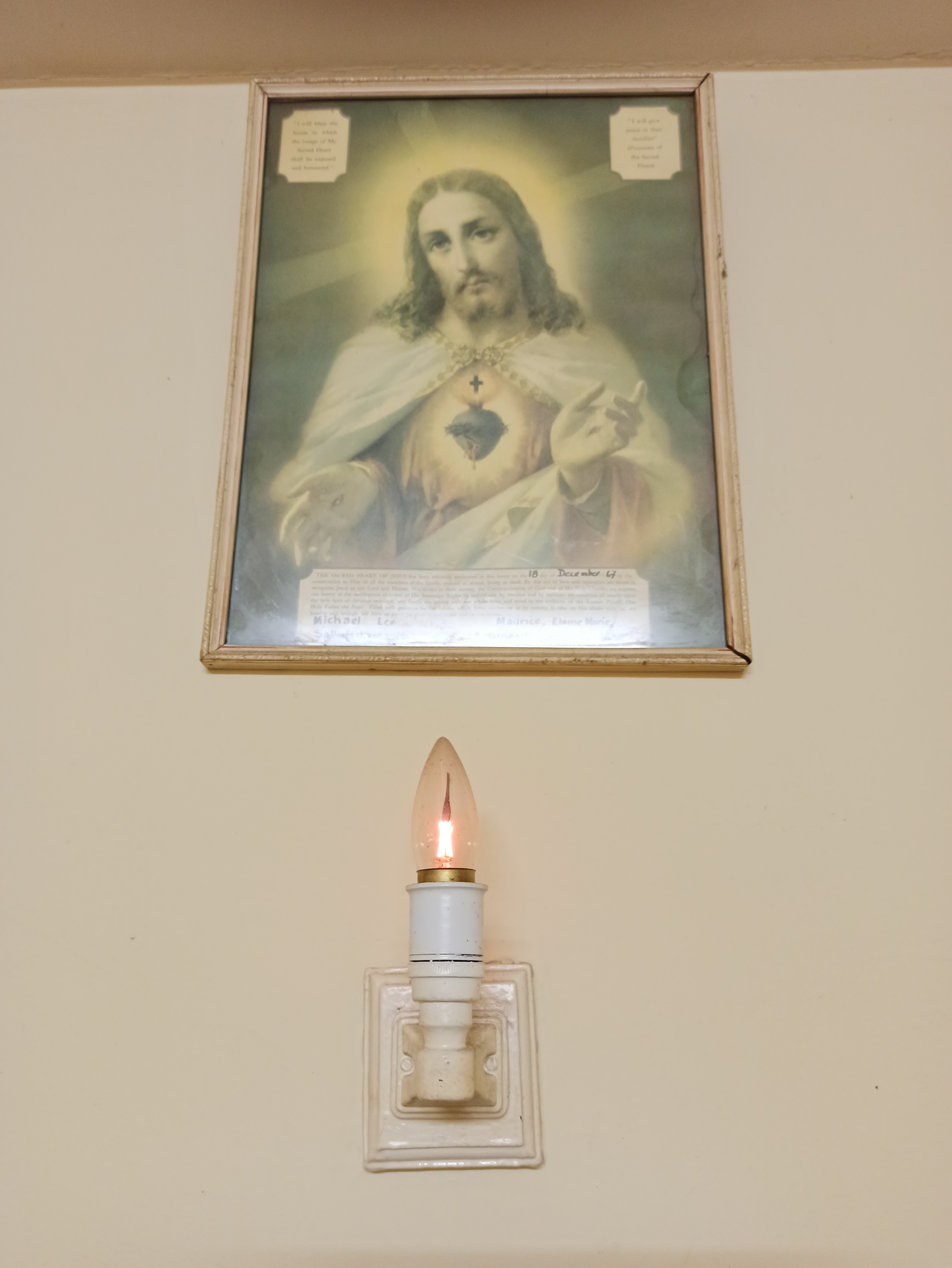
Irish sacred heart lamp

A Sacred Heart lamp is a Catholic devotional object, traditionally found in Irish homes.

== History ==
Ireland was consecrated to the Sacred Heart on Passion Sunday 1873 by the country's bishops. Fr James Cullen was appointed director to the Apostleship of Prayer for Ireland in November 1887, and later founded the Irish Messenger of the Sacred Heart in January 1888. Following this, the placement of an oil lamp with a picture of Jesus with the Sacred Heart iconography became common in Irish homes to signify the household being consecrated to the Sacred Heart. Originally an oil lamp with a red glass holder on a bracket, it was kept lit as a perpetual flame. By 1937 the Irish Messenger of the Sacred Heart reported that approximately 1 million people in Ireland had been consecrated to the Sacred Heart.

Following the electrification of rural Ireland from the 1950s, these lamps were replaced with electric bulbs. The Sacred Heart become indicative of a particular time period with Irish homes in the mid to late 20th century, being characterised by their ubiquity alongside portraits of John F. Kennedy, statues of the Child of Prague, and a portrait of the pope. After Vatican II, the prevalence of these objects and devotion to the Sacred Heart in Ireland went into a slight decline.

Today, it is regarded as a symbol of Irish childhood. It holds a notable place in Irish culture due to its widespread presence in Irish homes over the last century and its continued presence in many homes today. This stems from the pictures being passed down through families and the tradition of gifting a Sacred Heart Lamp to newlyweds, a practice that continues in many areas on a smaller scale than in the 20th century.

== See also ==
- Home stoup
- Home altar
