= Litany of the Sacred Heart of Jesus =

Formal prayer in the Catholic Church

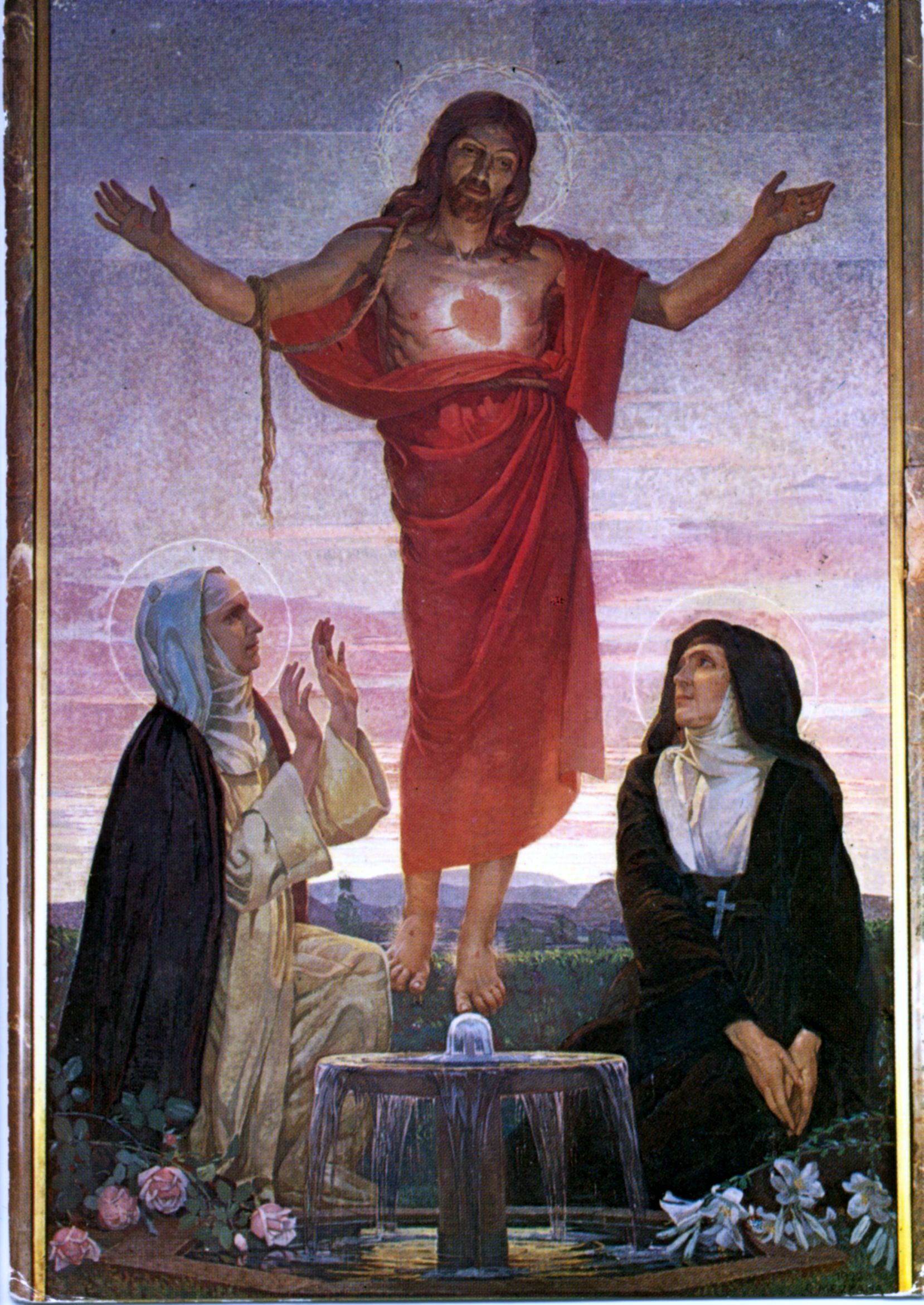
Devotion picture of the Sacred Heart being adored by Blessed Mary of the Divine Heart (Maria Droste zu Vischering) and Saint Margaret Mary Alacoque

The Litany of the Sacred Heart of Jesus is a formal prayer in the Catholic Church dedicated to Sacred Heart of Jesus. It is one of six approved litanies for public use.

== History ==
The litany is made up of portions of earlier litanies dating to the seventeenth century. This included invocations composed by Jean Croiset S.J. in 1681, and ten by the Visitandine Anne-Madeleine Remuzat, plus others for a total of thirty-three, as in the years of Jesus' earthly life. Pope Leo XIII approved the Litany of the Sacred Heart of Jesus for public usage in 1899. It is traditionally prayed on the First Fridays of the month and on the Solemnity of the Sacred Heart. A partial indulgence is attached.

In June 2023, The United States Conference of Catholic Bishops called "...on Catholics to pray the Litany of the Sacred Heart on June 16, offering this prayer as an act of reparation for the blasphemies against our Lord we see in our culture today."

== The Litany ==
Lord, have mercy.
Christ, have mercy.
Lord, have mercy.
Christ, hear us.
Christ, graciously hear us.

God, the Father of Heaven, have mercy on us.
God, the Son, Redeemer of the World, have mercy on us.
God, the Holy Ghost, have mercy on us.
Holy Trinity, one God, have mercy on us.

Heart of Jesus, Son of the Eternal Father, have mercy on us.
Heart of Jesus, formed in the womb of the Virgin Mother by the Holy Ghost, have mercy on us.
Heart of Jesus, united substantially with the word of God, have mercy on us.
Heart of Jesus, of infinite majesty, have mercy on us.
Heart of Jesus, holy temple of God, have mercy on us.
Heart of Jesus, tabernacle of the Most High, have mercy on us.
Heart of Jesus, house of God and gate of heaven, have mercy on us.
Heart of Jesus, glowing furnace of charity, have mercy on us.
Heart of Jesus, vessel of justice and love, have mercy on us.
Heart of Jesus, full of goodness and love, have mercy on us.
Heart of Jesus, abyss of all virtues, have mercy on us.
Heart of Jesus, most worthy of all praise, have mercy on us.
Heart of Jesus, king and center of all hearts, have mercy on us.
Heart of Jesus, in whom are all the treasures of wisdom and knowledge, have mercy on us.
Heart of Jesus, in whom dwelleth all the fullness of the Divinity, have mercy on us.
Heart of Jesus, in whom the Father is well pleased, have mercy on us.
Heart of Jesus, of whose fullness we have all received, have mercy on us.
Heart of Jesus, desire of the everlasting hills, have mercy on us.
Heart of Jesus, patient and rich in mercy, have mercy on us.
Heart of Jesus, rich to all who invoke Thee, have mercy on us.
Heart of Jesus, fount of life and holiness, have mercy on us.
Heart of Jesus, propitiation for our sins, have mercy on us.
Heart of Jesus, saturated with revilings, have mercy on us.
Heart of Jesus, crushed for our iniquities, have mercy on us.
Heart of Jesus, made obedient unto death, have mercy on us.
Heart of Jesus, pierced with a lance, have mercy on us.
Heart of Jesus, source of all consolation, have mercy on us.
Heart of Jesus, our life and resurrection, have mercy on us.
Heart of Jesus, our peace and reconciliation, have mercy on us.
Heart of Jesus, victim for our sins, have mercy on us.
Heart of Jesus, salvation of those who hope in Thee, have mercy on us.
Heart of Jesus, hope of those who die in Thee, have mercy on us.
Heart of Jesus, delight of all saints, have mercy on us.

Lamb of God, who takest away the sins of the world, spare us, O Lord.
Lamb of God, who takest away the sins of the world, graciously hear us, O Lord,
Lamb of God who takest away the sins of the world, have mercy on us.

V. Jesus, meek and humble of Heart.
R. Make our hearts like unto Thine.

Let us pray
Almighty and everlasting God, look upon the Heart of Thy well-beloved Son and upon the acts of praise and satisfaction which He renders unto Thee in the name of sinners; and do Thou, in Thy great goodness, grant pardon to them who seek Thy mercy, in the name of the same Thy Son, Jesus Christ, who liveth and reigneth with Thee, world without end.
Amen.

== Indulgence ==
The 2004 Enchiridion Indulgentiarum grants the partial indulgence to the faithfuls of Christ who piously pray the Litanies.

== See also ==
- Prayer in the Catholic Church
- Litanies
