= Sacred Heart =

Christian devotion

The Sacred Heart of Jesus
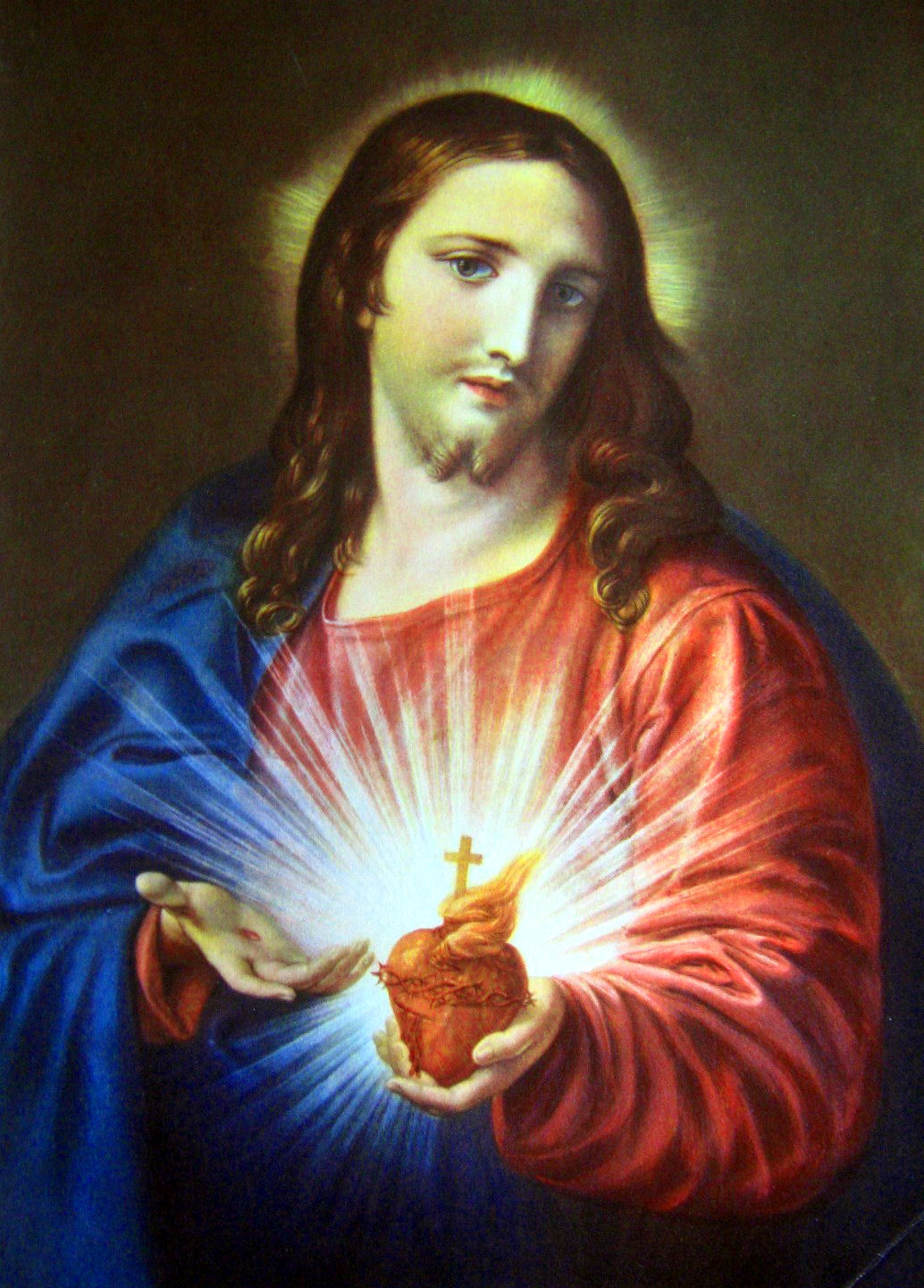
- Sacred Heart of Jesus by the Italian artist Pompeo Batoni in the Church of the Gesù, Rome
- Venerated in: Catholic Church (Eastern and Western); Western Orthodoxy; Anglican Communion; Lutheranism
- Feast: Third Friday after Pentecost
- Attributes: Burning bloodied heart, surmounted with cross and thorns
- Influenced: First Fridays Devotion

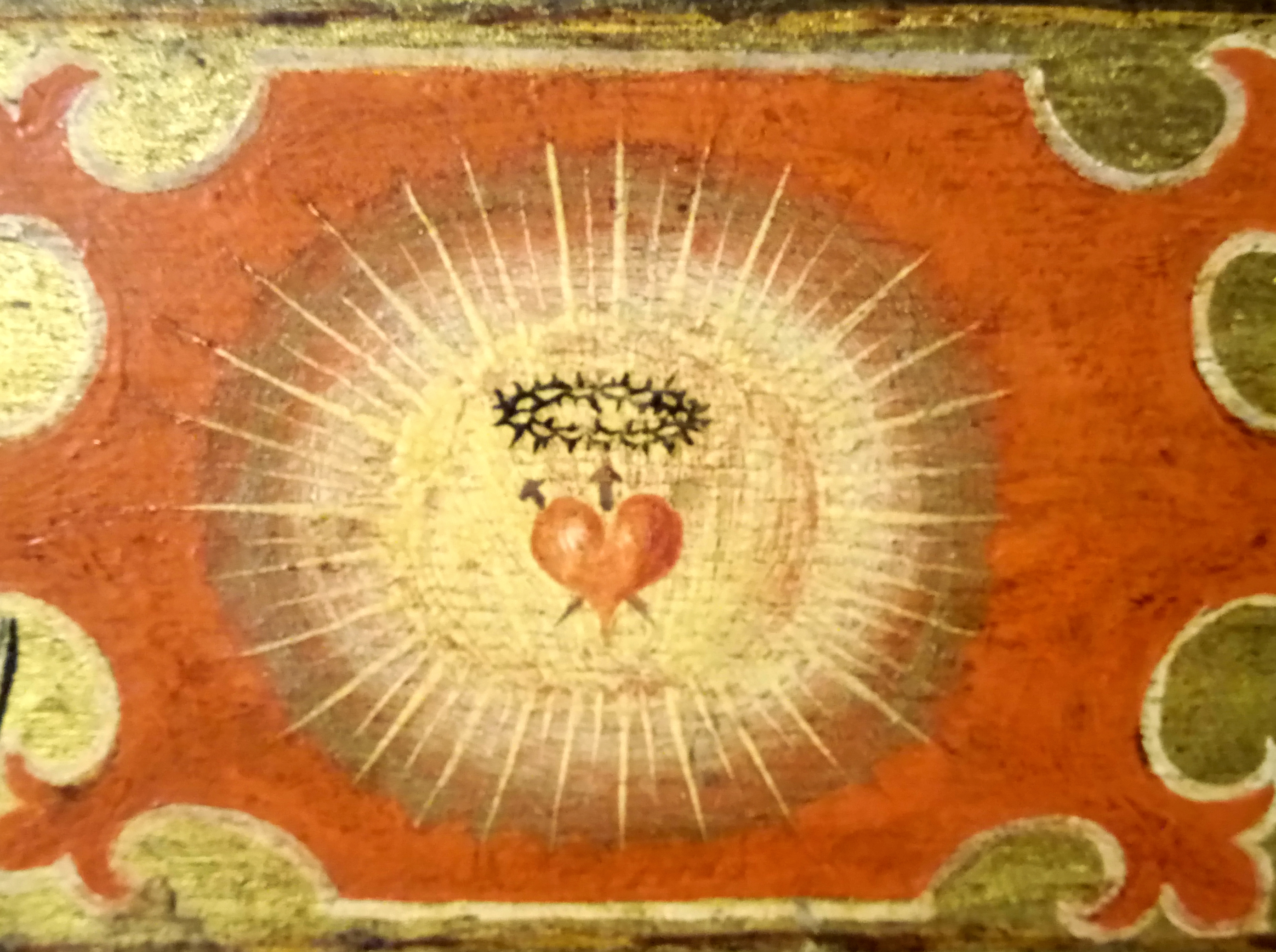
Sacred Heart of Jesus, Church of Saint-Gervais-et-Saint-Protais, Paris, France

The Most Sacred Heart of Jesus (Latin: Cor Jesu Sacratissimum) is one of the most widely practised and well-known Catholic devotions, wherein the heart of Jesus Christ is viewed as a symbol of "God's boundless and passionate love for mankind". This devotion to Christ is predominantly used in the Catholic Church, followed by some high church Anglicans, and some Western Rite Orthodox. In the Latin Church, the liturgical Solemnity of the Most Sacred Heart of Jesus is celebrated on the third Friday after Pentecost. The 12 promises of the Most Sacred Heart of Jesus are also popular.

The devotion is especially concerned with what the Church deems to be the long-suffering love and compassion of the heart of Christ towards humanity. The popularization of this devotion in its modern form is derived from a Roman Catholic nun from France, Margaret Mary Alacoque, who said she learned the devotion from Jesus during a series of apparitions to her between 1673 and 1675, and later, in the 19th century, from the mystical revelations of another Catholic nun in Portugal, Mary of the Divine Heart, a religious sister of the congregation of the Good Shepherd, who requested in the name of Christ that Pope Leo XIII consecrate the entire world to the Sacred Heart of Jesus. Predecessors to the modern devotion arose unmistakably in the Middle Ages in various facets of Catholic mysticism, particularly with Gertrude the Great.

== Description ==
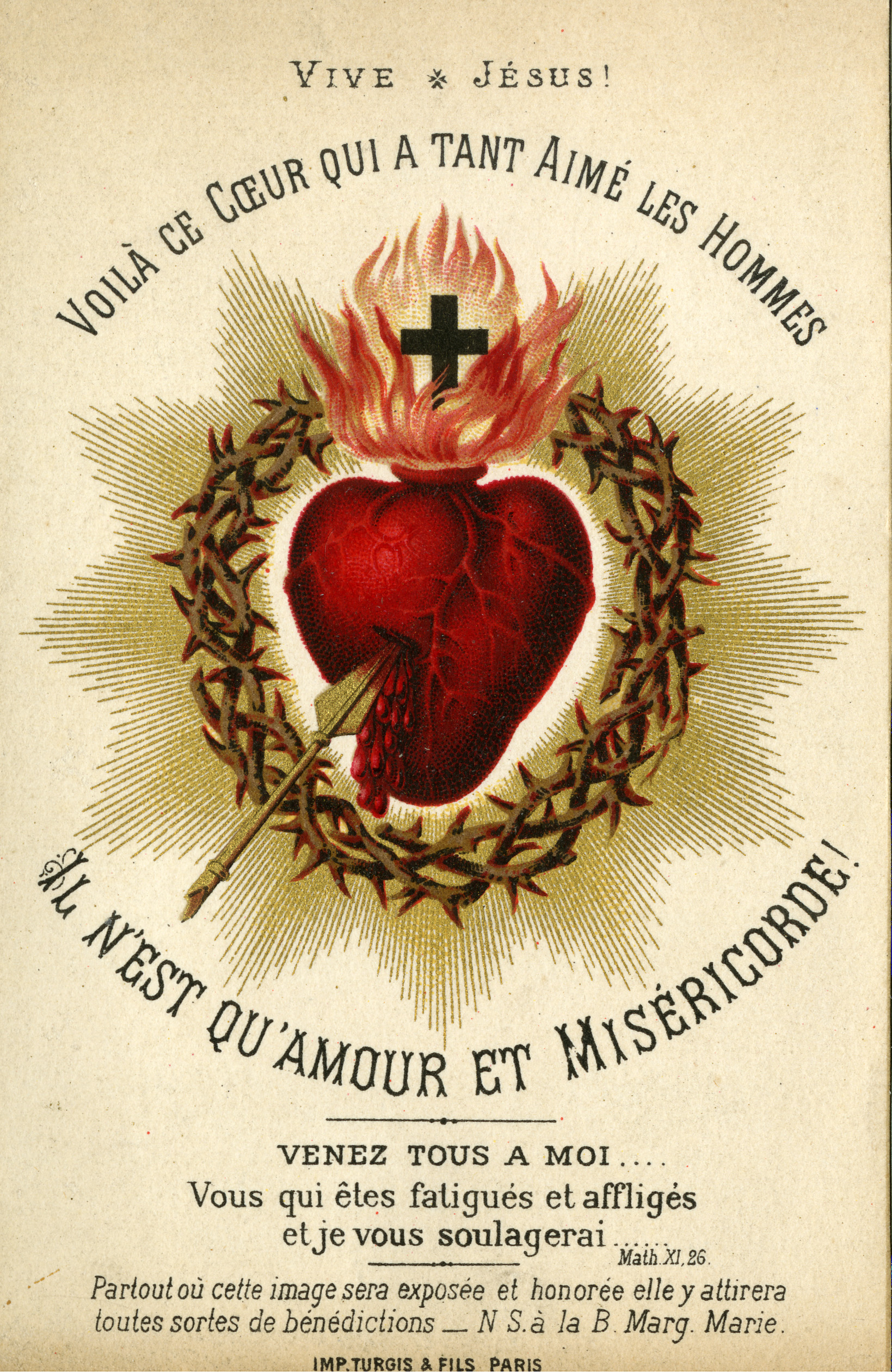
Holy card depicting the Sacred Heart of Jesus, c. 1880. Auguste Martin collection, University of Dayton Libraries

The Sacred Heart is often depicted in Christian art as a flaming heart shining with divine light, pierced by the lance-wound, encircled by the crown of thorns, surmounted by a cross, and bleeding. Sometimes, the image is shown shining within the bosom of Christ with his wounded hands pointing at the heart. The wounds and crown of thorns allude to the manner of Christ's passion, while the flames represent a furnace of ardent love.

== History of the devotion ==
=== Early devotion ===
Historically, the devotion to the Sacred Heart is an outgrowth of devotion to what is believed to be Christ's sacred humanity. During the first ten centuries of Christianity, there is nothing to indicate that any worship was rendered to the wounded Heart of Jesus. The revival of religious life and the zealous activity of Bernard of Clairvaux and Francis of Assisi in the twelfth and thirteenth centuries, together with the enthusiasm of the Crusaders returning from the Holy Land, gave a rise to devotion to the Passion of Jesus Christ and particularly to practices in honour of the Sacred Wounds.

Devotion to the Sacred Heart developed out of the devotion to the Holy Wounds, in particular to the Sacred Wound in the side of Jesus. The first indications of devotion to the Sacred Heart are found in the eleventh and twelfth centuries in the fervent atmosphere of the Benedictine or Cistercian monasteries. It is impossible to say with certainty what were its first texts or who were its first devotees.

Bernard of Clairvaux (d. 1153) said that the piercing of Christ's side revealed his goodness and the charity of his heart for humanity. The earliest known hymn to the Sacred Heart, "Summi Regis Cor Aveto", is believed to have been written by the Norbertine Herman Joseph (d. 1241) of Cologne, Germany. The hymn begins: "I hail Thee kingly Heart most high."

From the 13th to the 16th centuries, the devotion was propagated but it did not seem to have been embellished. It was everywhere practised by individuals and by different religious congregations, such as the Franciscans, Dominicans, and Carthusians. Among the Franciscans the devotion to the Sacred Heart of Jesus has its champions in Bonaventure (d. 1274) in his Vitis Mystica ("Mystic Vine") and John de la Verna. Bonaventure wrote: "Who is there who would not love this wounded heart? Who would not love in return Him, who loves so much?" It was, nevertheless, a private, individual devotion of the mystical order. Nothing of a general movement had been inaugurated, except for similarities found in the devotion to the Five Holy Wounds by the Franciscans, in which the wound in Jesus's heart figured most prominently.

Bonaventure's Opusculum 3, Lignum vitae (a part from which is the reading for the Divine Office on the Solemnity of the Sacred Heart) refers to the heart as the fountain from which God's love poured into one's life:

Take thought now, redeemed man, and consider how great and worthy is he who hangs on the cross for you. His death brings the dead to life, but at his passing heaven and earth are plunged into mourning and hard rocks are split asunder. It was a divine decree that permitted one of the soldiers to open his sacred side with a lance. This was done so that the Church might be formed from the side of Christ as he slept the sleep of death on the cross, and so that the Scripture might be fulfilled: 'They shall look on him whom they pierced'. The blood and water, which poured out at that moment, were the price of our salvation. Flowing from the secret abyss of our Lord's heart as from a fountain, this stream gave the sacraments of the Church the power to confer the life of grace, while for those already living in Christ it became a spring of living water welling up to life everlasting.

==== Lutgarde ====
According to Thomas Merton, Lutgarde (d. 1246), a Cistercian mystic of Aywieres, Belgium, was one of the great precursors of the devotion to the Sacred Heart of Jesus. A contemporary of Francis of Assisi, she "entered upon the mystical life with a vision of the pierced Heart of the Saviour, and had concluded her mystical espousals with the Incarnate Word by an exchange of hearts with Him." Sources say that Christ came in a visitation to Lutgarde, offering her whatever gift of grace she should desire; she asked for a better grasp of Latin, that she might better understand the word of God and sing God's praise. Christ granted her request and Lutgarde's mind was flooded with the riches of psalms, antiphons, readings, and responsories. However, a painful emptiness persisted. She returned to Christ, asking to return his gift, and wondering if she might, just possibly, exchange it for another. "And for what would you exchange it?" Christ asked. "Lord, I would exchange it for your Heart." Christ then reached into Lutgarde and, removing her heart, replaced it with his own, at the same time hiding her heart within his breast.

==== Mechtilde ====
Mechtilde of Helfta (d. 1298) became an ardent devotee and promoter of Jesus' heart after it was the subject of many of her visions. The idea of hearing the heartbeat of God was very important to medieval saints who nurtured devotion to the Sacred Heart. Mechtilde reported that Jesus appeared to her in a vision and commanded her to love him ardently, and to honor his sacred heart in the Blessed Sacrament as much as possible. He gave her his heart as a pledge of his love, as a place of refuge during her life and as her consolation at the hour of her death. From this time Mechtilde had an extraordinary devotion for the Sacred Heart, and said that if she had to write down all the favors and all the blessings which she had received by means of this devotion, a large book would not contain them.

==== Gertrude ====
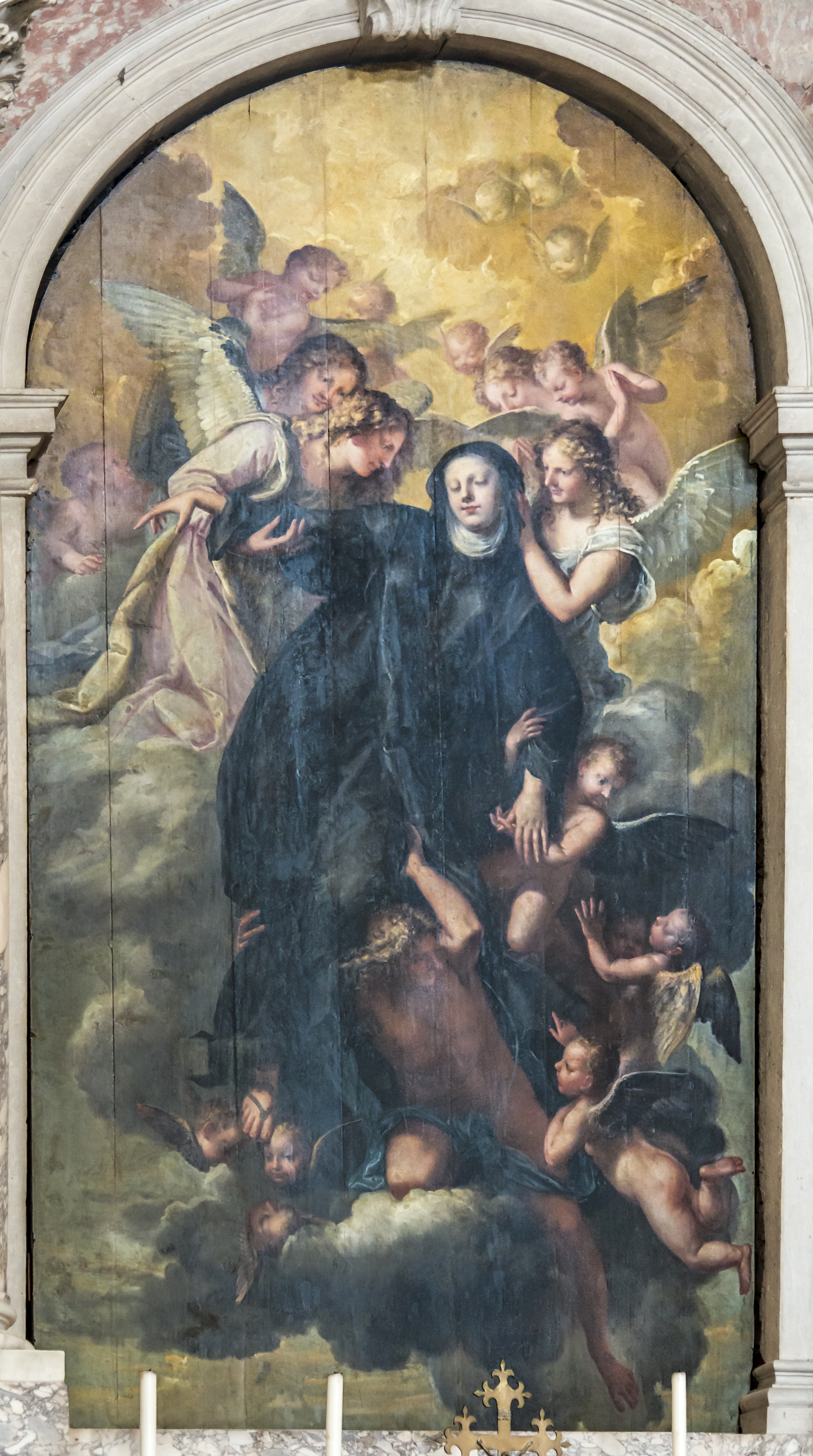
Mystic Ecstasy of St. Gertrude the Great – worshipper of the Sacred Heart of Jesus Christ (picture by Pietro Liberi, at the Abbey of Santa Giustina, Padua, Italy)

Gertrude the Great was an early devotee of the Sacred Heart of Jesus. Book 2 of the Herald of Divine Love (Latin: Legatus divinæ pietatis) vividly describes Gertrude's visions, which show a considerable elaboration on the hitherto ill-defined veneration of Christ's heart. Bernard articulated this in his commentary on the Song of Songs. The women of Helfta – Gertrude foremost, who surely knew Bernard's commentary, and to a somewhat lesser extent the two Mechthildes – experienced this devotion centrally in their mystical visions.

In the 16th century, the devotion passed from the domain of mysticism into that of Christian asceticism. It was established as a devotion with prayers already formulated and special exercises, found in the writings of Lanspergius (d. 1539) of the Carthusians of Cologne, the Benedictine Louis de Blois (d. 1566) Abbot of Liessies in Hainaut, John of Avila (d. 1569), and Francis de Sales (d. 1622).

The historical record from that time shows an early bringing to light of the devotion. Ascetic writers spoke of it, especially those of the Society of Jesus (Jesuits). The image of the Sacred Heart of Jesus was everywhere in evidence, largely due to the Franciscan devotion to the Five Wounds and to the Jesuits placing the image on the title-page of their books and on the walls of their churches.

The first to establish the theological basis for the devotion was Polish Jesuit Kasper Drużbicki (1590–1662) in his book Meta cordium – Cor Jesu (The goal of hearts – Heart of Jesus). Not much later John Eudes wrote an office, and promoted a feast for it. John Eudes is regarded as "tireless apostle of the devotion of the Sacred Hearts", entitling him as 'Father', doctor and apostle of the liturgical cult of the hearts of Jesus and Mary.

Little by little, the devotion to the Sacred Hearts became distinct, and on 31 August 1670 the first feast of the Sacred Heart of Jesus was celebrated in the Grand Seminary of Rennes. Coutances followed suit on October 20, a day with which the Eudist feast was from then on to be connected. The feast soon spread to other dioceses, and the devotion was likewise adopted in various religious communities. It gradually came into contact with the devotion begun by Margaret Mary Alacoque at Paray-le-Monial, and the two merged.

=== Margaret Mary Alacoque ===
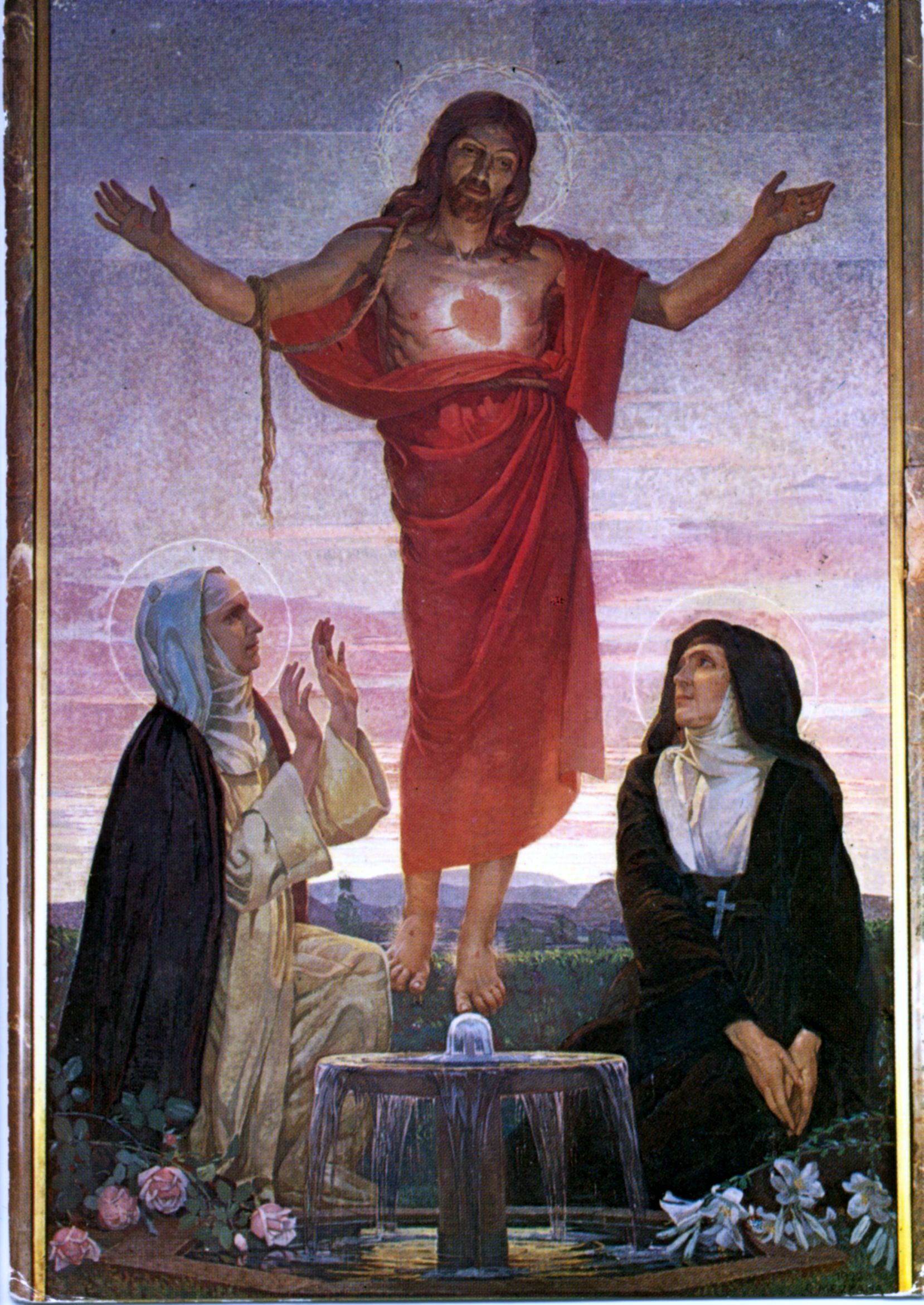
Picture of the Sacred Heart being adored by Margaret Mary Alacoque and Mary of the Divine Heart

The most significant source for the devotion to the Sacred Heart in the form it is known today was Margaret Mary Alacoque (1647–1690), a nun of the Order of the Visitation of Holy Mary, who claimed to have received Sacred Heart revelations from Jesus Christ between 1673 and 1675 in the Burgundian French village of Paray-le-Monial.

The first apparition took place on 27 December 1673, the day of the feast of Saint John the Evangelist, during which Jesus allowed Margaret Mary to rest her head upon his heart, telling her that he wanted to make his love known to all mankind and that he had chosen her to spread the devotion to his Sacred Heart. Right after this, she had a vision of his heart with a crown of thorns, surrounded by flames and above which a cross was planted. This representation will become the popular image of the Sacred Heart which Margaret Mary used to propagate the devotion.

Between 1674 and 1675, other apparitions followed in which Jesus Christ revealed to Alacoque different forms of devotion to the Sacred Heart. The First Fridays Devotion, which is the reception of Holy Communion on nine first Fridays of each month, was revealed to her through a "Great Promise" of final penance granted to those who practice this act of reparation. Margaret Mary also said that she was instructed to spend an hour every Thursday night, from eleven to midnight, to pray and meditate on Jesus' agony in the Garden of Gethsemane. Her prayers intended to ask mercy for sinners as well as to make reparation for the abandonment Jesus felt from his apostles in the garden. This practice is now known as the "Holy Hour" and is also frequently performed during an hour of Eucharistic adoration.

During the octave of Corpus Christi in 1675, probably on June 16, the vision known as the "great revelation" reportedly took place, where Jesus said: "Behold the heart which has so loved men that it has spared nothing, even to exhausting and consuming itself, in order to testify its love; and in return, I receive from the greater part only ingratitude, by their irreverence and sacrilege, and by the coldness and contempt they have for me in this sacrament of love." He then asked Margaret Mary for a feast of reparation of the Friday after the octave of Corpus Christi, bidding her consult her confessor Claude de la Colombière, then superior of the small Jesuit house at Paray-le-Monial. This request was transmitted and the feast of the Sacred Heart was progressively instituted throughout the Church. The feast later became a solemnity in the liturgical calendar, a feast of the highest rank, celebrated eight days after the Feast of Corpus Christi just as Jesus requested. On 21 June 1675, following that apparition, Claude consecrated himself to the Sacred Heart, making him the first person to be consecrated to the Sacred Heart of Jesus after Margaret Mary, and began spreading the devotion.

De la Colombière directed her to write an account of the apparitions, which he discreetly circulated in France and England. After his death on 15 February 1682, his journal of spiritual retreats was found to contain a copy in his handwriting of the account that he had requested of Margaret Mary, together with a few reflections on the usefulness of the devotion. This journal, including the account – an "offering" to the Sacred Heart in which the devotion was explained – was published at Lyon in 1684. The little book was widely read, especially at Paray-le-Monial. Margaret Mary reported feeling "dreadful confusion" over the book's contents, but resolved to make the best of it, approving of the book for the spreading of her cherished devotion. Along with the Visitandines, priests, religious, and laymen espoused the devotion, particularly the Capuchins. The reported apparitions served as a catalyst for the promotion of the devotion to the Sacred Heart. In 1691 Jesuit priest John Croiset wrote a book called De la Dévotion au Sacré Cœur, and Joseph de Gallifet promoted the devotion. The mission of propagating the new devotion was especially confided to the religious of the Visitation and to the priests of the Society of Jesus.

==== Promises Given to Margaret Mary Alacoque ====
Alacoque said that in her apparitions Jesus promised specific blessings to those who practice devotion to his Sacred Heart. The last promise, also called the "Great Promise", is a promise of final penance granted to those who practice the First Fridays Devotion.

1. I will give them all the graces necessary for their state of life.
2. I will give peace in their families.
3. I will console them in all their troubles.
4. I will be their refuge in life and especially in death.
5. I will abundantly bless all their undertakings.
6. Sinners shall find in my Heart the source and infinite ocean of mercy.
7. Tepid souls shall become fervent.
8. Fervent souls shall rise speedily to great perfection.
9. I will bless those places wherein the image of My Sacred Heart shall be exposed and venerated.
10. I will give to priests the power to touch the most hardened hearts.
11. Persons who propagate this devotion shall have their names eternally written in my Heart.
12. In the excess of the mercy of my Heart, I promise you that my all powerful love will grant to all those who will receive Communion on the first Friday, for nine consecutive months, the grace of final repentance: they will not die in my displeasure, nor without receiving the sacraments; and my Heart will be their secure refuge in that last hour.

=== Mary of the Divine Heart ===
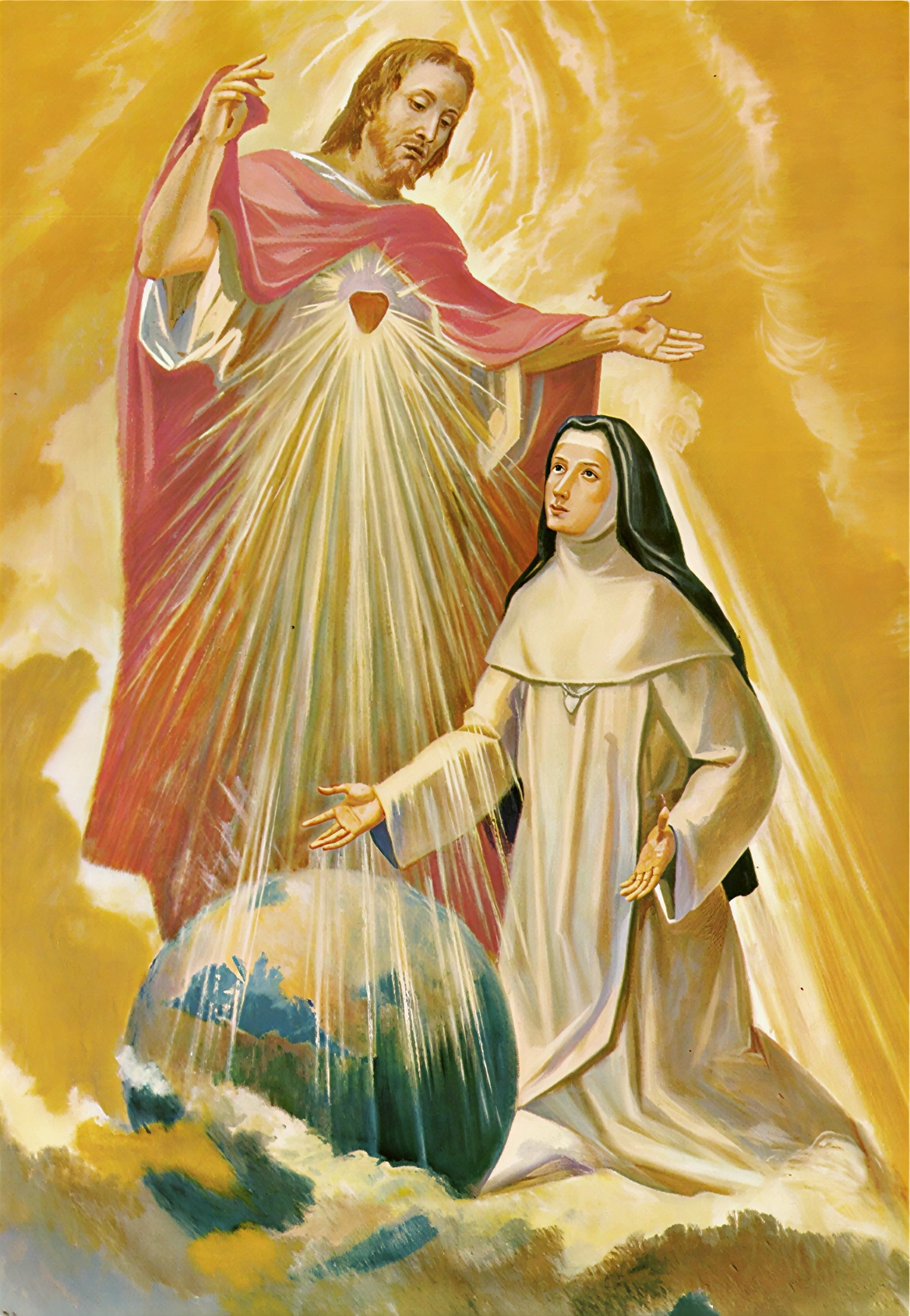
Painting representing the vision received by Mary of the Divine Heart

Another source for the devotion to the Sacred Heart of Jesus was Mary of the Divine Heart (1863–1899), a noble from Droste zu Vischering family and religious sister from the Congregation of Our Lady of Charity of the Good Shepherd, who reported to have received several interior locutions and visions of Jesus Christ. The first interior locution that she reported was during her youth spent with the family in the Castle of Darfeld, near Münster, Germany, and the last vision and private revelation was reported during her presence as mother superior in the Convent of the Sisters of the Good Shepherd in Porto, Portugal.

Based on the messages she said she received in her revelations of Christ, on 10 June 1898 her confessor at the Good Shepherd Convent wrote to Pope Leo XIII stating that Mary of the Divine Heart had received a message from Christ, requesting the pope to consecrate the entire world to the Sacred Heart. The pope initially attached no credence to it and took no action. However, on 6 January 1899 she sent another letter asking that in addition to the consecration, the first Fridays of the month be observed in honor of the Sacred Heart.

Mary of the Divine Heart died in her convent in Portugal when the church was singing the first vespers of the Sacred Heart of Jesus on 8 June 1899. The following day, in Annum sacrum, Pope Leo XIII consecrated the entire world to the Sacred Heart of Jesus.

==== Church of the Sacred Heart of Jesus ====
Mary of the Divine Heart said that in her mystical experiences Jesus Christ inspired her to build a shrine dedicated to his Sacred Heart. According to the writings of Mary of the Divine Heart, Jesus said: "I will make it a place of graces. I will distribute copiously graces to all who live in this house [the convent], those who live here now, those who will live here after, and even to their relatives."

She did not live to see this come to fruition. The imposing Church of the Sacred Heart of Jesus (also referred as Church of the Good Shepherd or Sanctuary of the Sacred Heart of Jesus) was built between 14 July 1957 and 21 April 1966, in the civil parish of Ermesinde in north Portugal, and consecrated to the Heart of Christ in fulfillment of the vow made by the nun. She is buried in the Church of the Sacred Heart of Jesus in Ermesinde.

== Papal approval ==
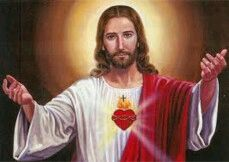
Jesus embracing all

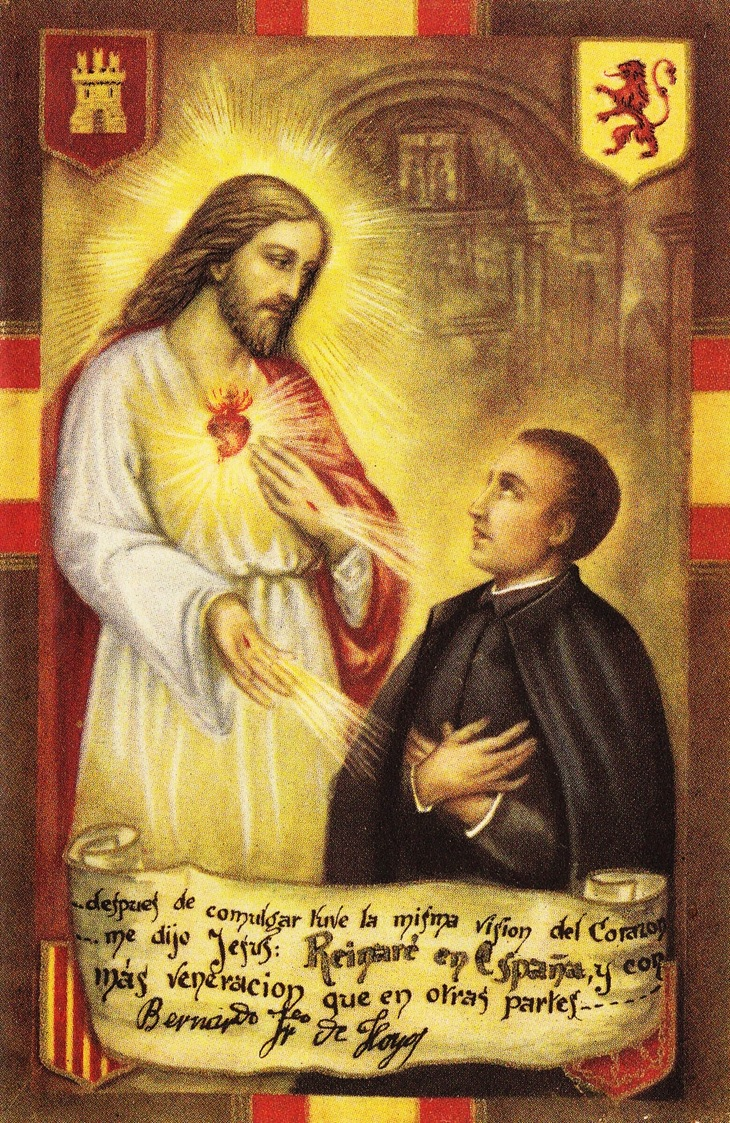
The Sacred Heart of Jesus with the Jesuit priest Bernardo de Hoyos

In 1353, Pope Innocent VI instituted a Mass honoring the mystery of the Sacred Heart.

In 1693 the Holy See imparted indulgences to the Confraternities of the Sacred Heart, and in 1697 granted the feast to the Visitandines with the Mass of the Five Wounds, but refused a feast common to all, with special Mass and Office. The devotion spread, particularly in religious communities. The Marseille plague in 1720 furnished perhaps the first occasion for a solemn consecration and public worship outside of religious communities. Other cities of southern Europe followed the example of Marseille.

After Pope Leo XIII received correspondence from Mary of the Divine Heart asking him to consecrate the entire world to the Sacred Heart of Jesus, he commissioned a group of theologians to examine the petition on the basis of revelation and sacred tradition. The outcome of this investigation was positive, and in 1899 he decreed that the consecration of the entire human race to the Sacred Heart of Jesus should take place on 11 June 1899. The encyclical letter also encouraged the entire Roman Catholic episcopate to promote the First Friday Devotions, established June as the Month of the Sacred Heart, and included the Prayer of Consecration to the Sacred Heart. The idea of this act, which Leo XIII called "the great act" of his pontificate.

Pope Pius X decreed that the consecration of the human race performed by Leo XIII be renewed each year. Pius X also granted a Pontifical decree for the imposition of a golden crown to the lowly foot of a statue of the Sacred Heart of Jesus in the Nevers Cathedral on 9 July 1908 (via the Archbishop of Nevers and Besancon, Francois Leon Gauthey, both signed and notarized by the Sacred Congregation of Rites).

Pope Pius XI affirmed the church's position with respect to Margaret Mary Alacoque's visions of Jesus Christ by stating that Jesus had "manifested Himself" to Alacoque and had "promised her that all those who rendered this honor to his Heart would be endowed with an abundance of heavenly graces". His encyclical letter Miserentissimus Redemptor (1928) reaffirmed the importance of consecration and reparation to the Sacred Heart of Jesus.

By inserting the "Great Promise" of the First Fridays Devotion into the Bull of Canonization of Margaret Mary Alacoque on 13 May 1920, Pope Benedict XV encouraged the practice of this act of reparation of the first nine fridays in honor of the Sacred Heart.

Pope Pius XII, on the occasion of the 100th anniversary of Pius IX's institution of the feast, instructed the entire Latin Church at length on the devotion to the Sacred Heart in his encyclical letter Haurietis aquas of 15 May 1956. On 15 May 2006, the 50th anniversary of that encyclical, Pope Benedict XVI sent a letter to Peter Hans Kolvenbach, the Superior General of the Society of Jesus, reaffirming the importance of the devotion to the Sacred Heart of Jesus. On 24 October 2024, Pope Francis published his fourth encyclical, the 28,000-word Dilexit nos ("He loved us"), which reflects on the philosophical and theological meaning of "the heart" and addresses the importance of the devotion to the Sacred Heart in a contemporary context.

== Worship and devotion ==
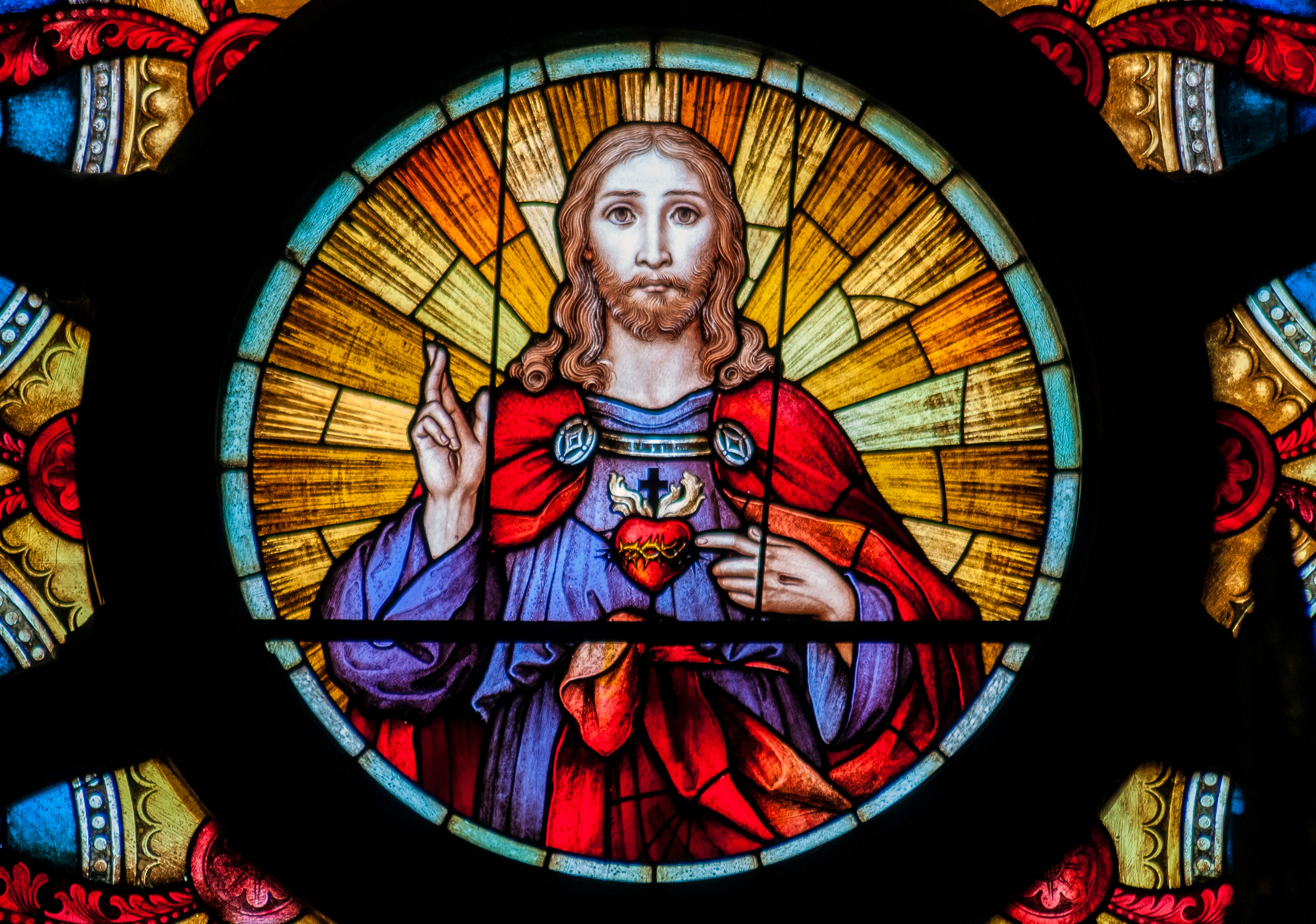
Sacred Heart at the centre of a rose window, Parish of the Immaculate Conception, São Paulo, Brazil

Worship of the Sacred Heart mainly consists of several devotions, practices, consecrations, hymns, the salutation of the Sacred Heart, and the Litany of the Sacred Heart. It is common in Roman Catholic services.

Since c. 1850, groups, congregations, and countries have consecrated themselves to the Sacred Heart.

By a law voted on 24 July 1873, the Basilica of the Sacred Heart of Montmartre known as National Vow, is declared of public utility by the National Assembly of 1871. On 16 June 1875, the Archbishop of Paris, Cardinal Guibert laid the first stone of the basilica, honoring after two hundred years the fourth request of Jesus reported by Margaret Mary Alacoque from 16 June 1675.

On 25 March 1874, by petition of president Gabriel García Moreno and archbishop José Ignacio Checa y Barba, Ecuador was the first country in the world to be consecrated to the Sacred Heart by legislative decree. Since then, more than twenty countries have followed and consecrated themselves either by decree or at the initiative of their respective national Church, some of which renewed their consecration a few times. On 22 June 1902, Colombia was consecrated by decree with the agreement of president José Manuel Marroquín. On 30 May 1919, Spain was officially consecrated to the Sacred Heart by King Alfonso XIII.

In the Catholic tradition, the Sacred Heart has been closely associated with Acts of Reparation to Jesus Christ. In his encyclical Miserentissimus Redemptor, Pope Pius XI stated: "The spirit of expiation or reparation has always had the first and foremost place in the worship given to the Most Sacred Heart of Jesus." The Golden Arrow Prayer directly refers to the Sacred Heart.

=== Feast day ===
The Feast of the Sacred Heart is a solemnity in the liturgical calendar of the Latin Church. It is celebrated on the third Friday after Pentecost, which was up until the changes in the General Roman Calendar of Pope Pius XII referred to as the Friday after the octave of Corpus Christi. It is the last feast day of the year that is dependent on the date of Easter. The acts of consecration, reparation, and devotion were introduced when the feast of the Sacred Heart was declared. Some Anglican Franciscans keep the feast under the name (The) Divine Compassion of Christ.

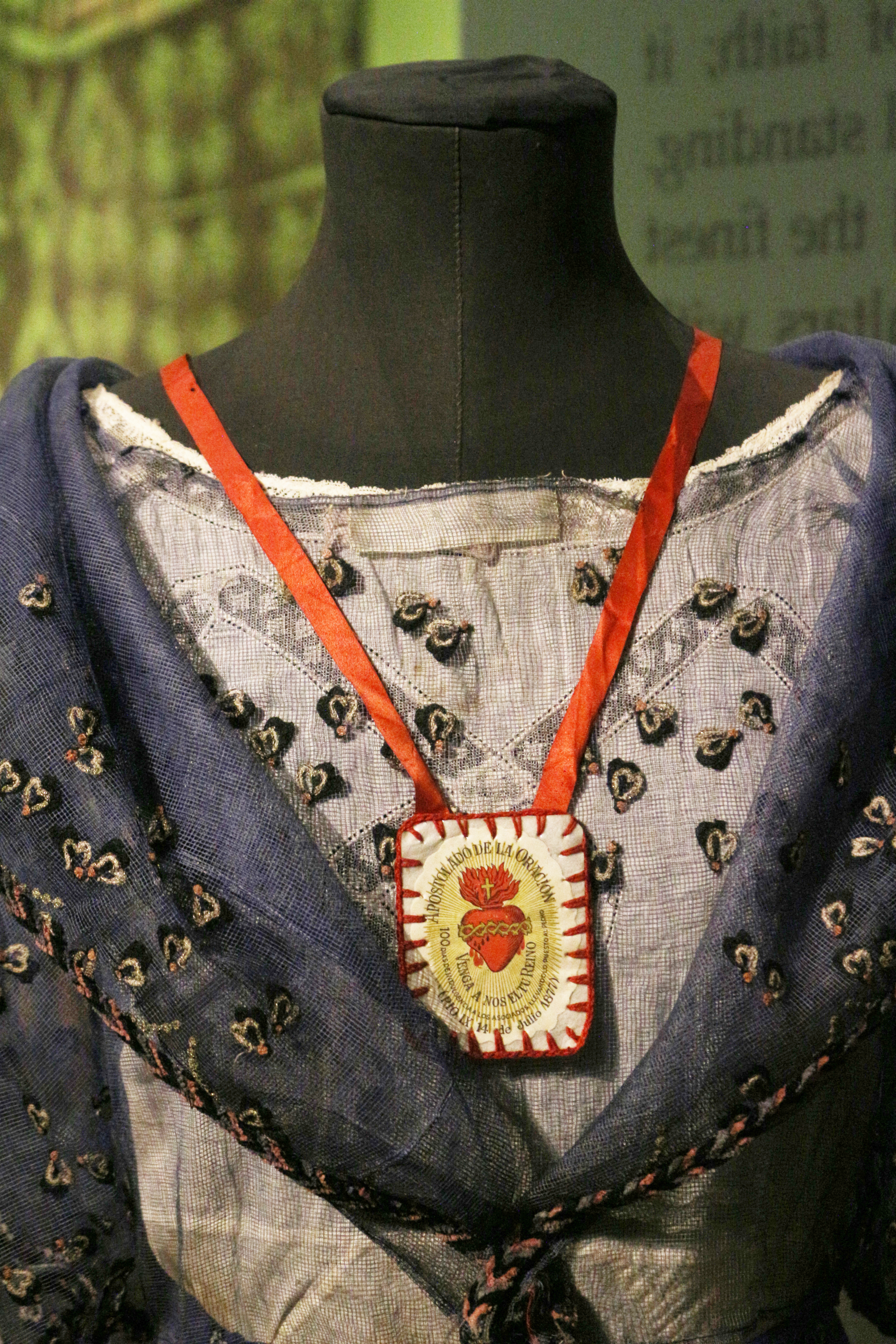
A Spanish-era Catholic devotional badge from the Philippines, featuring the Sacred Heart of Jesus, issued by the Apostleship of Prayer (now Pope's Worldwide Prayer Network).

=== Month of the Sacred Heart ===
The month of June is traditionally devoted in a special way to the veneration of the Sacred Heart. Masses, novenas, and the recitation of devotional prayers in honor of the Sacred Heart are traditionally observed.

=== Act of Consecration to the Sacred Heart ===
A personal prayer of consecration to the Sacred Heart was written by Saint Margaret Mary Alacoque, allegedly under the inspiration of Jesus, which she sent to the priest John Croiset, recommending that he include it in the book he was to publish about her revelations, claiming "It comes from Him [Jesus], and He would not agree to its omission."

On 25 May 1899, Pope Leo XIII wrote an Act of Consecration of the Human Race to the Sacred Heart in his encyclical letter Annum sacrum, with the influence of Mary of the Divine Heart and in response to demands received over 25 years.

On 19 May 1908, a particular family consecration prayer known as the Act of Consecration of the Family to the Sacred Heart was approved and granted with an indulgence by Pope Pius X.

=== First Fridays Devotion ===
The First Fridays Devotion is a devotion to offer reparations for sins to the Eucharist and in honor of the Sacred Heart, which had its origin in the apparitions of Christ reported by Margaret Mary Alacoque. This devotion to the Sacred Heart of Jesus was fully approved by the Catholic Church and a "Great Promise" of final penance was made to those who practice the First Fridays Devotion. The devotion consists of several practices that are performed on the first Fridays of nine consecutive months. On these days, a person is to attend Mass and receive the Eucharist. If the need arises, in order to receive communion in a state of grace, a person should also make use of the sacrament of penance before attending Mass.

=== Holy Hour ===
Alacoque stated that she received a vision of Jesus in which she was instructed to spend an hour every Thursday night as a reparation and to pray and meditate on his agony in the Garden of Gethsemane. This practice later became widespread among Catholics and became the devotion of the Holy Hour, a devotional tradition of spending an hour in prayers or in Eucharistic adoration in the presence of the Eucharist.

=== Enthronement of the Sacred Heart of Jesus ===
The act of enthroning the Sacred Heart entails placing an image of the Sacred Heart of Jesus in a place of honor in the home after a time of prayerful preparation. Many families will also place an image of the Immaculate Heart of Mary in tandem with the Sacred Heart image. (Note: Enthroning the Sacred Heart in a home should not be confused with the practice of having a priest bless a home, which is customarily done when a family first occupies a new home. The presence of a priest is not required for an enthronement.)

The practice of the home enthronement of the Sacred Heart was started by R. Mateo Crawley-Boevey, a priest of the Congregation of the Sacred Hearts of Jesus and Mary, in 1907, having visited the apparition chapel in Paray-le-Monial.

Enthronement of the Sacred Heart is promoted by the National Enthronement Center in Fairhaven, Massachusetts, the Sacred Heart Apostolate of Knoxville, Tennessee, Sacred Heart Columbus in Columbus, Ohio, and the Sacred Heart Enthronement Network, a 501(c)(3) located in Columbus, Ohio. It is also endorsed by the World Apostolate of Fátima.

=== Scapular of the Sacred Heart ===
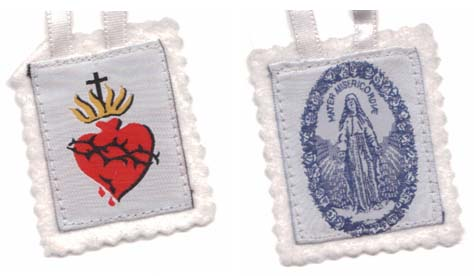
Model of the Scapular of the Sacred Heart revealed by the Virgin Mary to Estelle Faguette in Pellevoisin

The Scapular of the Sacred Heart and the Scapular of the Sacred Hearts of Jesus and Mary are devotional articles worn by some Catholics.

An early form of the Scapular of the Sacred Heart were cloth badges bearing an image of the Heart of Jesus. made and distributed by Margaret Mary Alacoque. Following the claims by Estelle Faguette that the Virgin Mary had appeared to her at Pellevoisin in 1876 and requested a scapular of the Sacred Heart of Jesus, a scapular of the proposed design was approved by the Congregation of Rites in 1900. It bears the representation of the Sacred Heart of Jesus on one side and that of the Virgin Mary under the title of Mother of Mercy on the other side.

=== Prayers ===
The Litany of the Sacred Heart of Jesus is common in Roman Catholic services and occasionally is found in Anglican services.

There is also a Morning offering to the Sacred Heart.

=== Alliance with the Immaculate Heart ===
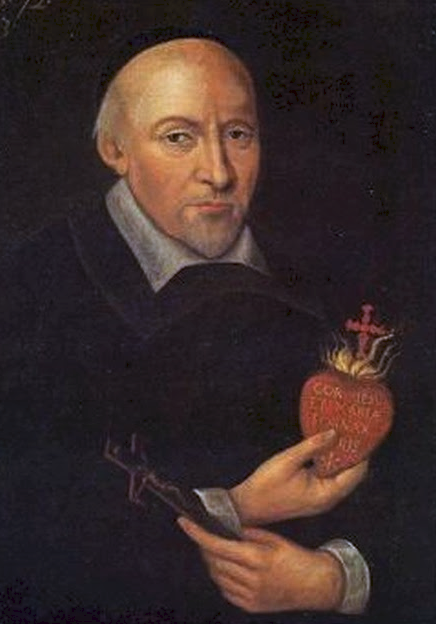
John Eudes defended the mystical unity of the Sacred Heart of Jesus and Immaculate Heart of Mary.

The "Alliance of the Hearts of Jesus and Mary" is a phrase coined by Pope John Paul II during his Angelus Address of September 15, 1985 when he mentioned that devotion to the Sacred Heart of Jesus and to the Immaculate Heart of Mary, "...though distinct, they are interrelated...." symposia were held on the concept during the 1980s and 1990s.

It was not until the seventeenth century when devotion to the Immaculate Heart of Mary was popularized by John Eudes. Although Eudes always associated the two Hearts, he began his devotional teachings with the Heart of Mary, and then extended it to the Sacred Heart of Jesus.

In the eighteenth and nineteenth centuries both devotions grew, particularly through the popularity of the Miraculous Medal, depicting the Heart of Jesus thorn-crowned and the Heart of Mary pierced with a sword. The devotions and associated prayers grew into the twentieth century through the reported messages of Our Lady of Fátima saying that the Heart of Jesus wishes to be honored together with the Heart of Mary. In the 1956 encyclical Haurietis aquas, Pope Pius XII encouraged both devotions.

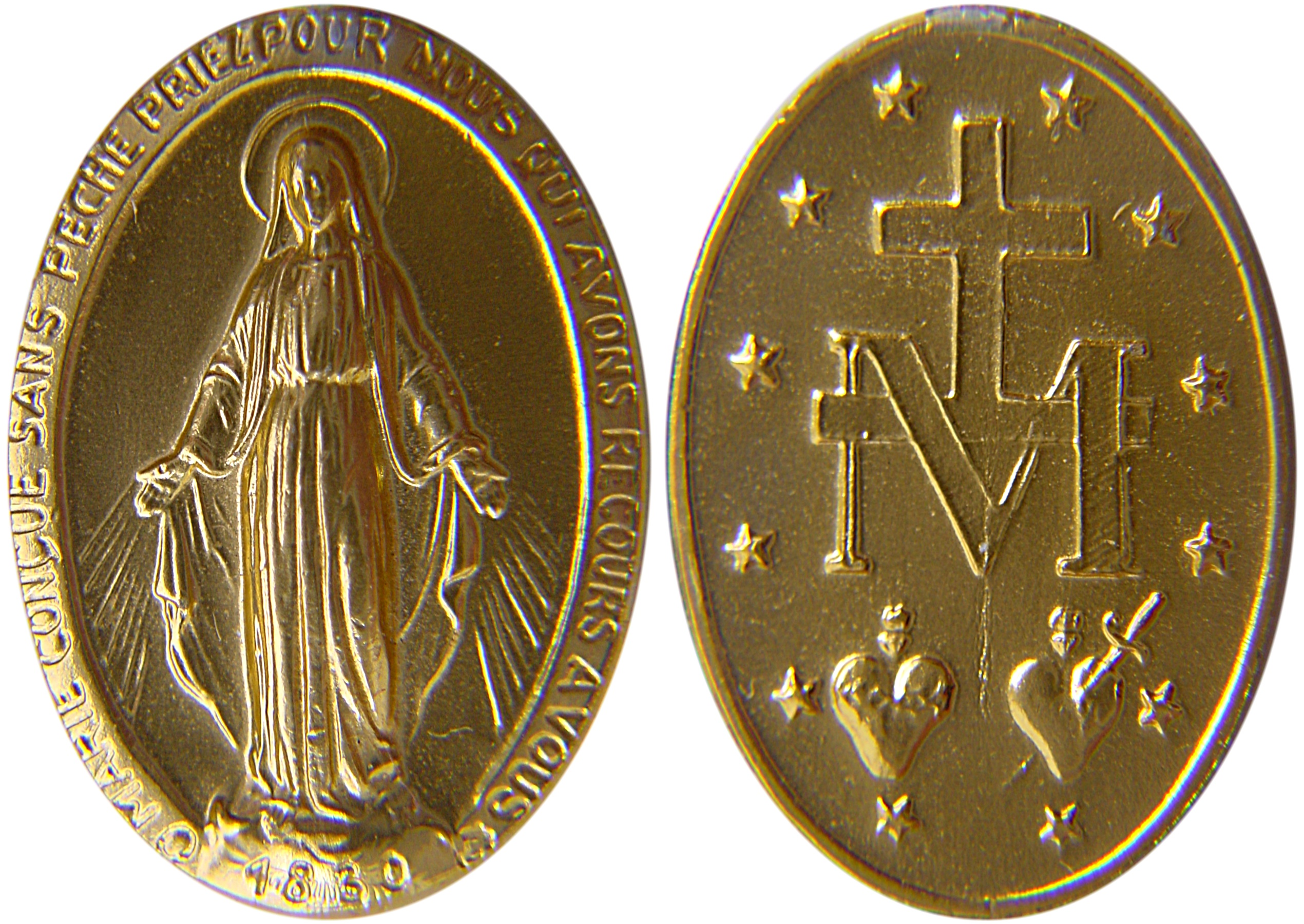
The Sacred Heart crowned with thorns, appearing on the Miraculous Medal

== Sacred Heart imagery ==
The Sacred Heart crowned with thorns is depicted on the reverse side of the Miraculous Medal,

The Carillon-Sacré-Coeur flag has been adopted by the Société Saint-Jean-Baptiste in Québec.

Religious imagery depicting the Sacred Heart is frequently featured in homes. Ireland was consecrated to the Sacred Heart on Passion Sunday 1873 by the bishops of Ireland, which led to the Sacred Heart lamp becoming a common devotional object in Irish homes. Sometimes the image is part of a set, along with the Immaculate Heart of Mary. However, the Sacred Congregation of Rites stated in 1879 that images of the hearts of Jesus or Mary were not appropriate for being placed on the altar for Mass, although are appropriate for "private devotion".

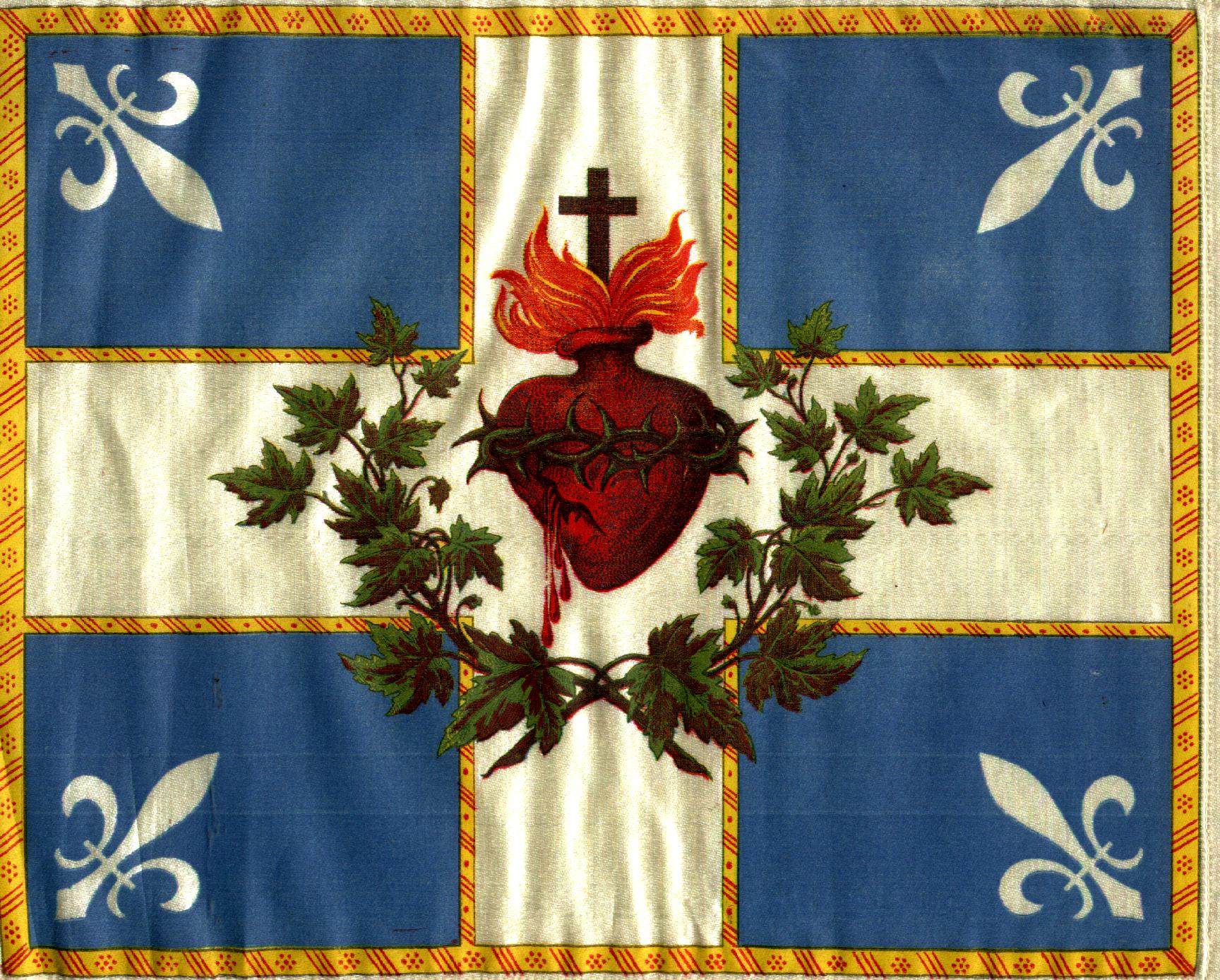
The Carillon-Sacré-Coeur: flag waved by French Canadian Catholics until the 1950s

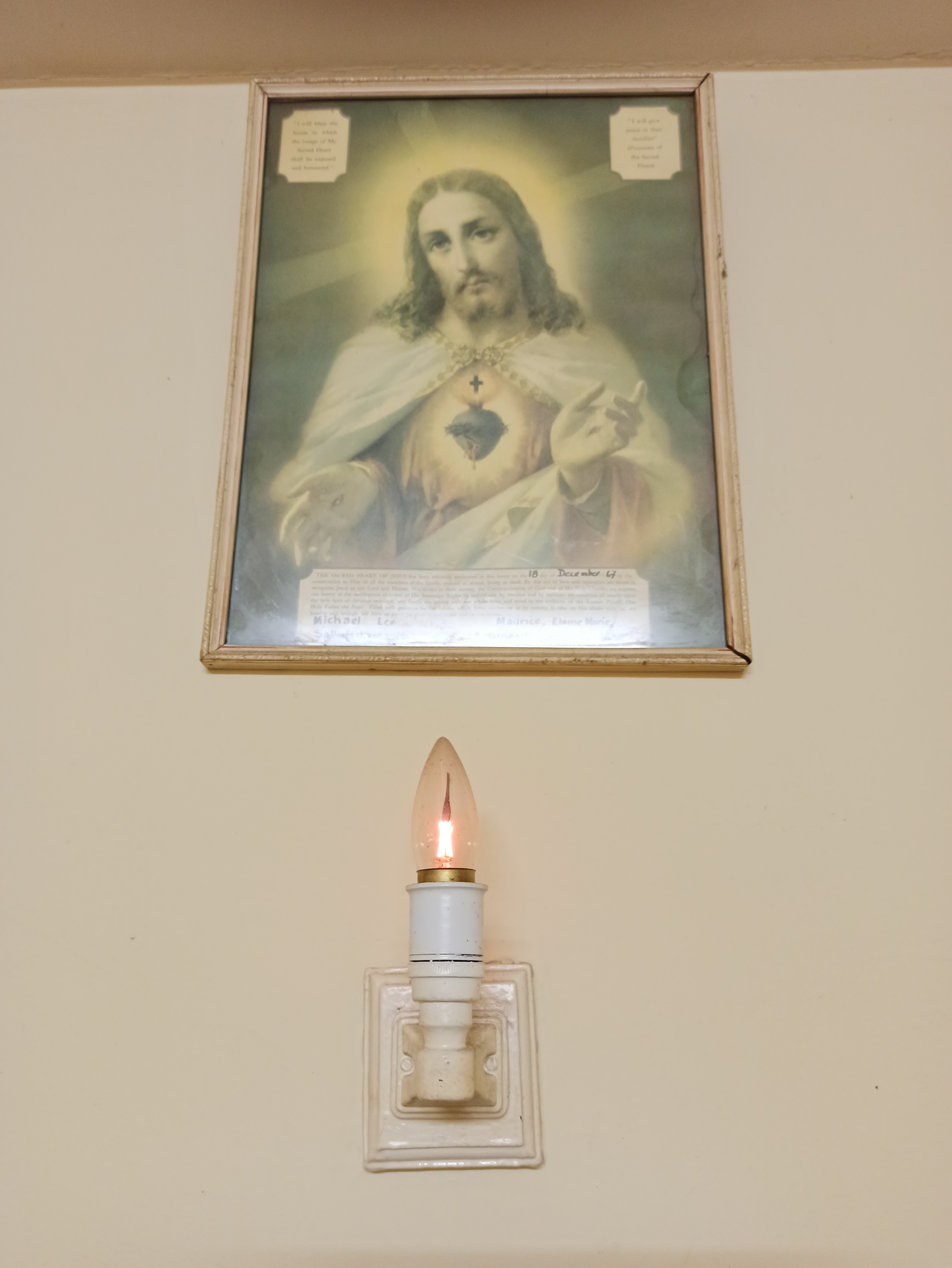
Traditional Irish sacred heart lamp, Tipperary

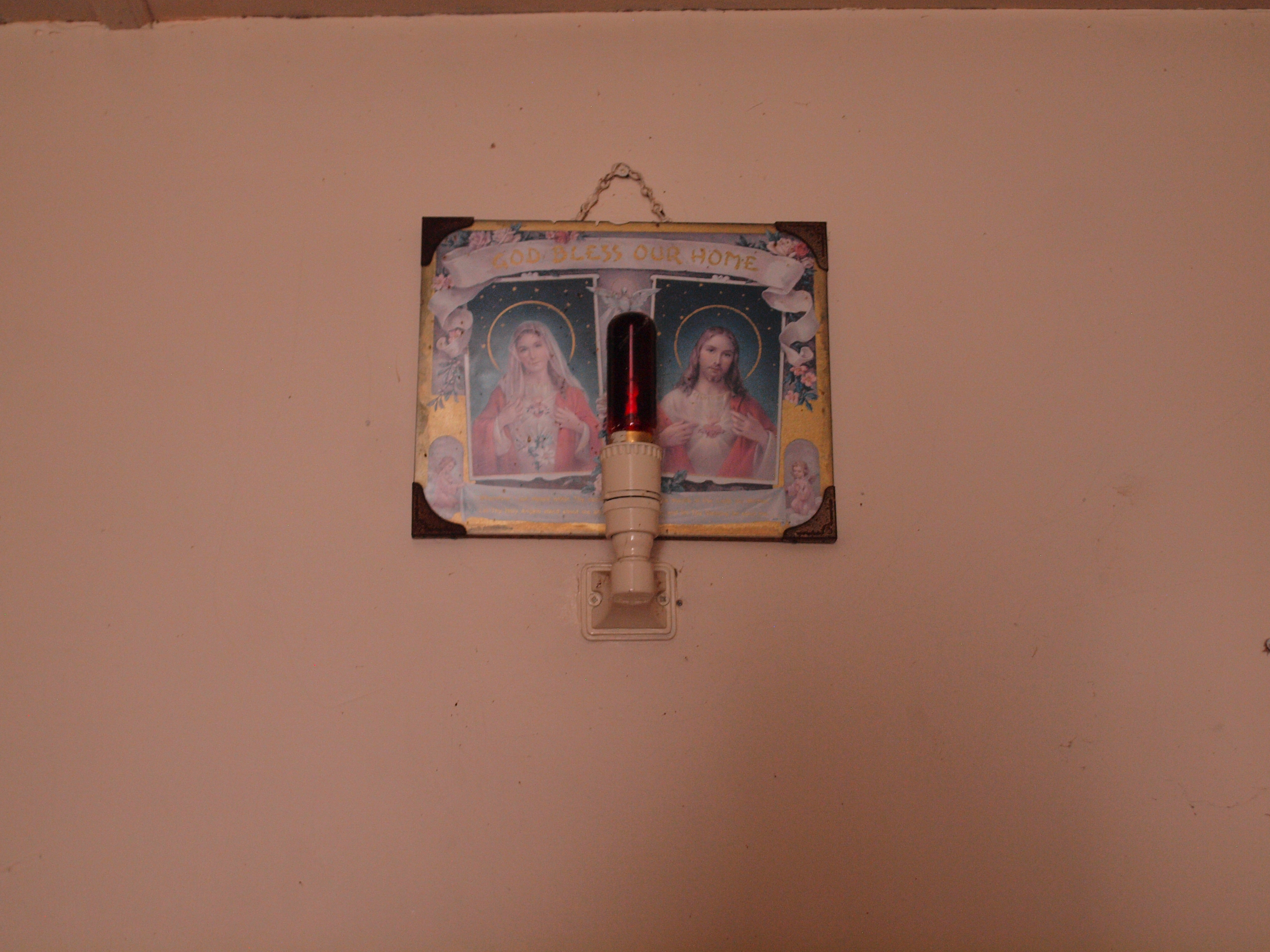
Sacred Heart lamp in County Carlow

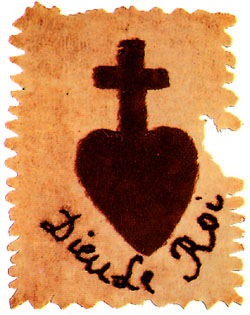
Sacred Heart patch of the French Catholic and Royal Army

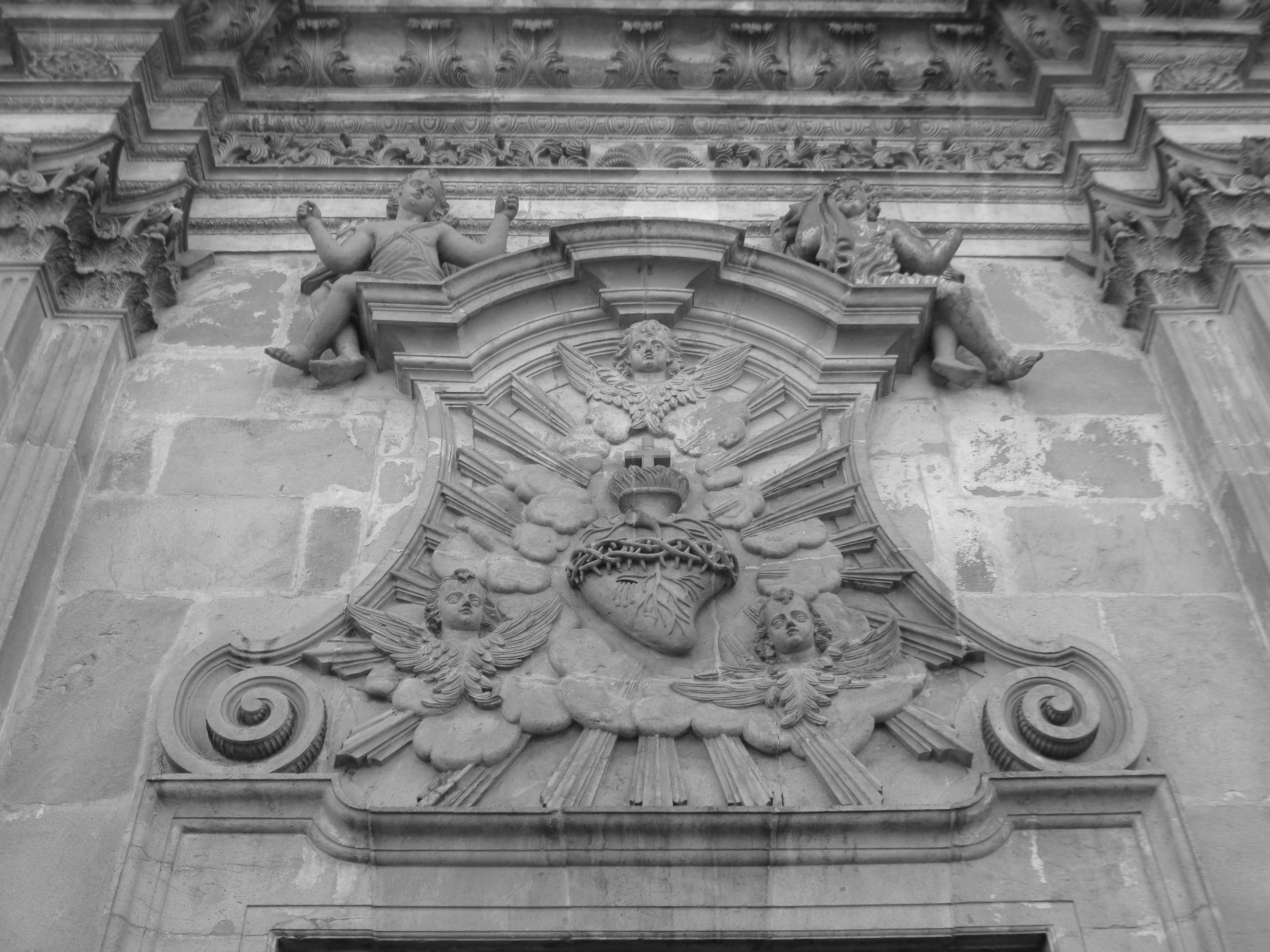
Sacred heart sculpted on the façade of the Church of La Compañía, Quito.

== Institutions and religious congregations ==
Sacred Heart is a name used for many Catholic institutions, including schools, colleges, and hospitals in many countries. It is also the name of many Catholic parishes, and religious congregations.

Peter Coudrin of France founded the Congregation of the Sacred Hearts of Jesus and Mary on 24 December 1800. A religious order of the Latin Church, the order carried out missionary work in Hawaii. Clelia Merloni from Forlì (Italy) founded the Congregation of the Apostles of the Sacred Heart of Jesus in Viareggio, Italy, on 30 May 1894. There are numerous other religious orders named after or inspired by the Sacred Heart: Pope Francis acknowledges that it would be "an endless undertaking" to list them all.

== Specific devotions ==
A number of Catholic saints and religious figures have expressed special devotions to the Sacred Heart. These include Margaret Mary Alacoque, Charles de Foucauld, Thérèse of Lisieux and Josefa Menéndez.

The writings of Josefa Menéndez explain the mercifulness of the Sacred Heart of Jesus.

== Gallery ==
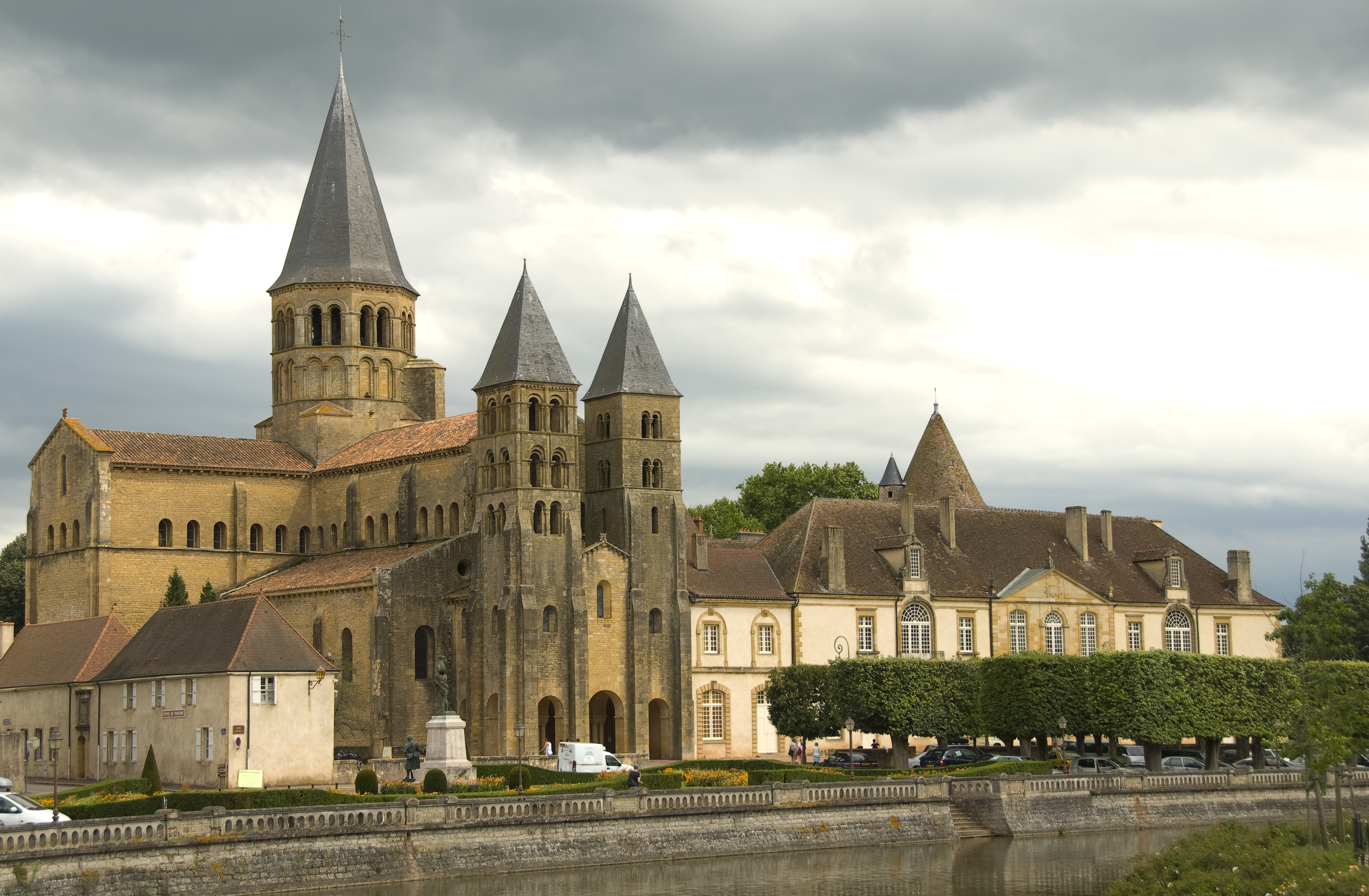
The Basilica of the Sacred Heart in Paray-le-Monial, France

The Estrela Basilica, situated in Lisbon, Portugal, was the first church in the world dedicated to the Sacred Heart of Jesus.

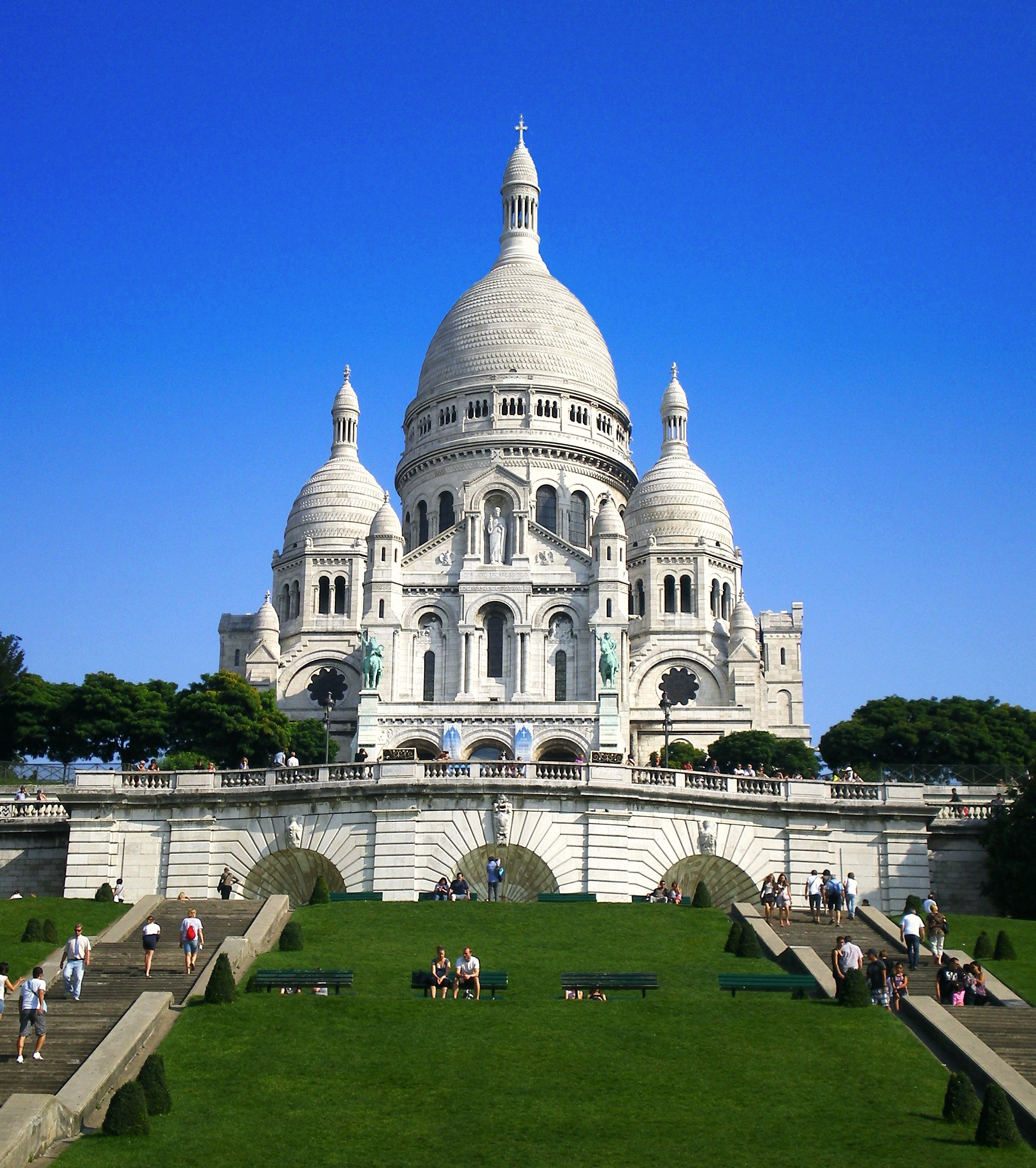
The Basilica of the Sacred Heart in Paris, France

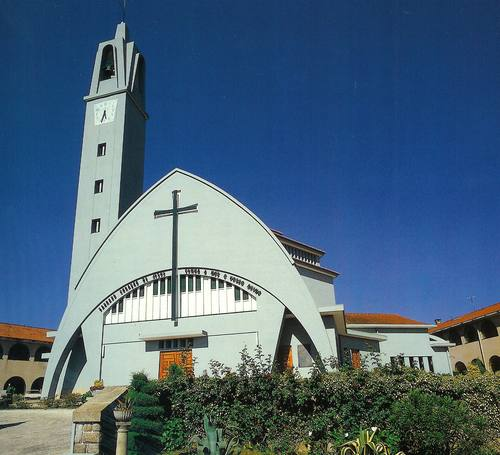
The Church of the Sacred Heart of Jesus in Ermesinde, Portugal

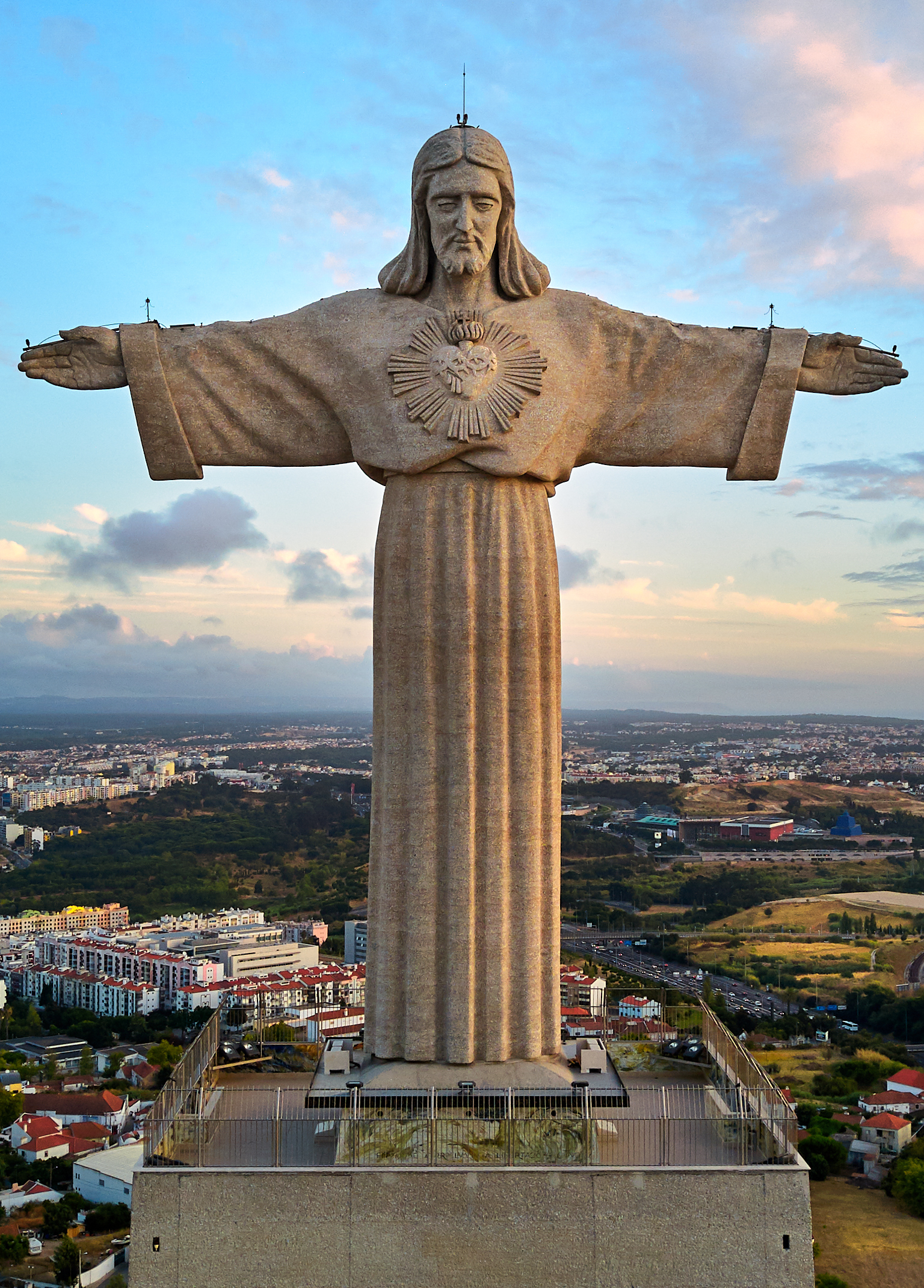
The Sanctuary of Christ the King in Almada, Portugal, a monument dedicated to the Sacred Heart

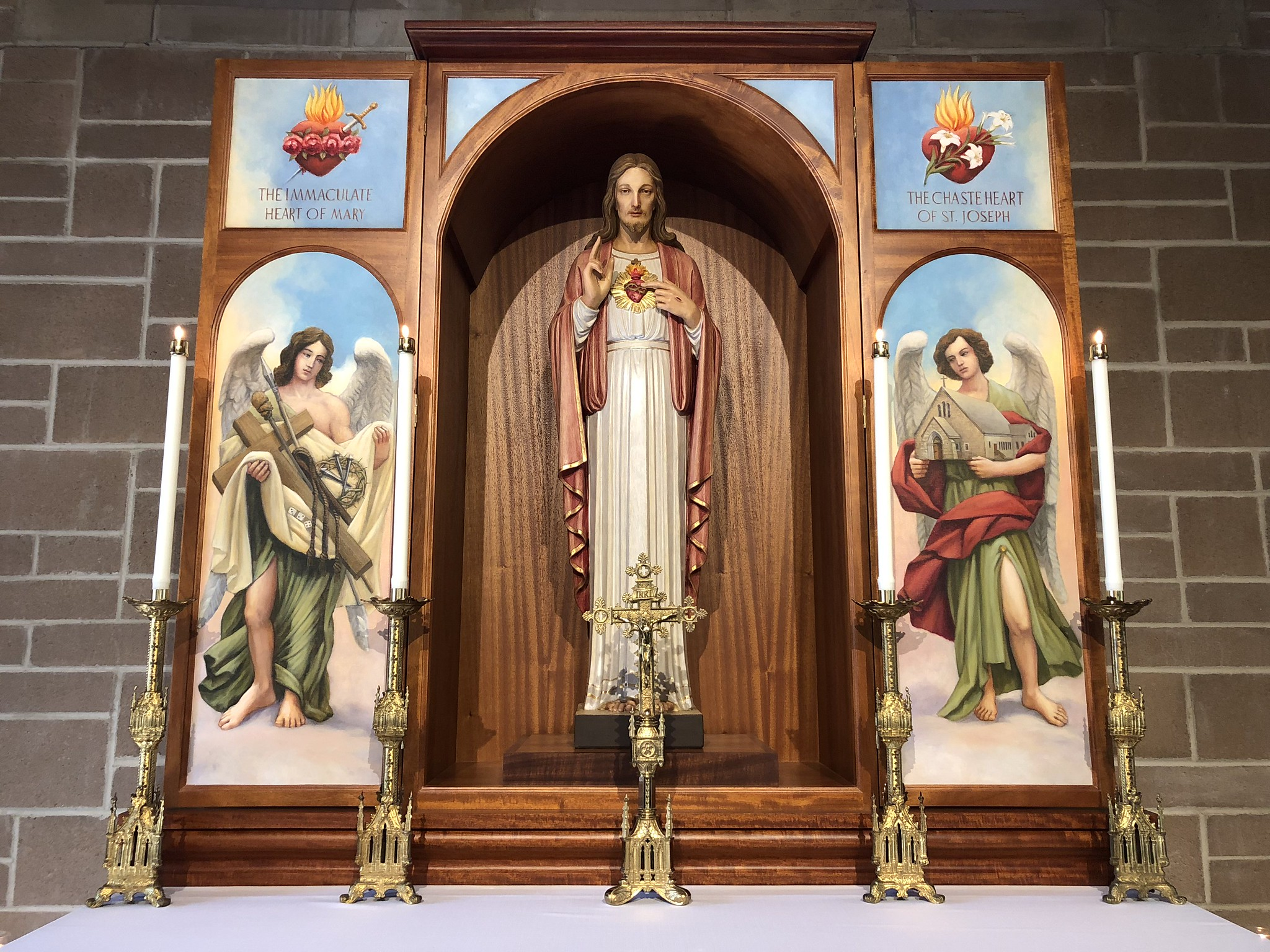
Sacred Heart statue in St. Catherine of Siena Church, Trumbull, Connecticut

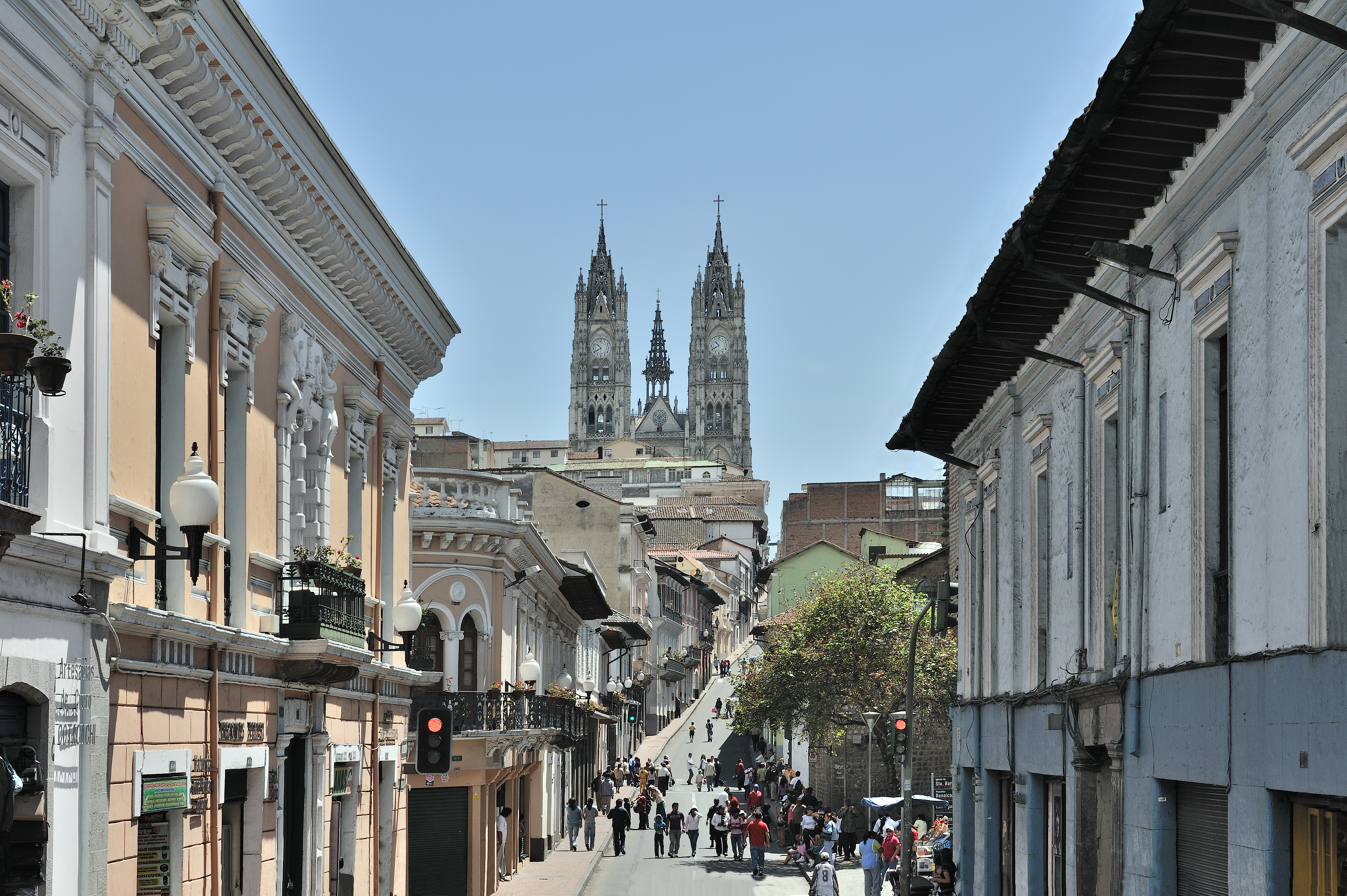
The Basilica of the National Vow in Quito, built to commemorate the consecration of Ecuador to the Sacred Heart of Jesus.

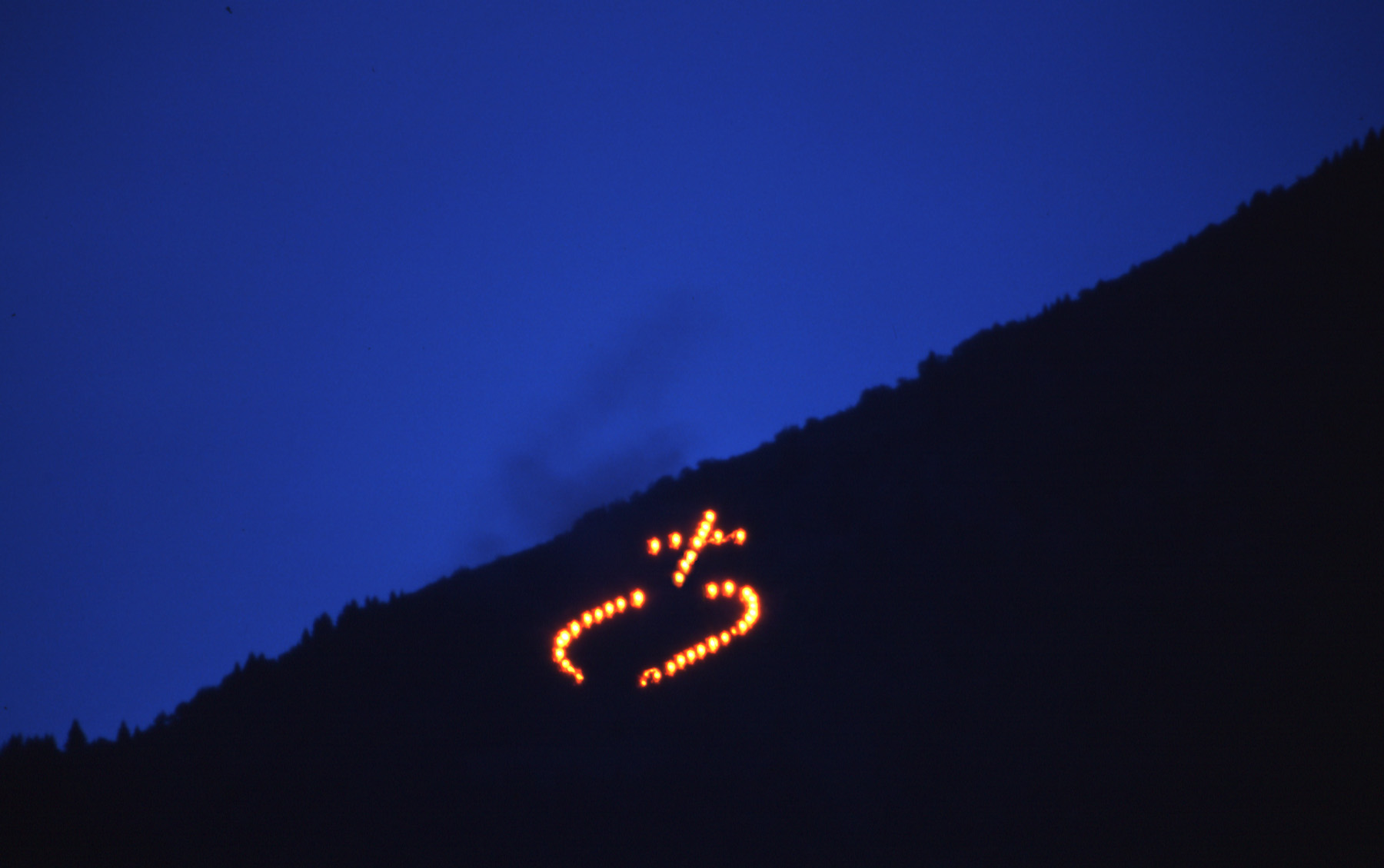
Sacred Heart of Jesus Fire on Ifinger, South Tyrol, Italy.

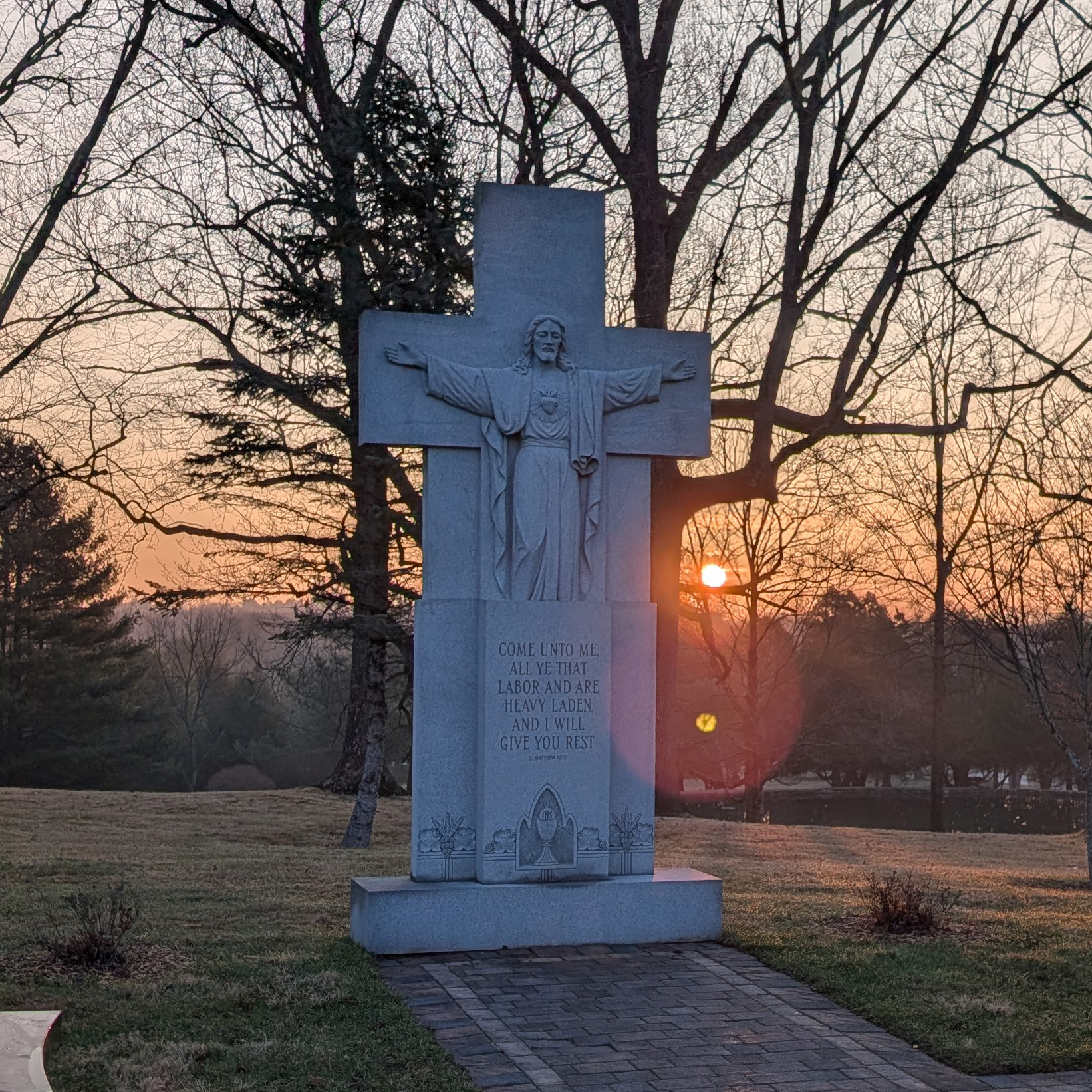
Sacred Heart statue in front of the novitiate and college of Humanities of the Legionaries of Christ

== In Eastern Catholicism ==
Devotion to the Sacred Heart may be found in some Eastern Catholic Churches, particularly the Ukrainian. Others see it as an example of liturgical Latinisation. Many Eastern churches observe a comparable feast of "Jesus, Lover of Mankind", celebrated on July 17.

== See also ==
- Immaculate Heart of Mary
- Chamor Hill
- Chaste Heart of Joseph
- Prayer of Consecration to the Sacred Heart of Jesus

== Sources ==
- Bainvel, Jean Vincent (1910). "Devotion to the Heart of Jesus" . In Herbermann, Charles (ed.). Catholic Encyclopedia. Vol. 7. New York: Robert Appleton Company.
- Chasle, Louis; Sister Mary of the Divine Heart Droste zu Vischering, religious of the Good Shepherd, 1863–1899. Burns & Oates, London, 1906.
