= Miserentissimus Redemptor =

1928 papal encyclical by Pius XI

Miserentissimus Redemptor Latin for 'Most Merciful Redeemer' Encyclical of Pope Pius XI
- Signature date: 8 May 1928
- Subject: Reparation to the Sacred Heart
- Number: 12 of 31 of the pontificate
- Text: In Latin; In English

Miserentissimus Redemptor (English: "Most Merciful Redeemer") is the title of an encyclical written by Pope Pius XI, promulgated on May 8, 1928, on the theology of reparation to the Sacred Heart.

== Content ==
In the opening section of the encyclical, the Pope stated that Jesus Christ had "manifested Himself" to Margaret Mary Alacoque and had "promised her that all those who rendered this honor to His Heart would be endowed with an abundance of heavenly graces".

Referencing Pope Leo XIII's encyclical Annum sacrum, Pius stated, "For as in olden time when mankind came forth from Noe's ark, God set His "bow in the clouds" (Genesis ix, 13), shining as the sign of a friendly covenant; so in the most turbulent times of a more recent age, ... then the most benign Jesus showed his own most Sacred Heart to the nations lifted up as a standard of peace and charity portending no doubtful victory in the combat."

Pius XI said that devotion to the Sacred Heart provided a succinct summary of the entire spiritual life.

For is not the sum of all religion and therefore the pattern of more perfect life, contained in that most auspicious sign and in the form of piety that follows from [devotion to the Sacred Heart] inasmuch as it more readily leads the minds of [all] to an intimate knowledge of Christ Our Lord, and more efficaciously moves their hearts to love him more vehemently and to imitate him more closely?"

Pius raised the importance of the Feast of the Sacred Heart of Jesus as a day of reparation.

The encyclical is supplemented by a "Prayer of Reparation".

Pope Francis, in his encyclical letter on the Sacred Heart (2024) refers to Pius' teaching as an aspect of Christian spirituality which it is "fitting to recover".

== See also ==
- Reparation (theology)
- Quas primas
