= First Fridays Devotion =

Set of Catholic devotions

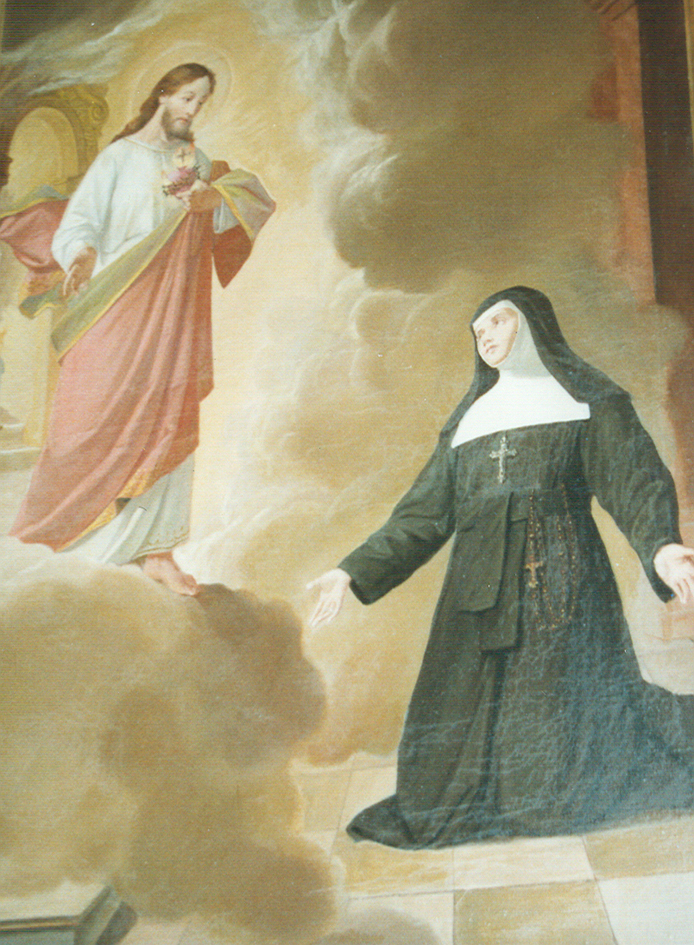
The Sacred Heart appearing to Margaret Mary Alacoque

The First Fridays Devotion, also called the Nine First Fridays Devotion or the Communions of Reparation to the Sacred Heart, is a Catholic devotion in honor of the Sacred Heart of Jesus and to offer reparations for sins to the Blessed Sacrament. It has its origins in the apparitions of Christ at Paray-le-Monial, France, reported by Margaret Mary Alacoque in the 17th century. This devotion to the Sacred Heart was fully approved by the Catholic Church and a "Great Promise" of final penance was made to those who practice the First Fridays Devotion.

== History ==
The Devotion of the Nine First Fridays is based on revelations from Jesus Christ reportedly received by Margaret Mary Alacoque, a Visitation nun, between 1673 and 1675 in Paray-Le-Monial, France. This devotion was revealed to Margaret Mary in the form of a promise of final penance granted to those who accomplish this practice, also known as the "Great Promise". This was done in order to promote reparatory communions and the devotion to the Sacred Heart of Jesus. According to Alacoque writings, Christ said to her :

"In the excess of the mercy of My Heart, I promise you that My all powerful love will grant to all those who will receive Communion on the First Fridays, for nine consecutive months, the grace of final repentance: they will not die in My displeasure, nor without receiving the sacraments; and My Heart will be their secure refuge in that last hour."

== The practice of the First Fridays Devotion ==
The devotion consists of several practices that are performed on the first Fridays of nine consecutive months. On these days, a person is to attend Mass and receive the Eucharist with the intention of honoring the Sacred Heart and making reparation for sins. The nine First Fridays must be consecutive. If the need arises, in order to receive communion in a state of grace, a person should also make use of the sacrament of penance before attending Mass.

In many Catholic communities the practice of the Holy Hour the night before the First Fridays or during the Exposition of the Blessed Sacrament during the First Fridays is encouraged.

== Promises of the devotion to the Sacred Heart of Jesus ==
Several promises were reported by Alacoque for those who are devoted to the Sacred Heart of Jesus. The promises suggest that one "will be disposed to Christian discipleship through frequent reception of the sacraments." The last promise is the promise of final penance granted to those who practice the First Fridays Devotion.

1. I will give them all of the graces necessary for their state of life.
2. I will establish peace in their houses.
3. I will comfort them in all their afflictions.
4. I will be their strength during life and above all during death.
5. I will bestow a large blessing upon all their undertakings.
6. Sinners shall find in My Heart the source and the infinite ocean of mercy.
7. Tepid souls shall grow fervent.
8. Fervent souls shall quickly mount to high perfection.
9. I will bless every place where a picture of My Heart shall be set up and honored.
10. I will give to priests the gift of touching the most hardened hearts.
11. Those who shall promote this devotion shall have their names written in My Heart, never to be blotted out.
12. I promise you in the excessive mercy of My Heart that My all-powerful love will grant to all those who shall receive communion on the First Friday in nine consecutive months the grace of final penance; they shall not die in My disgrace nor without receiving their sacraments; My Divine Heart shall be their safe refuge in this last moment.

== Catholic Church approval ==
Pope Benedict XV inserted the "Great Promise" of the First Fridays Devotion into his Bull of Canonization for Margaret Mary Alacoque on 13 May 1920, encouraging in this way the practice of this act of reparation on the first Fridays in honor of the Sacred Heart.

== Liturgical praxis ==
In 1889, Pope Leo XIII permitted priests and bishops worldwide to offer one morning votive Mass of the Sacred Heart on the first Friday of each month in churches or oratories where special devotions to the Sacred Heart were held, provided no feast of the Lord, double of the first class, or privileged feria, vigil, or octave occurred on that day. This permission was retained in the 1962 Missal, which remains the authorized liturgical text for the extraordinary form of the Roman Rite under the terms of Pope Benedict XVI's Summorum Pontificum, though the rubrics were altered to restrict the use of this permission to first Fridays on liturgical days of the third and fourth class; additionally, the 1962 rubrics allow two such votive Masses to be said on first Fridays, with no requirement for these Masses to be said in the morning (evening Masses having been permitted by Pope Pius XII by his 1953 apostolic constitution Christus Dominus).

No specific permission for use of the votive Mass of the Sacred Heart on first Fridays exists in the rubrics of the Mass of Paul VI, though votive Masses of any kind are permitted on most weekdays in Ordinary Time on which no obligatory memorial, feast, or solemnity occurs.

== See also ==
- First Thursdays Devotion
- First Saturdays Devotion
- Holy Hour
- Feast of the Sacred Heart
- Devotion to the Sacred Heart of Jesus
