= Siegfried Flügge =

German physicist (1912–1997)

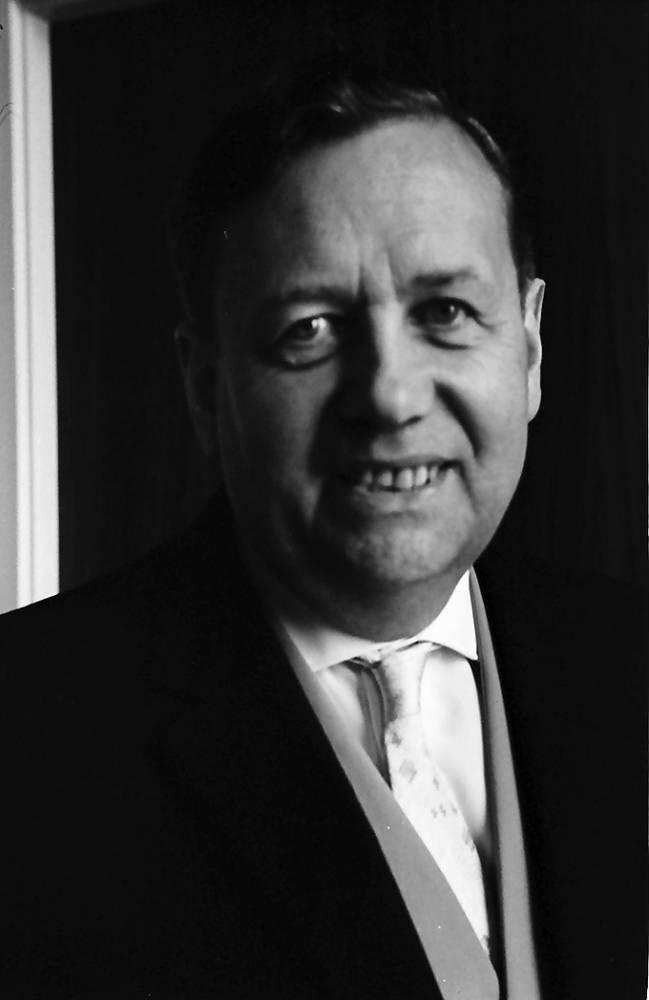
- Born: March 16, 1916; Dresden, Germany
- Died: December 15, 1997 (aged 81); Hinterzarten, Germany
- Education: University of Göttingen (PhD)
- Scientific career
- Fields: Nuclear physics
- Thesis: Der Einfluβ der Neutronen auf den inneren Aufbau der Sterne (1933)
- Doctoral advisor: Max Born

Siegfried Flügge (16 March 1912, in Dresden – 15 December 1997, in Hinterzarten) was a German theoretical physicist who made contributions to nuclear physics and the theoretical basis for nuclear weapons. He worked on the German nuclear energy project. From 1941 onward he was a lecturer at several German universities, and from 1956 to 1984, editor of the 54-volume, prestigious Handbuch der Physik.

== Education ==
From 1929 to 1933, Flügge studied physics at the Technische Hochschule Dresden (after 1961, the Dresden University of Technology) and the Georg-August University of Göttingen. He received his doctorate at the latter, under Max Born, in 1933.

== Career ==
From 1933 to 1935, he was a teaching assistant at the Johann Wolfgang Goethe University Frankfurt am Main. From 1936 to 1937, he was a teaching assistant to Werner Heisenberg at the University of Leipzig. From 1937 to 1942, as successor to Max Delbrück, Flügge was an assistant to Otto Hahn at the Kaiser-Wilhelm Institut für Chemie (KWIC, after World War II reorganized and renamed the Max Planck Institute for Chemistry), in Berlin-Dahlem.

In 1938, Flügge completed his Habilitation at the Technische Hochschule München (today, the Technical University of Munich).

In December 1938, the German chemists Otto Hahn and Fritz Strassmann sent a manuscript to Naturwissenschaften reporting they had detected the element barium after bombarding uranium with neutrons; simultaneously, they communicated these results to Lise Meitner, who had in July of that year fled to The Netherlands and then went to Sweden. Meitner, and her nephew Otto Robert Frisch, correctly interpreted these results as being nuclear fission. Frisch confirmed this experimentally on 13 January 1939. Flügge and Gottfried von Droste, an assistant to Meitner, independently also predicted a large energy release from nuclear fission.

In June and August of the same year, Flügge published two influential articles on the exploitation of nuclear energy. From then he worked on the German nuclear energy project; collaborators on aspects of this project were for a time known collectively as the Uranverein (Uranium Club). Some with whom he collaborated were Carl Friedrich von Weizsäcker and Fritz Houtermans on the theoretical basis of the Uranmaschine (literally uranium machine, i.e., nuclear reactor). Flügge also extended Niels Bohr's and J. A. Wheeler's theory of nuclear fission published in 1939.

The papers by Flügge on the exploitation of nuclear energy were an impetus for action. For example, the Auergesellschaft had a substantial amount of “waste” uranium from which it had extracted radium. After reading Flügge's June 1939 paper in Die Naturwissenschaften on the technical use of nuclear energy from uranium, Nikolaus Riehl, the scientific director at Auergesellschaft, recognized a business opportunity for the company. In July 1939, he went to the Heereswaffenamt (HWA, Army Ordnance Office) to discuss the production of uranium. The HWA was interested.

In 1940, on the initiative of Rudolf Tomaschek, despite Wilhelm Müller's objection, Flügge lectured at the Technische Hochschule München on theoretical physics during the winter semester. From 1941, he was a lecturer at the Friedrich-Wilhelms-Universität (today, the Humboldt University of Berlin).

In 1944, Flügge was an ordinarius professor at the University of Königsberg. From 1945 to 1947, he took a position at his alma mater, the University of Göttingen. From 1947 to 1949, he had a position at the Philipps-Universität Marburg. From 1949 to 1950, he was a visiting professor at the University of Wisconsin–Madison and in 1953 at the Carnegie Institute of Technology (now Carnegie Mellon University). Later, he was at the Albert-Ludwigs-Universität Freiburg.

From 1956 to 1984, Flügge was editor of the 54-volume, prestigious Handbuch der Physik (Encyclopedia of Physics) published by Springer-Verlag.

== Internal report ==
The following reports were published in Kernphysikalische Forschungsberichte (Research Reports in Nuclear Physics), an internal publication of the German Uranverein. The reports were classified Top Secret, they had very limited distribution, and the authors were not allowed to keep copies. The reports were confiscated under the Allied Operation Alsos and sent to the United States Atomic Energy Commission for evaluation. In 1971, the reports were declassified and returned to Germany. The reports are available at the Karlsruhe Nuclear Research Center and the American Institute of Physics.

- Siegfried Flügge Zur spontanene Spaltung von Uran und seinen nachbarelementen G-140 (27 January 1942)
- Kurt Sauerwein and Siegfried Flügge Untersuchungen I und II über den Resonanzeinfang von Neutronen beim Uran G-185 (28 January 1942)

== Family ==
He was the younger brother of Wilhelm Flügge.

== Selected publications ==
=== Articles ===
- Siegfried Flügge Kann der Energieinhalt der Atomkerne technisch nutzbar gemacht werden?, Die Naturwissenschaften Volume 27, Issues 23/24, 402–410 (9 June 1939).
- Siegfried Flügge Die Ausnutzung der Atomenergie. Vom Laboratoriumsversuch zur Uranmaschine – Forschungsergebnisse in Dahlem, Deutsche Allgemeine Zeitung No. 387, Supplement (15 August 1939). English translation: Document #74 Siegfried Flügge: Exploiting Atomic Energy. From the Laboratory Experiment to the Uranium Machine – Research Results in Dahlem [August 15, 1939] in Hentschel, Klaus (Editor) and Ann M. Hentschel (Editorial Assistant and Translator) Physics and National Socialism: An Anthology of Primary Sources (Birkhäuser, 1996) pp 197–206. [This article is Flügge's popularized version of the June 1939 article in Die Naturwissenschaften.]
- Siegfried Flügge and Gottfried von Droste Energetische Betrachtungen zu der Entstehung von Barium bei der Neutronenbestrahlung von Uran, Zeitschrift für Physikalische Chemie B Volume 4, 274–280 (1939). Received on 22 January 1939.

=== Books ===
- Erwin Madelung, Karl Böhle, and Siegfried Flügge Mathematischen Hilfsmittel des Physikers (Mathematical Tools for the Physicist), Dritte vermehrte und verbesserte Auflage) (Dover, 1943)
- Walther Bothe and Siegfried Flügge. Nuclear Physics and Cosmic Rays: FIAT Review of German Science 1939-1946. 2 volumes. 230; 198 pages. (Office of Military Government for Germany, 1948)
- Siegfried Flügge Theoretische Optik. Die Entwicklung einer physikalischen Theorie (Wolfenbüttler Verlagsanstalt, 1948)
- Siegfried Flügge Bücher der Mathematik und Naturwissenschaften (Wolfenbutteler-Verlags-Anstalt, 1948)
- Siegfried Flügge and Hans Marschall Rechenmethoden Der Quantentheorie (Springer Verlag, 1952)
- Siegfried Flügge and Hans Marschall Rechenmethoden der Quantentheorie. Dargestellt in Aufgaben und Lösungen. Erster Teil: Elementare Quantenmechanik. (Springer-Verlag, 1952)
- Siegfried Flügge Handbuch der Physik. Bd. 7. 1. Kristallphysik 1 (Springer Verlag, 1955)
- Siegfried Flügge Handbuch der Physik. Bd. 1. Mathematische Methoden 1 (Springer Verlag, 1956)
- Siegfried Flügge Lehrbuch der Theoretischen Physik (in 5 Bänden). Band 1: Einführung - Elementare Mechanik und Kontinuumsphysik. (Springer, 1961)
- Siegfried Flügge Lehrbuch der Theoretischen Physik. Bd. III: Klassische Physik II. Das Maxwellsche Feld. Bln. (Springer, 1961)
- Siegfried Flügge Lehrbuch der Theoretischen Physik (in 5 Bänden). Band 4: Quantentheorie I. (Springer, 1964)
- Siegfried Flügge Rechenmethoden der Quantentheorie;Elementare Quantenmechanik - Dargestellt in Aufgaben und Lösungen (Springer Verlag, 1965)
- Siegfried Flügge Lehrbuch der Theoretischen Physik Band II - Klassische Physik I Mechanik Der Geordneten und Ungeordneten Bewegungen (Springer, 1967)
- Siegfried Flügge Wege und Ziele der modernen Physik. (Schulz Freiburg, 1969)
- Siegfried Flügge Practical Quantum Mechanics - Volume 1 and Volume 2 (Springer, 1971)
- Siegfried Flügge Wege und Ziele der Physik (Springer-Verlag, 1974)
- Siegfried Flügge Practical Quantum Mechanics (Springer, 1998)
