= Gottfried von Droste =

German chemist (1908–1992)

Gottfried Freiherr von Droste (1908–1992), a.k.a. Gottfried Freiherr von Droste zu Vischering-Padberg, was a German physical chemist. He worked at the Kaiser Wilhelm Institute for Chemistry (KWIC). He independently predicted that nuclear fission would release a large amount of energy. During World War II, he participated in the German nuclear energy project, also known as the Uranverein (Uranium Society or Uranium Club). In the latter years of the war, he worked at the Reichsuniversität Straßburg. After the war, he worked at the Physikalisch-Technische Bundesanstalt (Federal Physical and Technical Institute and also held a position at the Technical University of Braunschweig.

He was a Freiherr of the Westphalian noble family Droste zu Vischering.

== Education ==
From 1926 to 1933, Droste studied at Heidelberg University, the Ludwig-Maximilians-Universität München, and at the Friedrich Wilhelm University of Berlin, at which he received his doctorate in 1933. His thesis advisor was Lise Meitner, who was an adjunct professor (nichtbeamteter außerordentlicher Professor) at the Friedrich Wilhelm University of Berlin and directed doctoral research in her own section at the Kaiser-Wilhelm-Institut für Chemie, in Berlin-Dahlem.

== Career ==
From 1933, von Droste was a member of the Sturmabteilung (SA). From 1937, he was a member of the Nationalsozialistische Deutsche Arbeiterpartei (NSDAP, National Socialist Workers Party).

From 1933 to 1942, von Droste was a scientific assistant (Mitarbeiter) at the KWIC, where Otto Hahn was the director and until July 13, 1938 Lise Meitner headed a department. While at the KWIC, Droste contributed to the German nuclear energy project, also known as the Uranverein (Uranium Club).

In December 1938, the German chemists Otto Hahn and Fritz Strassmann sent a manuscript to Naturwissenschaften reporting they had detected the element barium after bombarding uranium with neutrons; simultaneously, they communicated these results to Lise Meitner, who had in July of that year fled to the Netherlands and then went to Sweden. Meitner, and her nephew Otto Robert Frisch, correctly interpreted these results as being nuclear fission. Frisch confirmed this experimentally on 13 January 1939. Droste and Siegfried Flügge, an assistant to Hahn, independently also predicted a large energy release from nuclear fission.

From 1942 to 1944, von Droste was at the Reichsuniversität Straßburg, which had been founded in 1941 in German re-occupied Alsace, formerly part of France. He held his position there until 1944, when the Allied military forces liberated Strasbourg from German occupation. From 1944 to 1945, he was at Walther Bothe's Institute for Physics of the Kaiser-Wilhelm Institut für medizinische Forschung in Heidelberg.

After World War II, the denazification process began. When Droste faced the proceedings, he turned to Werner Heisenberg, a prominent member of the Uranverein, for testamentary support – a document known as a Persilschein (whitewash certificate). Heisenberg was a particularly powerful writer of these documents, as he had never been a member of the NSDAP, he had publicly clashed with the NSDAP and the Schutzstaffel (SS), and he had been appointed by the British occupation authorities to the chair for theoretical physics and the directorship of the Max Planck Institute for Physics then in Göttingen. Heisenberg wrote the document. In February 1947, Droste also requested support from Meitner; for complex reasons, she provided a document carefully vouching for his behavior without commenting on his character. Hahn too provided a Persilschein for von Droste, but Hahn also sent a critical letter to von Droste.

From 1946 to 1951, von Droste was in the Physics Department of Heidelberg University. From 1951 until his retirement in 1973, he was employed at the Physikalisch-Technische Bundesanstalt (PTB, Federal Physical and Technical Institute), in Braunschweig. He also held a position at the Technische Universität Braunschweig from 1967 to 1972 and was Regierungsdirektor (Government Director) from 1951 to 1973.

== Internal reports ==
The following reports were published in Kernphysikalische Forschungsberichte (Research Reports in Nuclear Physics), an internal publication of the German Uranverein. The reports were classified Top Secret, they had very limited distribution, and the authors were not allowed to keep copies. The reports were confiscated under the Allied Operation Alsos and sent to the United States Atomic Energy Commission for evaluation. In 1971, the reports were declassified and returned to Germany. The reports are available at the Karlsruhe Nuclear Research Center and the American Institute of Physics.

- Gottfried von Droste Bericht über einen Versuch mit 2t Natriumuranat G-24 (24 September 1940)
- Gottfried von Droste Über den Spaltprozess bei Präparat 38 G-78 (1941)

== Selected Literature by Droste ==
- Gottfried von Droste Über die Anzahl der Ausschläge eines Zählrohres bei Bestrahlung mit γ-Strahlen verschiedener Wellenlänge, Zeitschrift für Physik Volume 100, Numbers 9–10, 529–533 (1936). Received on 15 March 1936. The author was identified as being at the physikalisch-radioaktive Abteilung, Kaiser Wilhelm-Institut für Chemie, Berlin-Dahlem.
- Siegfried Flügge and Gottfried von Droste Energetische Betrachtungen zu der Entstehung von Barium bei der Neutronenbestrahlung von Uran, Zeitschrift für Physikalische Chemie B Volume 4, 274–280 (1939). Received on 22 January 1939.
- Gottfried von Droste and Hermann Reddemann Über die beim Zerspalten des Urankerns auftrentnden Neutronen, Die Naturwissenschaften Volume 27, 371–372 (1939)
- Entries in Microsoft Academic Search.

== Bibliography ==
- Hentschel, Klaus (editor) and Ann M. Hentschel (editorial assistant and translator) Physics and National Socialism: An Anthology of Primary Sources (Birkhäuser, 1996) ISBN 0-8176-5312-0. [This book is a collection of 121 primary German documents relating to physics under National Socialism. The documents have been translated and annotated, and there is a lengthy introduction to put them into perspective.]
- Kind, Dieter Persönliches: Gottfried von Droste zum Gedenken (March 1, 1993) in: Physikalische Blätter Volume: 49 Issue: 3 pp 204 – 204.
- Sime, Ruth Lewin Lise Meitner: A Life in Physics (California, paperback edition, 1997)
- Sime, Ruth Lewin The Politics of Memory: Otto Hahn and the Third Reich, Physics in Perspective Volume 8, 3–51 (2006)
- Walker, Mark German National Socialism and the Quest for Nuclear Power 1939–1949 (Cambridge, 1993) ISBN 0-521-43804-7
- Walker, Mark Otto Hahn: Responsibility and Repression, Physics in Perspective Volume 8, 116–163 (2006)
