= Mary of the Divine Heart =

19th-century German religious sister

Blessed Mary of the Divine Heart
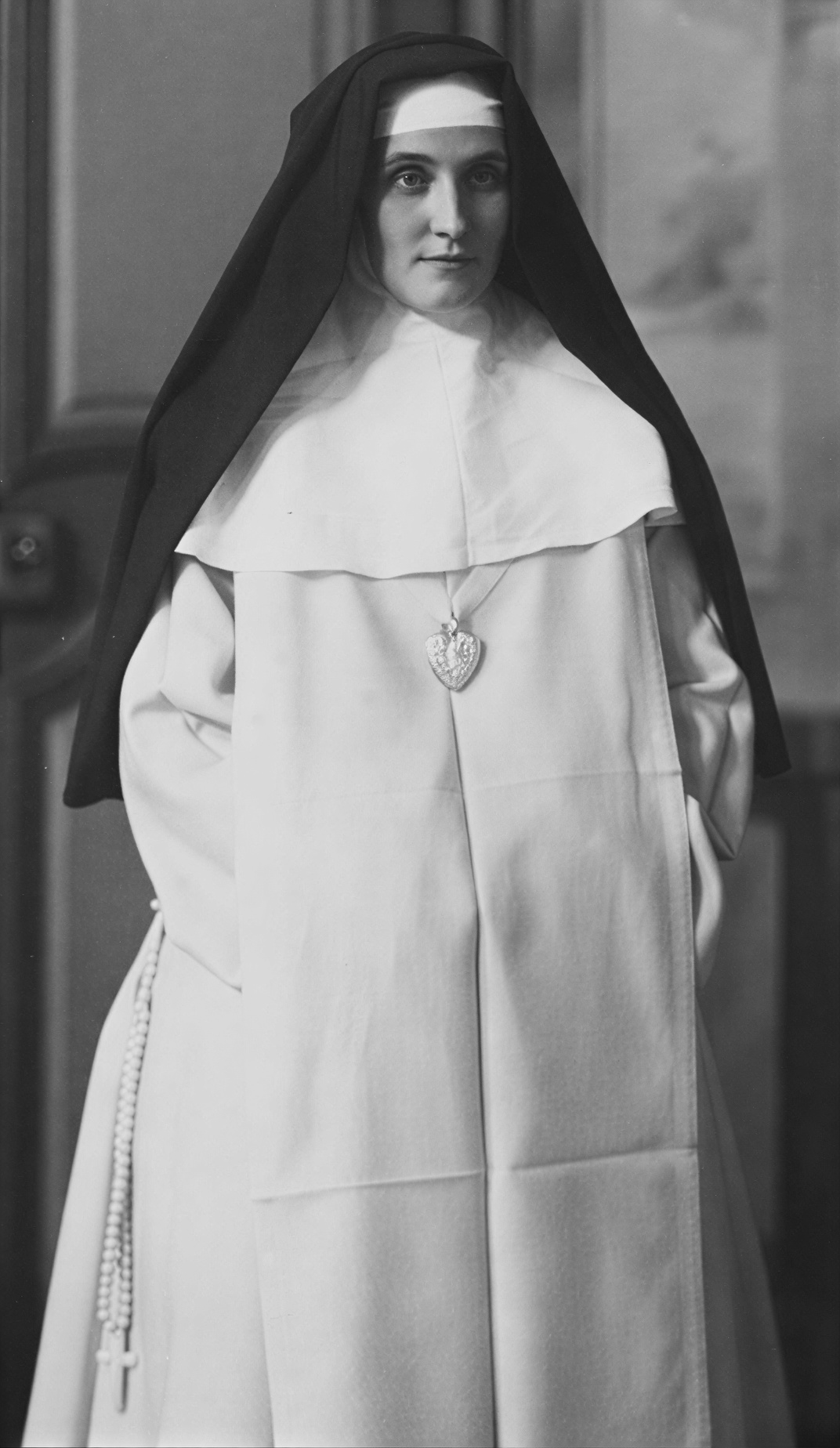
- Portrait as Mother Superior of the Good Shepherd Convent in Porto, Portugal

Virgin
- Born: Maria Droste zu Vischering; 8 September 1863; Münster, Kingdom of Prussia
- Residence: Convent of the Good Shepherd Sisters in Porto (until her death)
- Died: 8 June 1899 (aged 35); Porto, Portugal
- Venerated in: Catholic Church
- Beatified: 1 November 1975, St. Peter's Square by Pope Paul VI
- Major shrine: Church of the Sacred Heart of Jesus (Ermesinde)
- Feast: 8 June
- Patronage: Priests and devotees of the Sacred Heart of Jesus

Mary of the Divine Heart (Münster, 8 September 1863 – Porto, 8 June 1899), born Maria Droste zu Vischering, was a German religious sister of the Congregation of Our Lady of Charity of the Good Shepherd. The former noblewoman is best known for having influenced Pope Leo XIII to consecrate the world to the Sacred Heart of Jesus. Pope Leo XIII called the solemn consecration "the greatest act of my pontificate".

She was beatified by Pope Paul VI in St. Peter's Square on 1 November 1975.

== Birth ==
Maria Anna Johanna Franziska Theresia Antonia Huberta Droste zu Vischering was born with her twin brother Max (Maximilian Droste zu Vischering) on 8 September 1863, the feast of the Nativity of the Blessed Virgin Mary, in the Erbdrostenhof Palace, in Münster, the capital city of Westphalia, Germany.

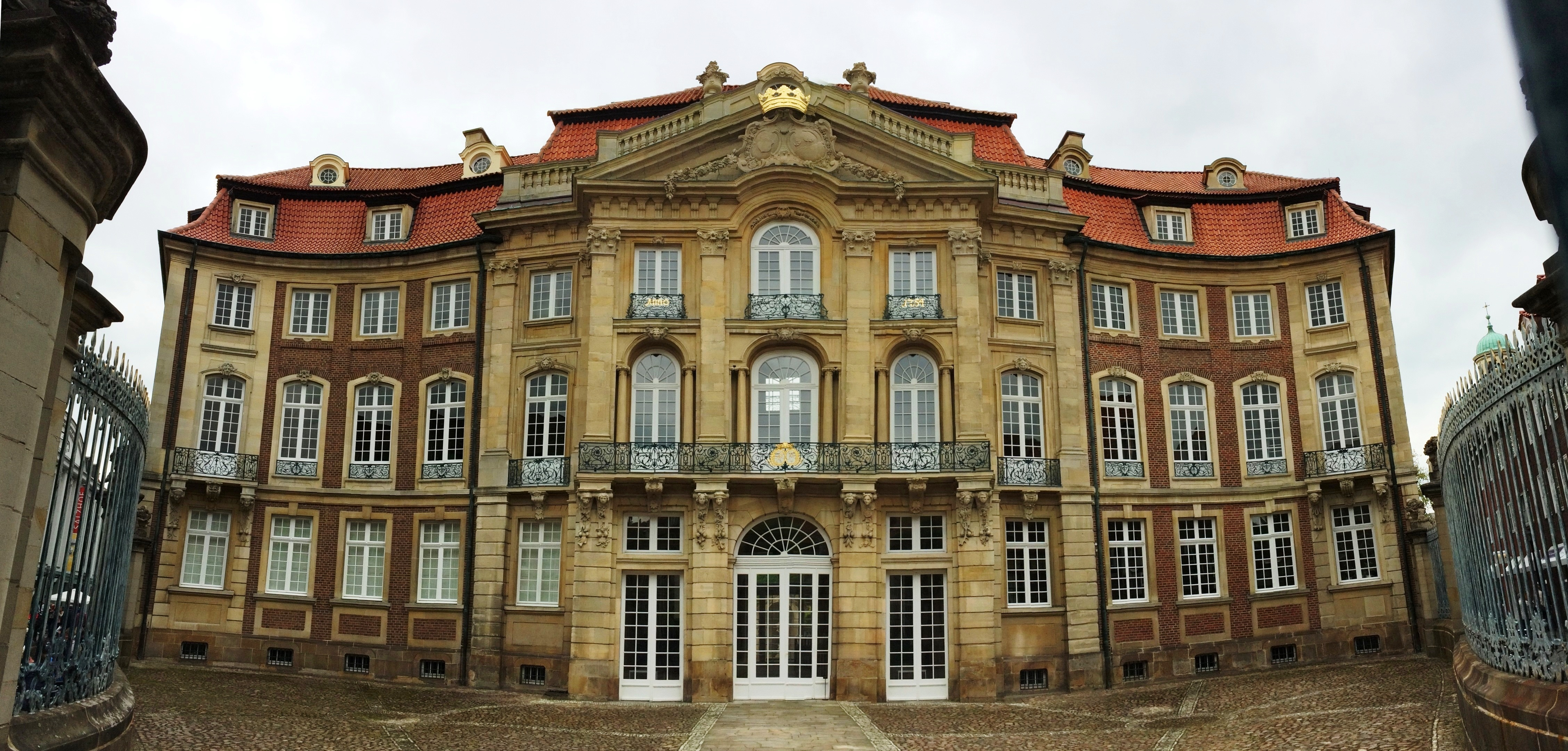
Erbdrostenhof Palace (in Münster, Germany), the birthplace of Maria Droste zu Vischering

She was a daughter of a wealthy, noble German family, which distinguished itself by its fidelity to the Catholic Church during the persecution of the Kulturkampf. Her parents were Klemens Heidenreich Franz Hubertus Eusebius Maria, the count Droste zu Vischering, and Helene Clementine Maria Anna Sybille Huberta Antonia, the countess of Galen. Because of the fragility of her health, Droste zu Vischering was baptized immediately after birth.

== Early years ==
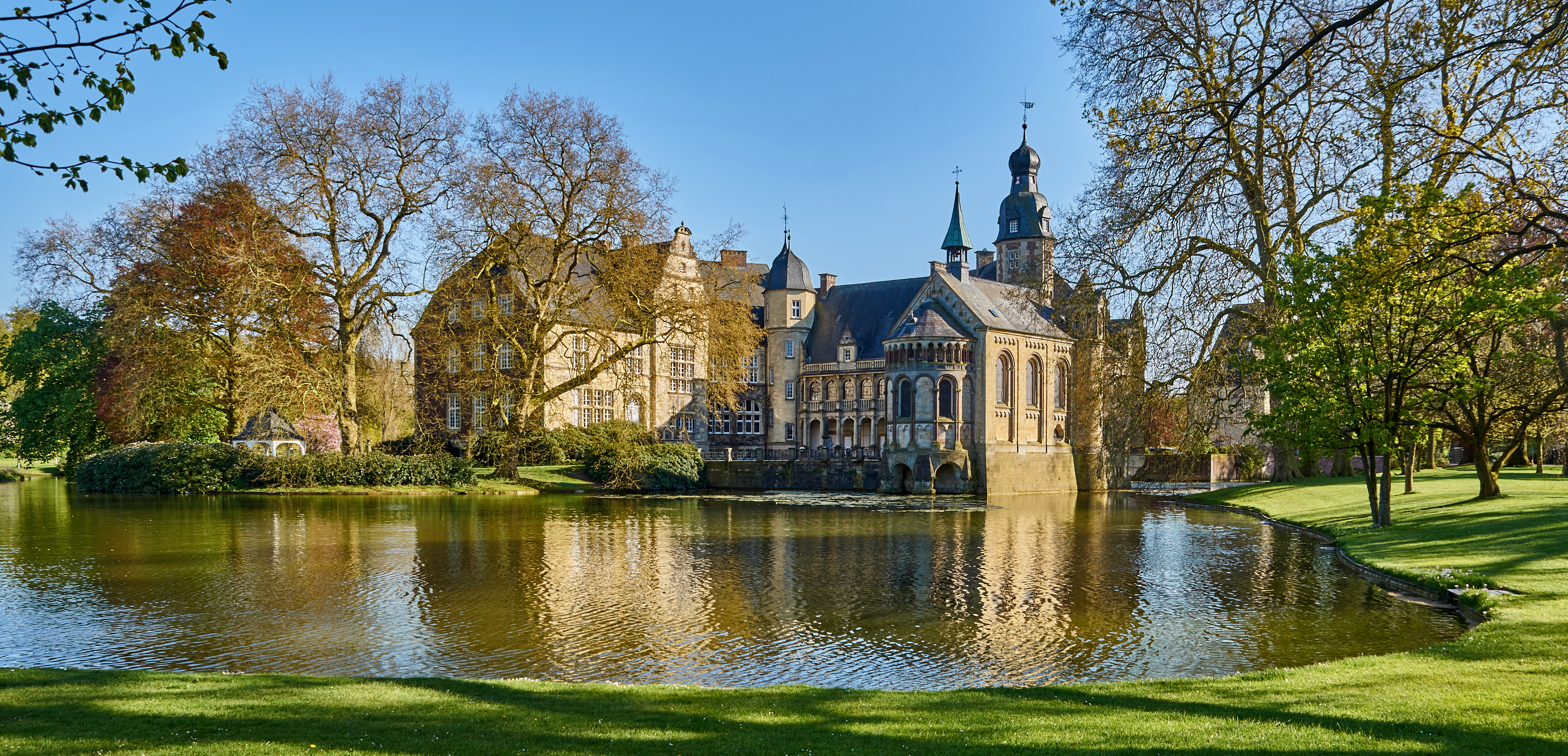
Castle of Darfeld, where Maria Droste zu Vischering spent her childhood

Maria Droste zu Vischering spent her childhood with her family in the Castle of Darfeld, in Rosendahl near Münster, and was a child full of life. Vischering was taught at home by governesses. On 25 April 1875, Maria and her brother Max received their First Communion. In April 1879, Droste zu Vischering continued her education at the boarding school of the Sacré-Coeur Sisters in Riedenburg, Bavaria. While there, she heard a homily on Psalm 45: "Listen, my daughter, and understand; pay me careful heed. Forget your people and your father's house, that the king might desire your beauty". Droste zu Vischering decided that she should become a religious.

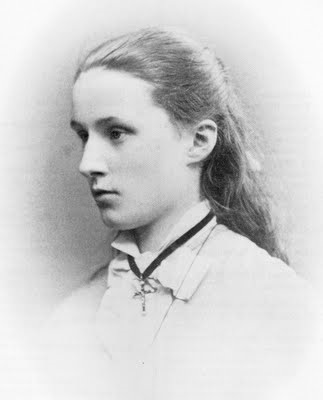
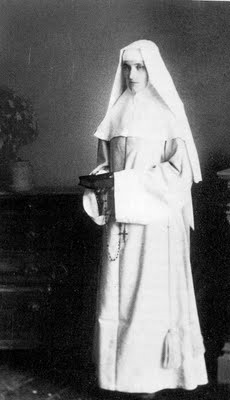
Maria Droste zu Vischering at 15 years old in Darfeld Castle (1878) and as a novice in Münster (1889)

While at school, she contracted pneumonia and, shortly before her 18th birthday, returned home to recover. In 1883, at the chapel of the Castle of Darfeld, she is said to have had a vision of Jesus Christ who told her: "Thou shalt be the wife of my heart". On 5 August of that same year, on the Silver Jubilee of her parents' marriage, Maria told them of her desire to become a religious.

== Religious life ==
In 1888, she visited the Hospital of Darfeld, founded by her father, with her mother and encountered a girl involved in a scandal. Maria Droste zu Vischering reached out to the unfortunate. That episode can be considered her first contact with the charism of the Sisters of the Good Shepherd. In the parish church, a short time later, she again heard the voice of Jesus, who told her: "You must enter the convent of the Good Shepherd". On 21 November 1888, at the age of 25, she joined that congregation. When she received the religious habit, she received the religious name Mary of the Divine Heart. Her initial duties were to attend to visitors as the doorkeeper.

For Mary of the Divine Heart, the devotion to the Heart of Christ always merged with the devotion to the Blessed Sacrament: "I could never separate the devotion to the Heart of Jesus from the devotion to the Blessed Sacrament, and I will never be able to explain how and how much the Sacred Heart of Jesus deigned to favour me in the Blessed Sacrament of the Eucharist."

In 1891, she devoted herself to the girls sent to the Good Shepherd Sisters in Münster for rehabilitation and care. With an ardent love for youth ministry, she maintained that "the most needy, the most miserable, the most forsaken are the children I love best."

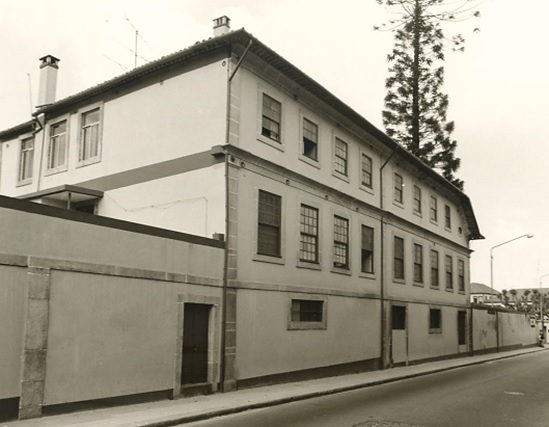
Convent of the Good Shepherd in Porto

Mary of the Divine Heart spent only five years in Münster because she was called by obedience to a special mission. In 1894, at the age of 31, she was sent to Portugal, where she was initially sent as assistant to the Mother superior of the convent in Lisbon. From February to May 1894, Sister Mary remained in the Portuguese capital but was then appointed to the office of the mother superior of the convent in Porto. The house sheltered over 100 girls, most of whom came from poor families and were living on the streets. Around this time, she began to develop symptoms of myelitis.

== Consecration of the world to the Sacred Heart of Jesus ==
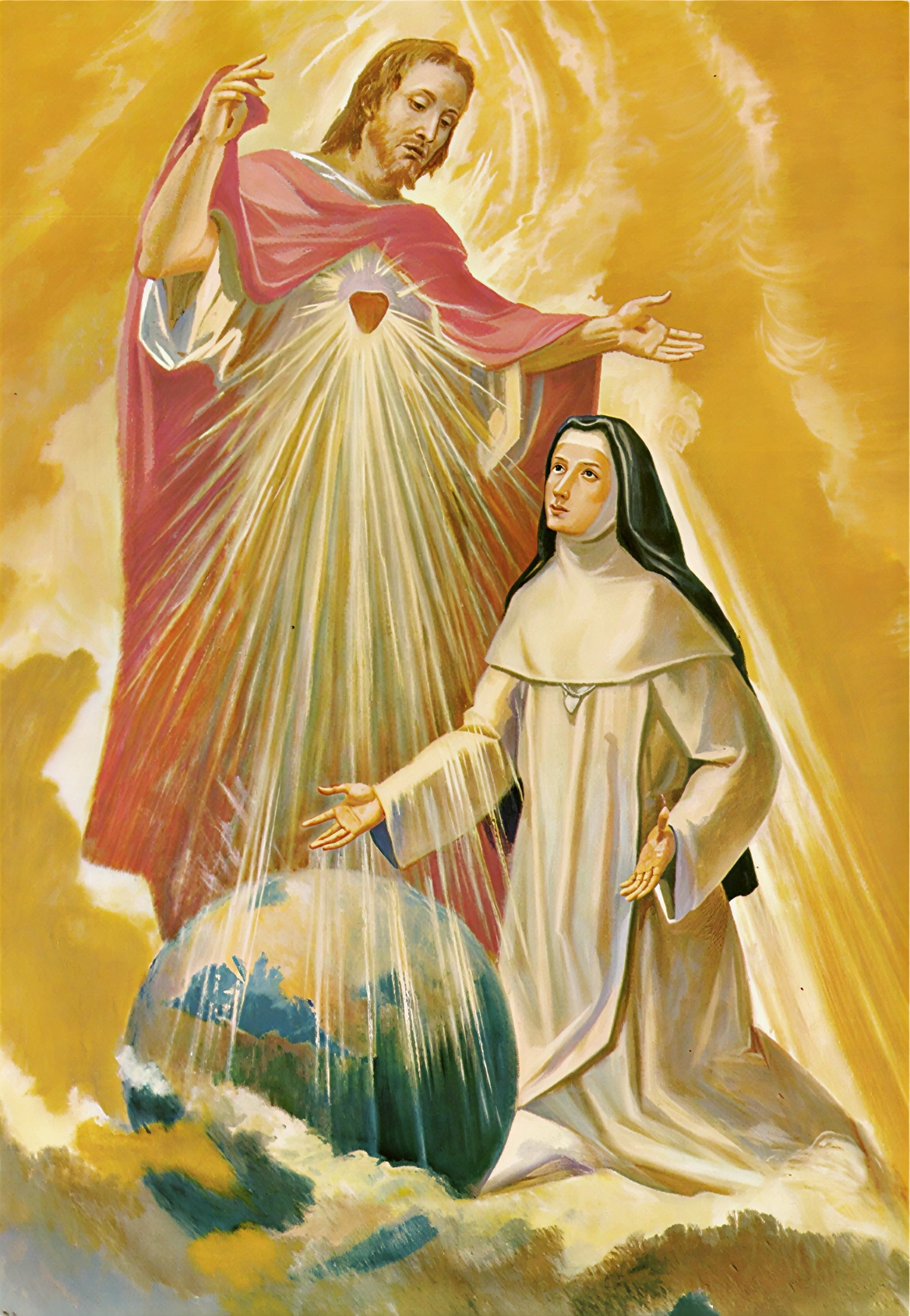
Painting representing the vision received by Mary of the Divine Heart. Jesus revealed to her: "By the brightness of this light, peoples and nations will be illumined, and they will be warmed by its ardour".

In Porto, Mary of the Divine Heart reported several messages from Jesus Christ in which she was asked to contact the Pope to request the consecration of the world to the Sacred Heart of Jesus.

On 10 June 1898, her confessor at the Good Shepherd monastery wrote to Pope Leo XIII to state that Mary of the Divine Heart had received a message from Christ requesting the Pope to consecrate the entire world to the Sacred Heart. The Pope initially did not believe her and took no action. However, on 6 January 1899, she wrote another letter asking that in addition to the consecration, the first Fridays of the month be observed in honour of the Sacred Heart. In the letter, she also referred to the recent illness of the Pope and stated that Christ had assured her that Pope Leo XIII would live until he had performed the consecration to the Sacred Heart. The theologian Laurent Volken states that this had an emotional impact on Leo XIII, despite the theological issues concerning the consecration of non-Christians.

Pope Leo XIII commissioned an inquiry on the basis of her revelation and Church tradition. In his 1899 encyclical letter Annum sacrum, he decreed that the consecration of the entire human race to the Sacred Heart of Jesus should take place on 11 June 1899. In the encyclical, he referred to the illness about which Vischering had written: "There is one further reason that urges us to realize our design: We do not want it to pass by unnoticed. It is personal in nature but just as important: God the author of all Good has saved us by healing us recently from a dangerous disease."

Pope Leo XIII also composed the Prayer of Consecration to the Sacred Heart and included it in the encyclical. Pope Pius X later decreed for the consecration of the human race, performed by Pope Leo XIII, to be renewed each year.

== Death ==
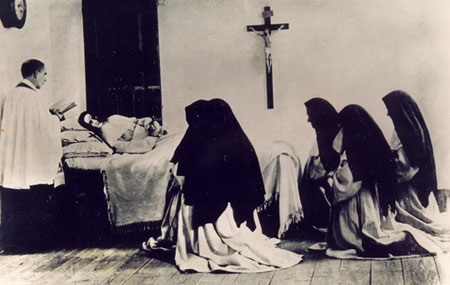
Death of Mary of the Divine Heart in the Convent of the Good Shepherd in Porto, Portugal (1899)

In July 1896, Mary of the Divine Heart was diagnosed with tuberculosis of the spine. She died on Thursday 8 June 1899, the eve of the Solemnity of the Most Sacred Heart of Jesus), three days before the world consecration that Pope Leo XIII had scheduled for the following Sunday.

== Veneration ==
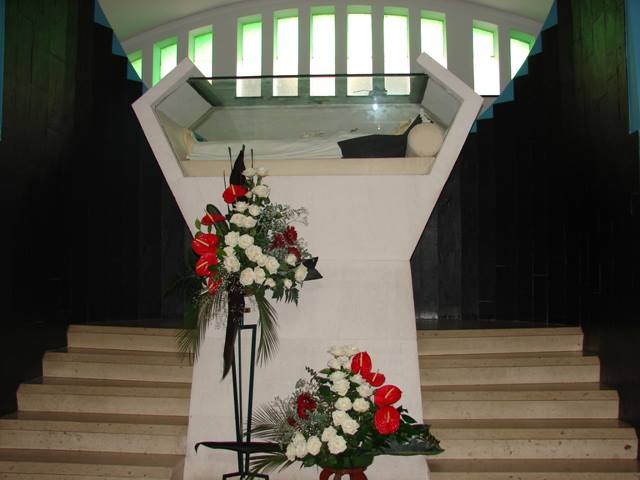
Tomb-reliquary of Mary of the Divine Heart inside the Church of the Sacred Heart of Jesus (Ermesinde)

Vischering's spiritual writings were approved by theologians on 16 July 1941, and her cause was formally opened on 28 November 1941, granting her the title of Servant of God. In 1964, she was declared venerable by the Catholic Church. On 1 November 1975 she was beatified by Pope Paul VI. Waldery Hilgeman is the postulator of the cause of canonisation.

Vischering's incorrupt body is exposed for public veneration in the Church of the Sacred Heart of Jesus, in Ermesinde, in northern Portugal. The church is adjacent to the Convent of the Good Shepherd Sisters. There is also a relic of her body exposed for public veneration at the Sanctuary of Christ the King in Almada, near Lisbon, Portugal.

== Promises of the Sacred Heart of Jesus ==
In his revelations to Mary of the Divine Heart, Jesus is said to have revealed to her two promises:

=== Promise of obtaining graces through the intercession of Mary of the Divine Heart ===
"Know this, My daughter, that by the charity of My Heart I desire to pour out floods of graces through your heart over the hearts of others. This is why people will get close to you with confidence. … No one, even the most hardened sinner, will leave your presence without having received, in one way or another, consolation, relief, or a special grace."

=== Promise of obtaining graces in the Church of the Sacred Heart of Jesus in Ermesinde ===
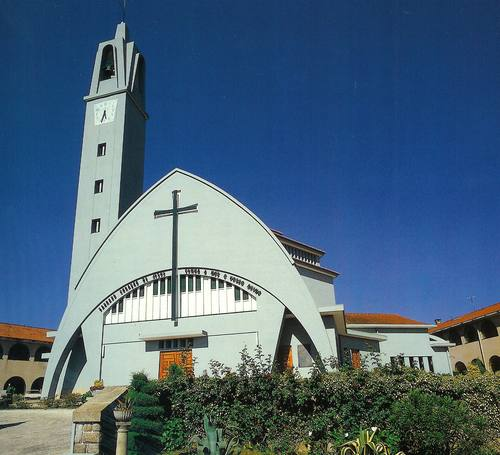
The Church of the Sacred Heart of Jesus in Ermesinde, Portugal

"For a long time, as you know, I have wanted to build a church on the Good Shepherd property. Uncertain as to whom this church should be dedicated, I have prayed and consulted many people without reaching a decision. On the First Friday of this month, I asked Our Lord to enlighten me. After the Holy Communion, He said to me: 'I desire that the church be consecrated to My Heart. You must erect here a place of reparation; from My part I will make it a place of graces. I will distribute copiously graces to all who live in this house [the Convent], those who live here now, those who will live here after, and even to the people of their relations'. Then He told me that He wished this church, above all, to be a place of reparation for sacrileges and to obtain graces for the clergy."

== See also ==
- Act of Reparation to the Sacred Heart of Jesus – also known as First Fridays Devotion
- Alliance of the Hearts of Jesus and Mary
