= Suffert =

Suffert or Süffert is a surname. Notable people with the surname include:

- Ernst Suffert (fl. 1900), German entomologist who specialised in studies of Lepidoptera (butterflies)
- Fritz Süffert (1891–1945), German entomologist who specialised in studies of Lepidoptera (butterflies)
