= Droste zu Vischering =

Westphalian noble family

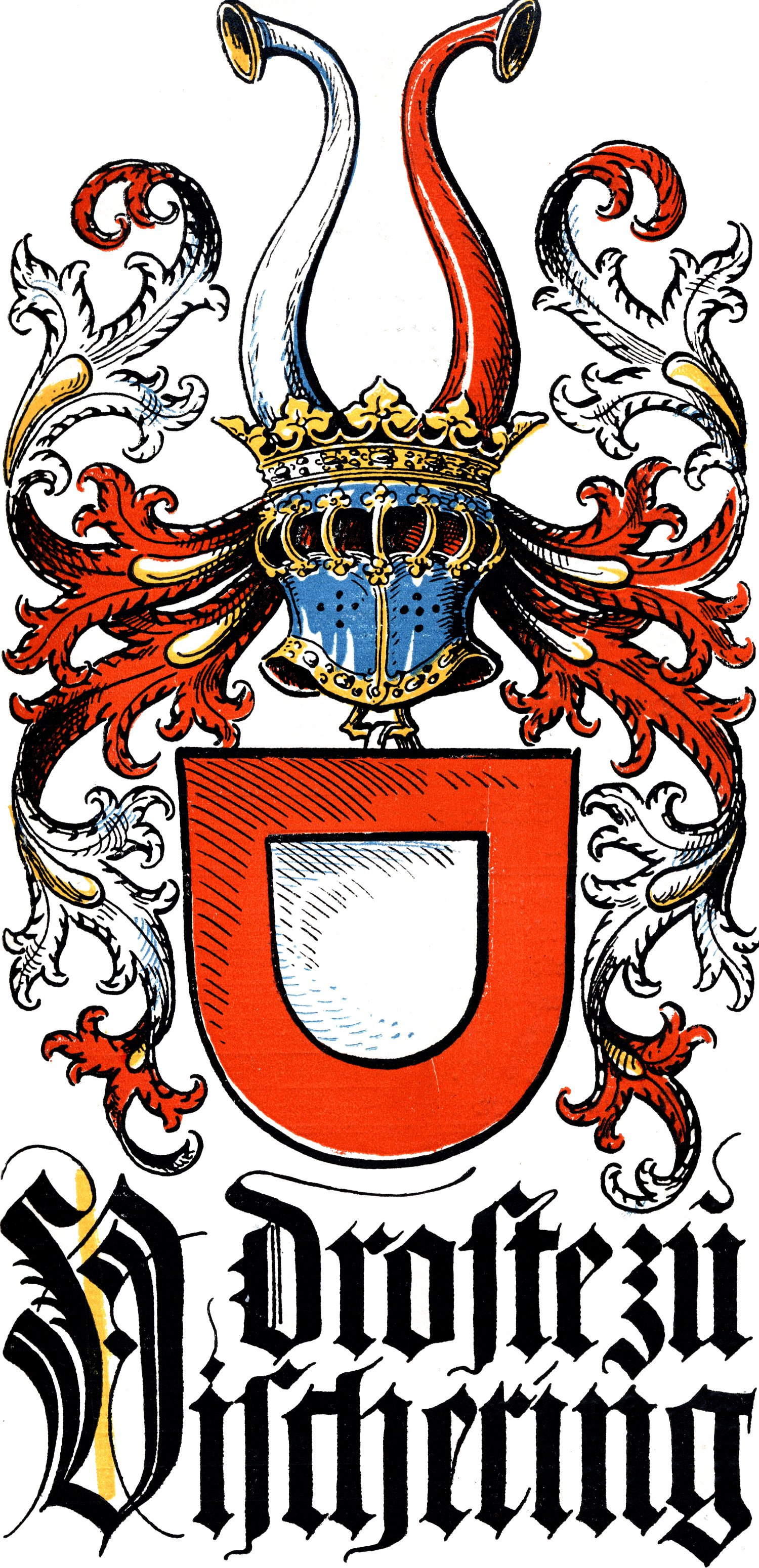
Coat of arms of the Grafen Droste zu Vischering

The Droste zu Vischering is the name of an old and important Westphalian noble family in the Prince-Bishopric of Münster.

== History ==
The family first appeared in written documents from 1070 with Albrecht von Wulfheim, Truchsess of the Prince-Bishops of Münster. After some time, Wulfheim family became owners of Vischering Castle and changed their family name to Droste zu Vischering, due to their hereditary title of Drost (Steward). Because of intermarriage and inheritance with the Senden family, collateral branch of the family was named Droste zu Senden in the 14th century and exists until today.

== Notable family members ==
- Bishop Clemens August Droste zu Vischering (1773–1845), Archbishop of Cologne
- Mary of the Divine Heart (Maria Droste zu Vischering, 1863–1899), Catholic nun
- Gottfried von Droste zu Vischering-Padberg (1908–1992), Physical chemist
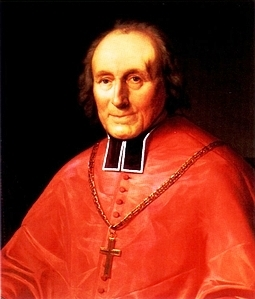
Clemens August Droste zu Vischering

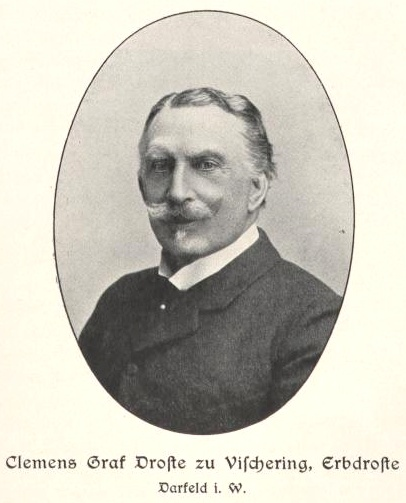
Clemens Heidenreich Droste zu Vischering

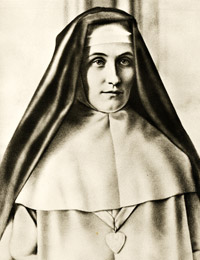
Maria Droste zu Vischering

== See also ==
- Erbdrostenhof in Münster, Westphalia
- Vischering Castle in Lüdinghausen, Münsterland
- Castle of Darfeld in Rosendahl, Münsterland
