= Heinrich Schotten =

Heinrich Georg Leonhard Schotten (13 July 1856, in Marburg – 18 February 1939, in Berlin) was a German mathematician and mathematical pedagogue, known for his work on reforms in the teaching of geometry.

Schotten was a Gymnasium student in Marburg and in Leipzig (St. Nikolai) and studied from 1876 to 1882 in Leipzig, Breslau, Berlin and Marburg with teaching qualification via state examination in Marburg in 1882 and with doctorate in 1883. His dissertation has the title Über einige bemerkenswerte Gattungen der Hypocycloiden. After completing his doctorate, he spent a probationary year in Kassel as a Gymnasium teacher. He was employed as a Gymnasium teacher in Bad Hersfeld, Schmalkalden and Kassel (Königliches Friedrichs-Gymnasium). In 1896 he became rector of the Oberrealschule in Halle. On his initiative a new building was completed in 1908. In 1921 he retired. In 1938, because of illness, Schotten as a widower went to live with his children in Berlin.

He was an editor for the Unterrichtsblätter für Mathematik und Naturwissenschaften and was a member of the German National Teaching Commission for Mathematics, which at that time was mainly founded on Felix Klein's initiative as part of an international exchange on methods of teaching mathematics. Schotten was also part of mathematical evening circle of professors from Leipzig and Halle, including Georg Cantor und Felix Hausdorff. Schotten corresponded with Felix Klein.

In 1894 Schotten was elected a member of the Academy of Sciences Leopoldina. In 1904 he was an Invited Speaker of the ICM in Heidelberg.

== Selected publications ==
- Über Fusspunktscurven, Wissenschaftliche Beilage zum Programm des Kgl. Gymnasiums und Realgymnasiums zu Hersfeld, 1887
- Inhalt und Methode des planimetrischen Unterrichts. Eine vergleichende Planimetrie, B. G. Teubner, Leipzig, vol. 1 1890, vol. 2 1893.
  - 2nd edition with revision by Friedrich Reidt: Anleitung zum mathematischen Unterricht an höheren Schulen, Berlin, 2nd edition 1906
- Mathematischer Unterricht, Schulprogramm der Oberrealschule, Halle 1899
- Die „Meraner Vorschläge“ und die neuere mathematische Schulliteratur, Beilage zum Osterprogramm der städtischen Oberrealschule, Halle 1910, pp. 5–24
- Bericht über die 77. Versammlung Deutscher Naturforscher und Ärzte in Meran, Unterrichtsblätter für Mathematik und Naturwissenschaften, Band 12, Heft 2, 1906, pp. 39–41
