= Paul Rosbaud =

Austrian metallurgist (1896–1963)

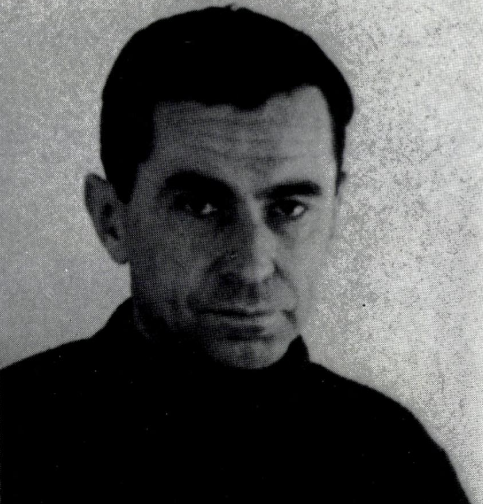
Image of Paul Rosbaud

Paul Rosbaud (18 November 1896 – 28 January 1963), was an Austrian-born metallurgist and scientific adviser for Springer Verlag in Germany before and during World War II. He continued in science publishing after the war with Pergamon Press in Oxford, England. In 1986 Arnold Kramish revealed the undercover work of Rosbaud for the British during the war in the book The Griffin. The Greatest Untold Espionage Story of World War II. It was Rosbaud who dispelled anxiety over a "German atom bomb".

== Education ==
Paul Rosbaud was born in Graz, Austria. He was an illegitimate child. His mother taught the piano, and Paul's brother Hans Rosbaud became a famous conductor. Rosbaud served in the Austrian army during World War I from 1915 to 1918. After the war ended his unit was taken prisoner of war by British forces; this experience gave him a liking for the British. He studied chemistry at Technische Hochschule Darmstadt beginning in 1920. He continued his studies at Kaiser Wilhelm Institut in Berlin. For his doctorate, Rosbaud studied metallurgy with Erich Schmid at Technische Hochschule Berlin-Charlottenburg, and in 1925 Rosbaud and Schmid wrote "Über Verfestigung von Einkristallen durch Legierung und Kaltreekung" (translated title: "On strain hardening of crystals by alloying and cold stretching"), a frequently cited article. Rosbaud then became a "roving scientific talent scout" for the scientific periodical Metallwirtschaft. In 1932 he began to work for publishing house Springer Verlag.

== Spy for Great Britain ==
Through his work at Springer Verlag, Rosbaud knew much of the scientific community in Germany, and as a presumed Nazi, he had sources of vital intelligence relating to weaponry. In 1935 he began to work for the journal Naturwissenschaften. In 1938, he and his Jewish wife Hilde, and their only daughter Angela, went to the UK to avoid Nazi harassment. Rosbaud was invited to stay in the UK, but he decided to keep working in Germany to undermine the Nazi regime. In addition to his own family, Rosbaud helped a number of other Jewish families flee the Nazis, including that of the well known physicist Lise Meitner. He was assisted in his work saving Jews by the fact that he was being run as a British agent by Frank Foley, the MI6 station chief in Berlin.

Eric Welsh and presumably also Foley were Rosbaud's contacts in SIS/MI6.

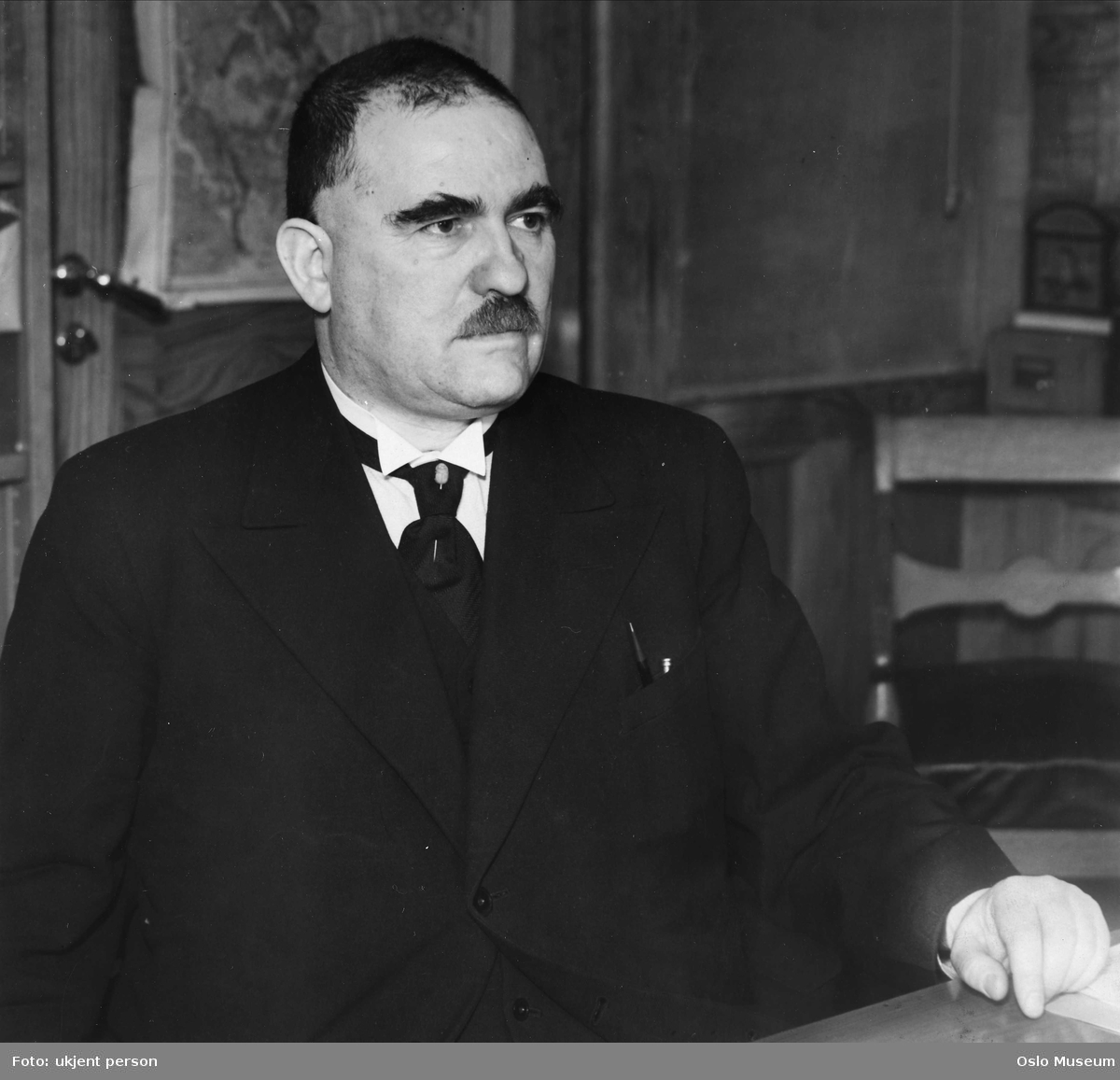
Professor Victor Goldschmidt, the founder of modern geochemistry, was one of Rosbaud's contacts in Oslo. Goldschmidt was of Jewish and Bohemian background and in 1942 narrowly escaped deportation to Auschwitz.

In January 1939, Rosbaud managed to convince Fritz Süffert, editor of the German science journal Naturwissenschaften, to rush into print Otto Hahn's work on nuclear fission. Rosbaud realized the vast destructive potential of what Hahn, Strassmann and Meitner had discovered, and he was acutely aware that the fundamental research had been done in Germany. He wanted the rest of the world to be aware of the significance of the work at least as soon as the Nazi planners did. By rushing Hahn's manuscript into print he was able to alert the physics community worldwide.

Rosbaud was in Oslo from August 26 to September 16, 1939, a few days before Frank Foley abandoned Berlin and transferred to Oslo. There Rosbaud visited Victor Goldschmidt, a geologist who studied the properties of uranium and "super-uranium" (plutonium). In Oslo Rosbaud also met Odd Hassel, an old acquaintance. Goldschmidt and Rosbaud were friends and when the persecution of Jews in Germany intensified in 1935, Rosbaud helped Goldschmidt flee Göttingen and return to Oslo. In late autumn 1939 Rosbaud again visited Oslo and urged Hassel to warn Norwegian authorities about a likely German invasion of Norway.

During the German occupation of Norway, Rosbaud visited Oslo in German uniform and met Professor Tom Barth, who had connections with the resistance movement.

Among the reports Rosbaud supplied to the British was that Germany was producing V2 rockets, and that the German project to develop a nuclear bomb was not successful. Rosbaud has also been connected to the "Oslo report", a detailed list of new German weapons systems, but this seems to have been the work of Hans Ferdinand Mayer, technical director at Siemens.

Many of his intelligence reports were smuggled out of Germany by couriers working for the Norwegian intelligence organisation XU. Norwegians who were studying at technical schools in Germany, such as Sverre Bergh, linked up with Rosbaud and transported the intelligence to occupied Norway, and from there it was sent to neutral Sweden. One daring route involved a flight from Berlin to Oslo, with airport mechanics at each end helping to hide microfilms on the plane.

Rosbaud supplied Moe Berg and Horace Calvert with a list of scientists in the Russian sector of Berlin when scientists were sought to join the victors after the war.

== Pergamon Press co-founder and editor ==
After the war, Rosbaud took up residence in England. He worked for Butterworth-Springer, an Anglo-German publishing company set up in response to a Scientific Advisory Board that included Alfred Egerton, Charles Galton Darwin, Edward Salisbury, and Alexander Fleming. When the Butterworth Company decided to pull out of the English/German liaison, Robert Maxwell acquired 75% while 25% rested with Rosbaud. The company name was changed to Pergamon Press; the partners, with their considerable language skills, cooperated to establish new academic journals until 1956. After a disagreement, Rosbaud left. Maxwell said Rosbaud "was an outstanding editor of the European type from whom I learned some of the trade in the early days".

In 1961 the American Institute of Physics presented Paul Rosbaud with the first John Torrence Tate Medal, an "award for service to the profession of physics rather than research accomplishment".

== See also ==
- Harteck Process
- Karl Koecher

== Notes and references ==
- Michael Smith (1999) "Foley: The Spy Who Saved 10,000 Jews", Hodder & Stoughton. Now republished by Politicos ISBN 1-84275-088-7
