= Church of the Sacred Heart of Jesus (Ermesinde) =

- Church of the Good Shepherd
- Igreja do Sagrado Coração de Jesus
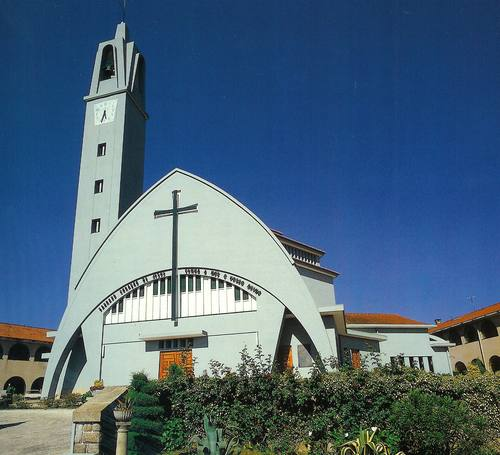
- A view of the front facade of the church of the Sacred Heart of Jesus
- Church of the Sacred Heart of Jesus
- 41°12′28.2″N 8°33′10.7″W
- Location: Porto, Grande Porto, Norte
- Country: Portugal
- Denomination: Roman Catholic

Architecture
- Style: Modern
- Years built: 20th Century

Administration
- Diocese: Diocese of Porto

The Church of the Sacred Heart of Jesus (Portuguese: Igreja do Sagrado Coração de Jesus) is a Modernist church in the civil parish of Ermesinde, in the municipality of Valongo, in the Portuguese district of Porto. The religious temple actually goes by several names, including the Church of the Good Shepherd or Sanctuary of the Sacred Heart of Jesus, a Catholic shrine dedicated to the worship of the Sacred Heart of Jesus.

== History ==
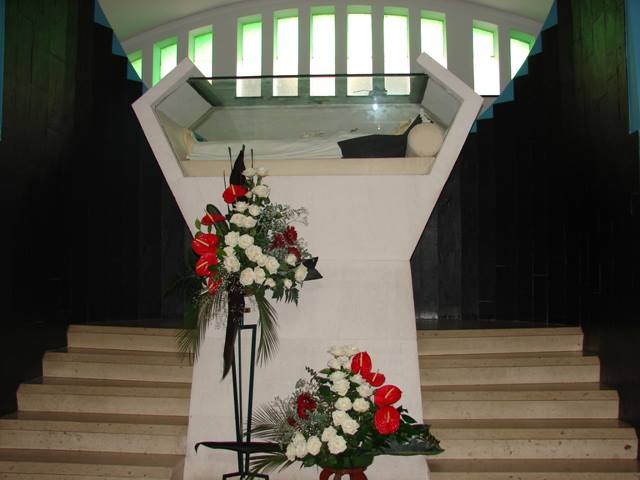
Tomb-reliquary of Sister Mary of the Divine Heart inside the Church of the Sacred Heart of Jesus (Ermesinde)

The church was built between 14 July 1957 and 21 April 1966, and consecrated in fulfillment of a vow made by Sister Mary of the Divine Heart, the Countess Droste zu Vischering, a religious personality known for influencing Pope Leo XIII to make a consecration of the world to the Sacred Heart of Jesus.

Later, in 1964, this Catholic nun of the Congregation of Our Lady of Charity of the Good Shepherd and Mother Superior of the Convent of the Good Shepherd of Porto was proclaimed Venerable by the Catholic Church and was later beatified on 1 November 1975, by Pope Paul VI.

According to the writings of Sister Mary of the Divine Heart, Jesus had revealed to her a promise in relation to the church-shrine:

For a long time, as you know, I have wanted to build a church on the Good Shepherd property. Uncertain as to whom this church should be dedicated, I have prayed and consulted many people without reaching a decision. On the First Friday of this month, I asked Our Lord to enlighten me. After the Holy Communion, He said to me: "I desire that the church be consecrated to My Heart. You must erect here a place of reparation; from My part I will make it a place of graces. I will distribute copiously graces to all who live in this house [the Convent], those who live here now, those who will live here after, and even to the people of their relations." Then He told me that He wished this church, above all, to be a place of reparation for sacrileges and for obtain graces for the clergy.

This church-shrine has become an important place for Christian pilgrims seeking to deepen their devotion to the Sacred Heart of Jesus through the life, virtues and work of Sister Mary of the Divine Heart.

== Architecture ==
Inside this Catholic shrine, there is the tomb-reliquary with the remains of Sister Mary of the Divine Heart exposed to public veneration.

== See also ==
- List of Christian pilgrimage sites
