= Arnold Berliner =

German physicist

Arnold Berliner (Gut Mittelneuland bei Neisse, 26 December 1862 – Berlin, 22 March 1942) was a German physicist.

== Biography ==
Berliner graduated in physics from the University of Breslau in 1886. He worked in the research and development laboratories of the Allgemeine Elektricitäts-Gesellschaft (AEG).

Around the middle of 1912 he was appointed by the publishing firm Springer Verlag, Berlin as editor of the new scientific magazine Naturwissenschaften, inspired by the prestigious British scientific journal Nature, first published in November 1869. Naturwissenschaften began publication in January 1913. He became a good friend of immunologist Paul Ehrlich and chemist Richard Willstätter.

=== Nazi Germany and suicide ===
Berliner was dismissed on 13 August 1935, from the journal he had founded 22 years earlier because of the racial policies on "non-Aryans" implemented by the Nazi government. The decision was reported in Nature (See Nature 136, 506-506; 28 September 1935), which editorialized:

We much regret to learn that on August 13 Dr. Arnold Berliner was removed from the editorship of Die Naturwissenschaften, obviously in consequence of non-Aryan policy. This well-known scientific weekly, which in its aims and features has much in common with NATURE, was founded twenty-three years ago by Dr. Berliner, who has been the editor ever since and has devoted his whole activities to the journal, which has a high standard and under his guidance has become the recognised organ for expounding to German scientific readers subjects of interest and importance.

Berliner committed suicide the day before an evacuation order (meaning deportation to an extermination camp) became effective.

== Honors ==
In 1933, the main-belt asteroid 1018 Arnolda, discovered at Heidelberg Observatory by Karl Reinmuth, was named after Berliner on the occasion of his 70th birthday.
