= Sverre Bergh =

Norwegian engineer who served as a spy in Nazi Germany during World War II

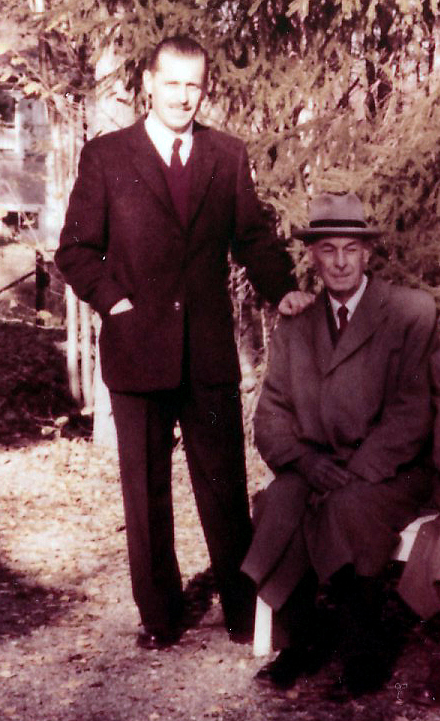
- Sverre Bergh with his father Erik Bergh in Norway 1958
- Born: 1 November 1920; Asker, Norway
- Died: 30 April 2006 (aged 85)

Sverre Bergh (1 November 1920 – 30 April 2006) was a Norwegian engineer who served as a spy in Nazi Germany during World War II.

== Biography ==
Sverre Bergh was born in Asker outside Oslo, Norway. He was the eldest of three sons born to Erik and Anna Bergh. He had spent time in New York City where his father worked as a municipal engineer. In 1940, he went to Dresden, Germany to study at Dresden Technische Hochschule. Before leaving, he was recruited by the Norwegian intelligence group XU. His role was to investigate information given to him by Paul Rosbaud and report this back to XU and the British Secret Intelligence Service, while living under the cover of being a student.

As a student in Dresden, Bergh could travel relatively freely in Nazi Germany and gather intelligence material. Sverre Bergh was an important source of information on the German technological development. Among other things, he was the first to report on the V2 development in Peenemünde and smuggled out plans for Wasserfall ground-to-air missiles. Bergh studied in Dresden until the city was largely destroyed by allied forces. He continued his spy activities until Nazi capitulation in 1945. He revealed the development of the V2 rocket program and delivered reports about the German nuclear weapon project.

After the war, Sverre Bergh moved to the United States, where he enrolled at Northwestern University. He married Martha Bugg in 1947. He worked in several other countries and became an American citizen in 1951. In the interest of national security, the existence of XU was not revealed to the general public by the Norwegian Government until around 1988. At that time the Norwegian government decided to decorate some of the XU members. With help from Norwegian author Svein Sæter, Sverre Bergh told his story in the book Spion i Hitlers Rike, which was published shortly after his death in 2006.

Sverre Bergh's last months in Germany in 1945. Surviving Dresden and escape from Berlin April 20th. (copy from Norwegian Wikipedia)

In early February 1945, Bergh was on his way to Berlin, but on 7 February he was stuck in Copenhagen because the railway line to Berlin was closed. In order to make it to an important meeting with Rosbaud in Berlin on 9 February, he bluffed the Luftwaffe that he was the courier for a package of important medical material from the Serum Institute in Copenhagen to Berlin. The package consisted of regular salt that was well wrapped and stamped. This is how he arrived with the daily courier plane to Tempelhof. Rosbaud reported that there was no progress in the German nuclear program. At the police station in Dresden, Bergh received a tip that the Gestapo was interested in his papers. On Tuesday 13 February, he had invited his girlfriend Gaby to a good restaurant. At half-past ten the air-raid alarm went off, but few people cared about the air-raid alarm because Dresden had no military-strategic importance. During his four years in the city, Bergh had not been able to report on current bomb targets. Bergh and Gaby went to the basement of an apartment building, but Bergh did not dare to use the intended shelter, which he believed would not withstand the weight of a collapsed apartment building. Instead, they sought refuge in a corridor with a vaulted brick ceiling. Hardly anyone else survived in the tenement. Dresden burned intensely after the bombing and the heat created such a strong draft that people and cars were dragged into the flames. Most died from lack of oxygen, but Bergh also saw people killed by the air pressure from air mines (blockbusters) - they were often naked because the air pressure had torn off their clothes. Bergh saw people reduced to coal and ash by the intense heat. After the bombing, Bergh and Gaby walked many hours to get away. The stream of fleeing residents Bergh was among was attacked on 14 February by Allied planes with machine guns. Bergh took cover in the road ditch and his shoes were soaked by all the blood that flowed into the ditch. Bergh believed that the bombing of Dresden was a disgrace.

In March 1945, he obtained documents showing that he worked for the Red Cross, which ran evacuations with the White Buses. Bergh also received other documents which showed that he worked for the Swedish authorities, and that he was allowed to have his own car and buy petrol. In this way he was able to travel around Schleswig-Holstein and around Hamburg and report on German force movements. After the last visit to Rosbaud in Berlin on 20 April, he made the journey north as far as possible from Soviet forces advancing from the east. Part of the drive from Berlin to Hamburg was in no man's land where German and Soviet forces fired at each other over him. In Hamburg he bought a small car and drove north until he met British forces, which he joined. Together they drove to Flensburg and were there when the last remnants of German central administration headed by Dönitz moved there after Berlin fell on 2 May. At this time there were both German and British military in Flensburg. The German forces in Denmark capitulated on 4 May and Bergh was the first of the Allies to drive across the border to a free Denmark. In Denmark, he got Danish plates on his car and got British documents.[4] From Copenhagen he was sent to London and debriefed with Eric Welsh from the British side and Alfred Roscher Lund from the Norwegian side. According to Rosher Lund, Bergh was the first to report on the development of rocket weapons in Peenemünde. In London, Bergh wrote a report on his four years as an XU agent in Germany, the report was on one typed sheet.

== See also ==
- Bombing of Dresden in World War II

== Other sources ==
- Bergh, Sverre; Svein Sæter (2006) Spion i Hitlers Rike (Cappelen Damm) ISBN 978-82-04-12361-9
- Sæter, Einar; Svein Sæter (2007) XU. I hemmeleg teneste 1940-1945 (Samlaget) ISBN 9788252145359
