= Rosendahl =

- Municipality
- Flag Coat of arms

- Location of Rosendahl within Coesfeld district
- Interactive map of Rosendahl
- Location within Germany Location within North Rhine-Westphalia
- Coordinates: 52°01′02″N 7°12′38″E
- Country: Germany
- State: North Rhine-Westphalia
- Admin. region: Münster
- District: Coesfeld
- Subdivisions: 3

Government
  - Mayor (2020–25): Christoph Gottheil

Area
  - Total: 94.49 km^{2} (36.48 sq mi)
- Elevation: 95 m (312 ft)

Population (2025-12-31)
  - Total: 11,137
  - Density: 117.9/km^{2} (305.3/sq mi)
- Time zone: UTC+01:00 (CET)
  - Summer (DST): UTC+02:00 (CEST)
- Postal codes: 48720
- Dialling codes: 02547 / 02545 / 02566
- Vehicle registration: COE
- Website: www.rosendahl.de

Rosendahl (German pronunciation: [ˈʁoːzn̩ˌdaːl]) is a municipality in the district of Coesfeld in the state of North Rhine-Westphalia, Germany. It is located approximately 10 kilometres (6.2 mi) north-west of Coesfeld.

In this municipality is located the Castle of Darfeld, internationally famous for having been the residence of Mary of the Divine Heart (1863–1899), the Countess Droste zu Vischering who became Sister of the Good Shepherd and received several revelations from God. She is best known for influencing Pope Leo XIII to consecrate the world to the Sacred Heart of Jesus.

== Population ==
Historical population

Year	Pop.	±% p.a.
1965	8,259	—
1970	8,569	+0.74%
1975	8,859	+0.67%
1980	8,984	+0.28%
1985	9,021	+0.08%
1990	9,693	+1.45%
1995	10,392	+1.40%

Year	Pop.	±% p.a.
2000	10,951	+1.05%
2005	10,991	+0.07%
2010	10,905	−0.16%
2015	10,712	−0.36%
2020	10,810	+0.18%
2025	11,137	+0.60%

Source: Landesdatabank Nordrhein-Westfalen

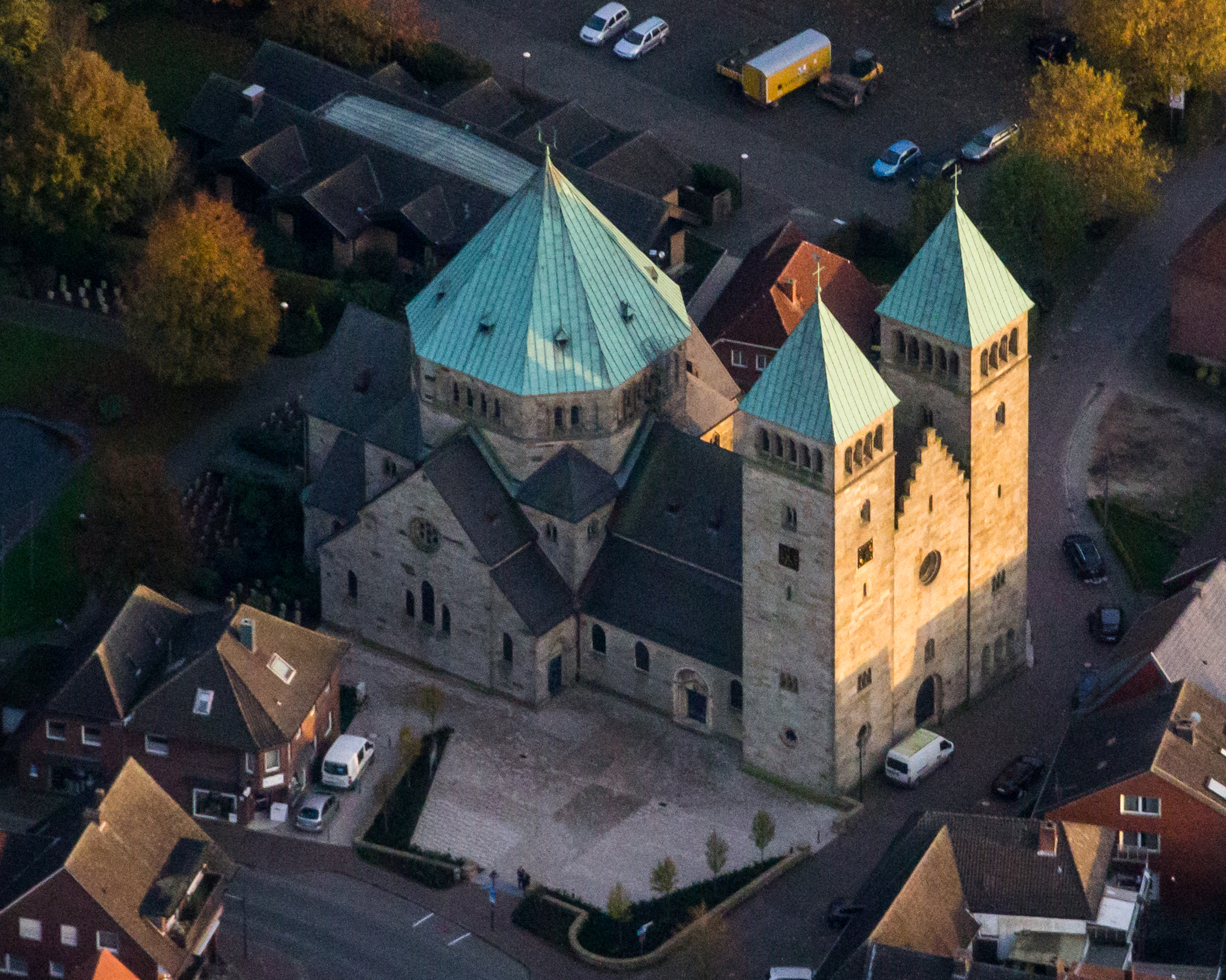
Church of St. Fabian and Sebastian (Osterwick)

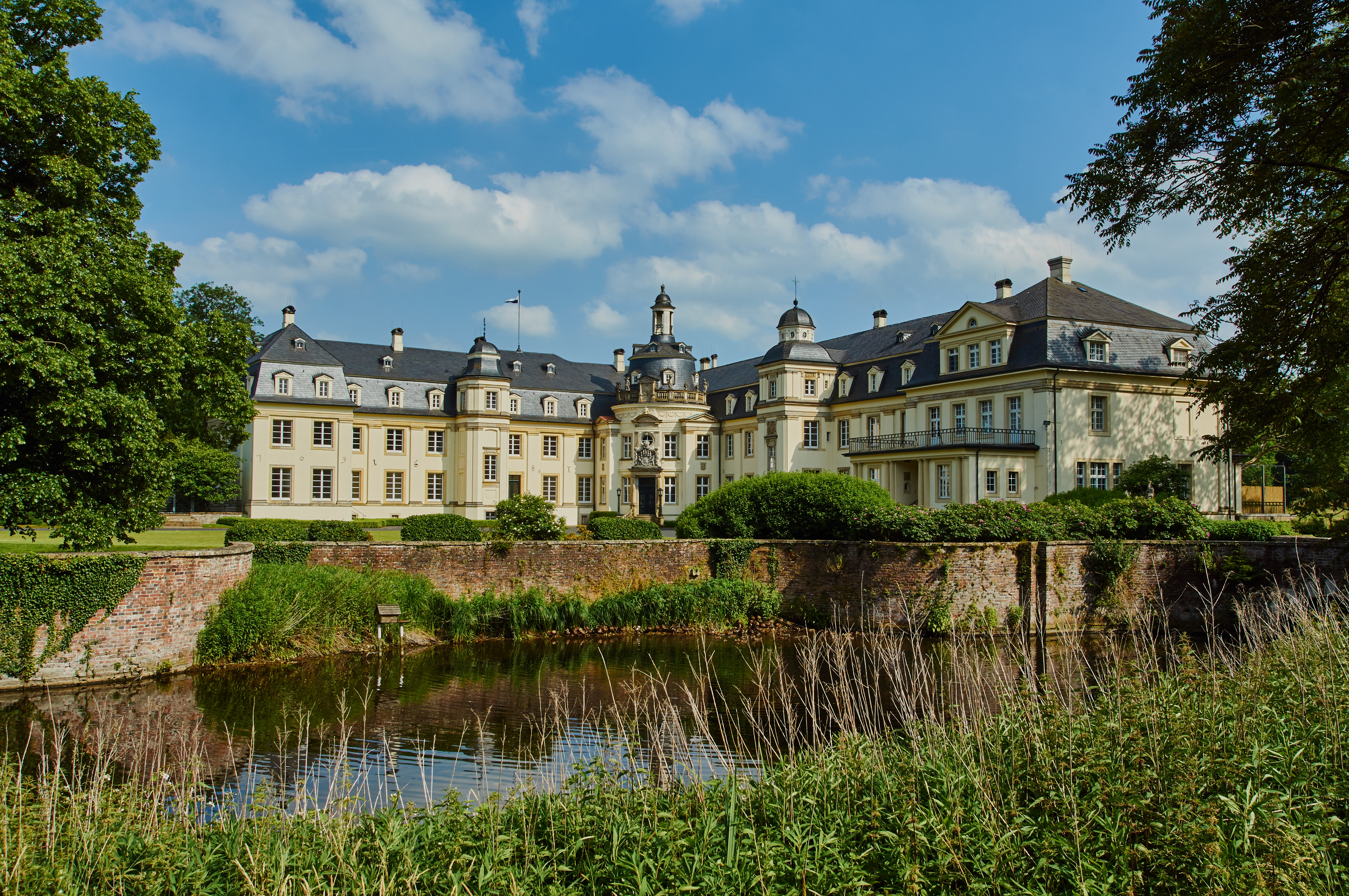
Palace Varlar

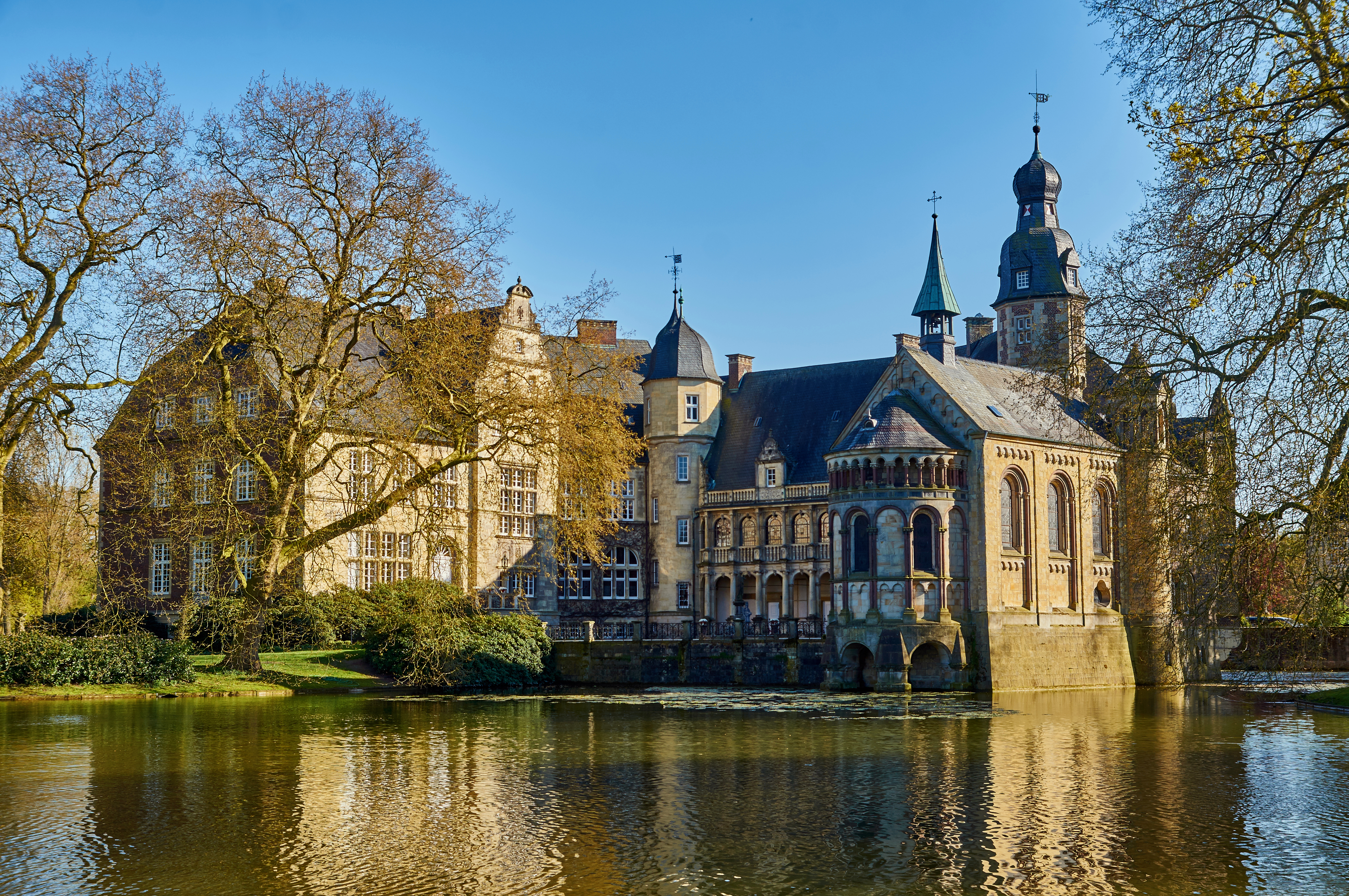
Castle of Darfeld
