= Doorman =

A doorman, also known as doorkeeper, is someone who is posted at, and often guards, a door, or by extension another entrance (specific similar terms exist, e.g. gatekeeper, hall porter). Specific uses include:

== Professions ==
- Doorman (profession), hired to provide courtesy and security services at a residential building or hotel
- Bouncer, a person employed by a nightclub or similar establishment to prevent troublemakers from entering or to eject them from the premises
- Usher (occupation), often ceremonial
- Ostiarius, ecclesiastical minor order
- Doorkeeper (Houses of Parliament), badged officer of the United Kingdom Houses of Parliament
- Doorkeeper of the United States House of Representatives

== Books ==
- The Doorman (El Portero), a novel by Reinaldo Arenas
- Doorman (character), a Marvel Comics superhero

== Film and television ==
- The Doorman (1950 film), a 1950 film starring Cantinflas
- The Doorman, a 2005 film starring Dominique Vandenberg
- The Doorman, a 2007 film directed by Peter Bogdanovich
- The Doorman (2020 film), a 2020 action thriller starring Ruby Rose and Jean Reno
- Dead as a Doorman, a 1986 film starring Bradley Whitford
- "The Doorman" (Seinfeld), an episode of Seinfeld
- "Doorman" (Wonder Man), an episode of Wonder Man

== Music ==
- "Doorman" (song), by British rapper Slowthai and featuring Mura Masa from his 2019 album Nothing Great About Britain
- "Doorman", a rock song by Stereophonics from the 2005 album Language. Sex. Violence. Other?

== Other uses ==
- Karel Doorman (1889-1942), Dutch Rear Admiral
- SS Doorman, a Second World War Dutch merchant ship
- Doorman, a village in Kunduz Province in Afghanistan
- Uzi Doorman, the main character of the animated series, Murder Drones

== See also ==
- Chancellor, originally posted at a door post
