= Vischering Castle =

Coordinates: 51°46′34″N 7°26′35″E

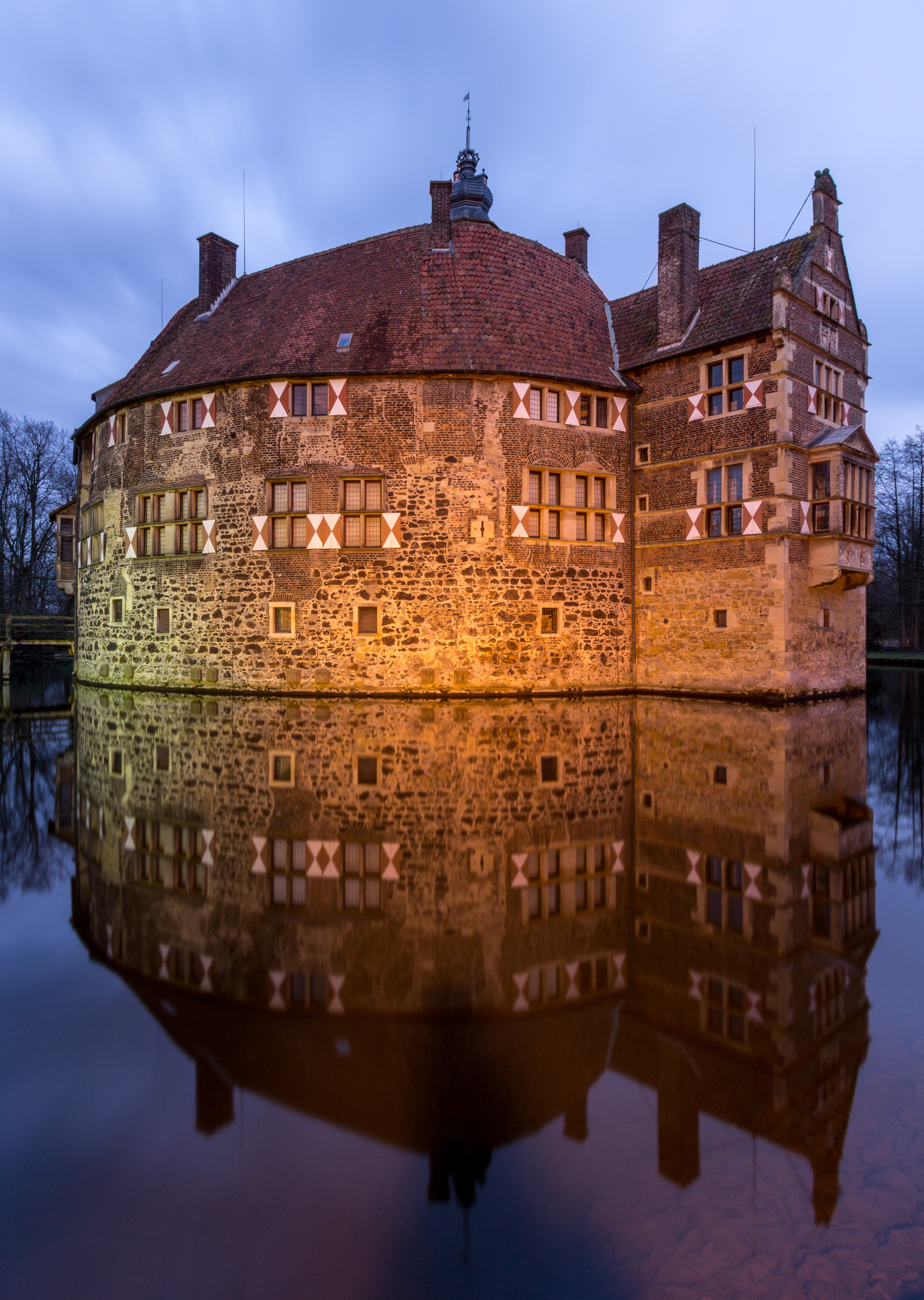
Vischering Castle

Vischering Castle (German: Burg Vischering) in Lüdinghausen, North Rhine-Westphalia is the most typical moated castle in the Münster (region) of Germany. This region has one of the highest German concentrations of castles, palaces and fortifications, Lüdinghausen having three by itself. The castle consists of outer defensive courtyard, defensive gateways, moat, drawbridge, main building and chapel. The sandstone walls, the red tile roofs as well as their reflection in the moat provide many harmonious views from the wooded surroundings.

Vischering Castle was built by Bischop Gerhard von der Mark to counter the second castle built by the Von Lüdinghausen family. It became the seat of the Droste zu Vischering Family. Droste is the local title for the hereditary noble administrators serving the Bishops of Münster. The moat is constantly replenished by a side-arm of the River Stever. The outer defensive courtyard contains the business and farm buildings. The main building is a horseshoe-shaped three-story structure with heavy outer wall. Its inner courtyard is closed off by the chapel and a lower defense wall. A castle keep is missing, having been removed during Renaissance renovations. Fire destroyed the castle in 1521. Rebuilding took place on the existing foundation. Windows and the addition of a large bay made the castle more liveable but diminished its defensive character. The whole site however retains the character of a feudal age moated castle. Damage from air attack during World War II was minor.

Vischering Castle houses the Münsterlandmuseum, an exhibit on knighthood for children, as well as a cafe-restaurant. It serves as a cultural center for Kreis Coesfeld. Visiting hours are provided in the first link below. Viewing the outside is possible at all times. The second link provides a more detailed chronology of the castle in German .
