= Ermesinde =

- Civil parish
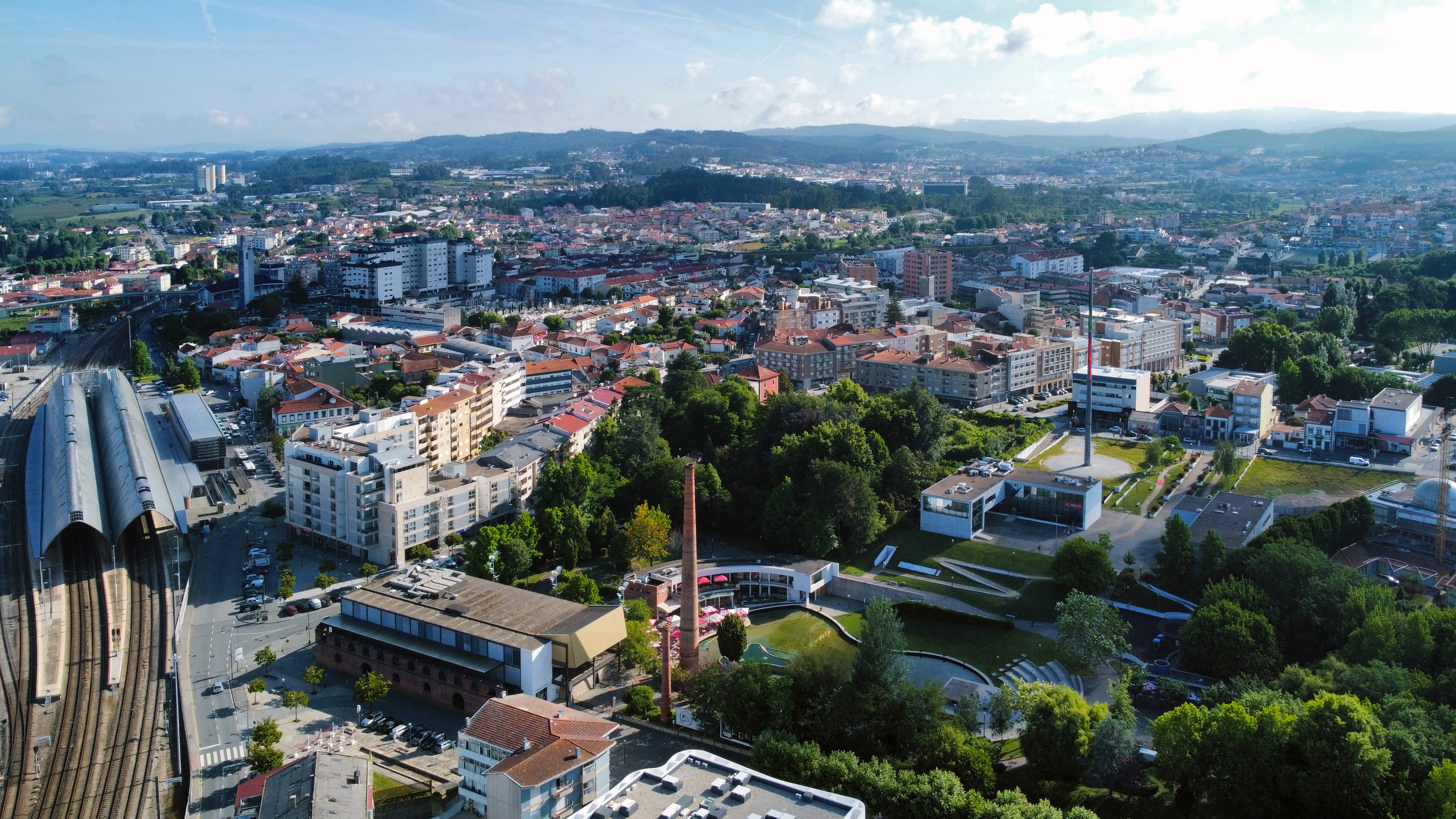

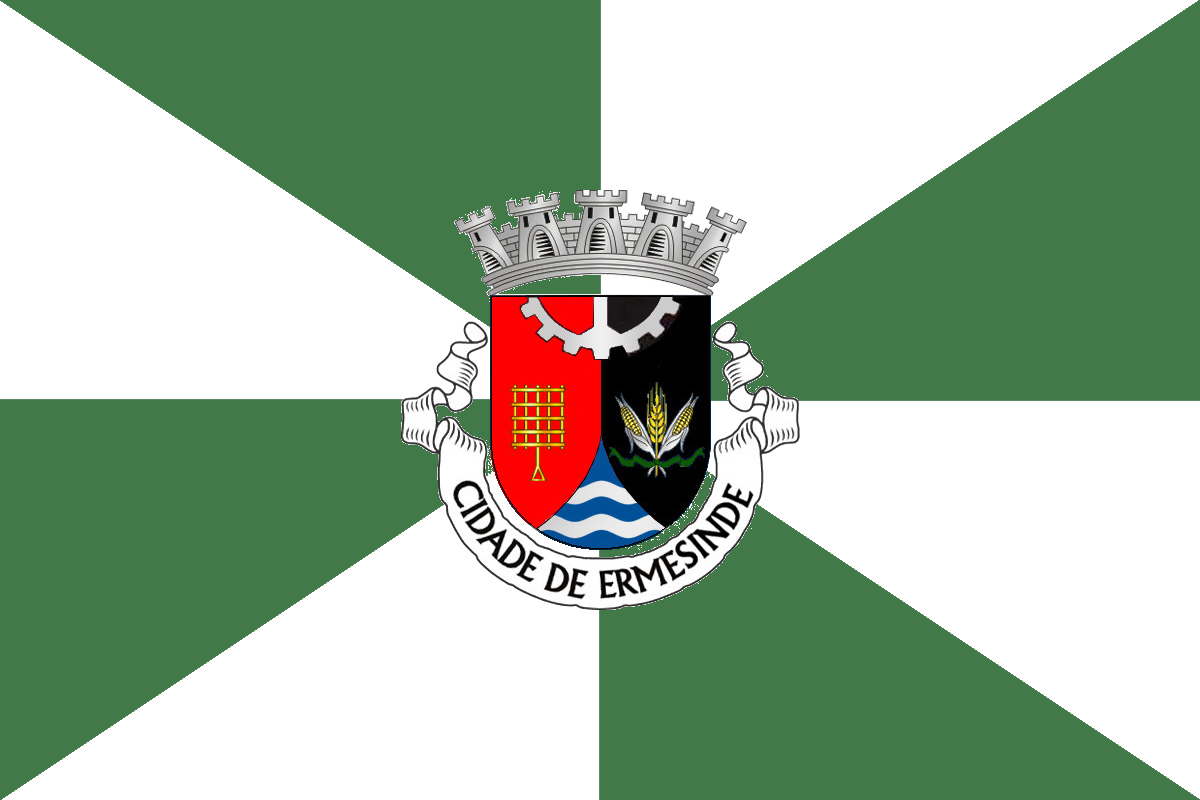
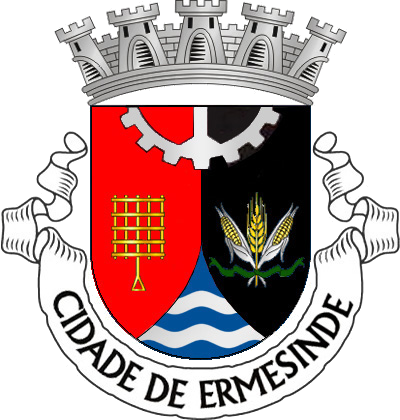
- Flag Coat of arms

- Location in Portugal
- Coordinates: 41.217°N 8.550°W
- Country: Portugal
- Region: Norte
- Metropolitan area: Porto
- District: Porto
- Municipality: Valongo

Area
  - Total: 7.65 km^{2} (2.95 sq mi)

Population (2011)
  - Total: 38,940
  - Density: 5,090/km^{2} (13,200/sq mi)
- Time zone: UTC+00:00 (WET)
  - Summer (DST): UTC+01:00 (WEST)
- Postal code: 4445
- Website: http://www.jf-ermesinde.pt/

Ermesinde is a civil parish in the municipality (concelho) of Valongo, in continental Portugal, 9 kilometres (5.6 mi) northeast of Porto. The population in 2011 was 38940, in an area of 7.65 km^{2}. It is the smallest by area, and the densest by population (approximately 5000 inhabitants per kilometer square).

== History ==
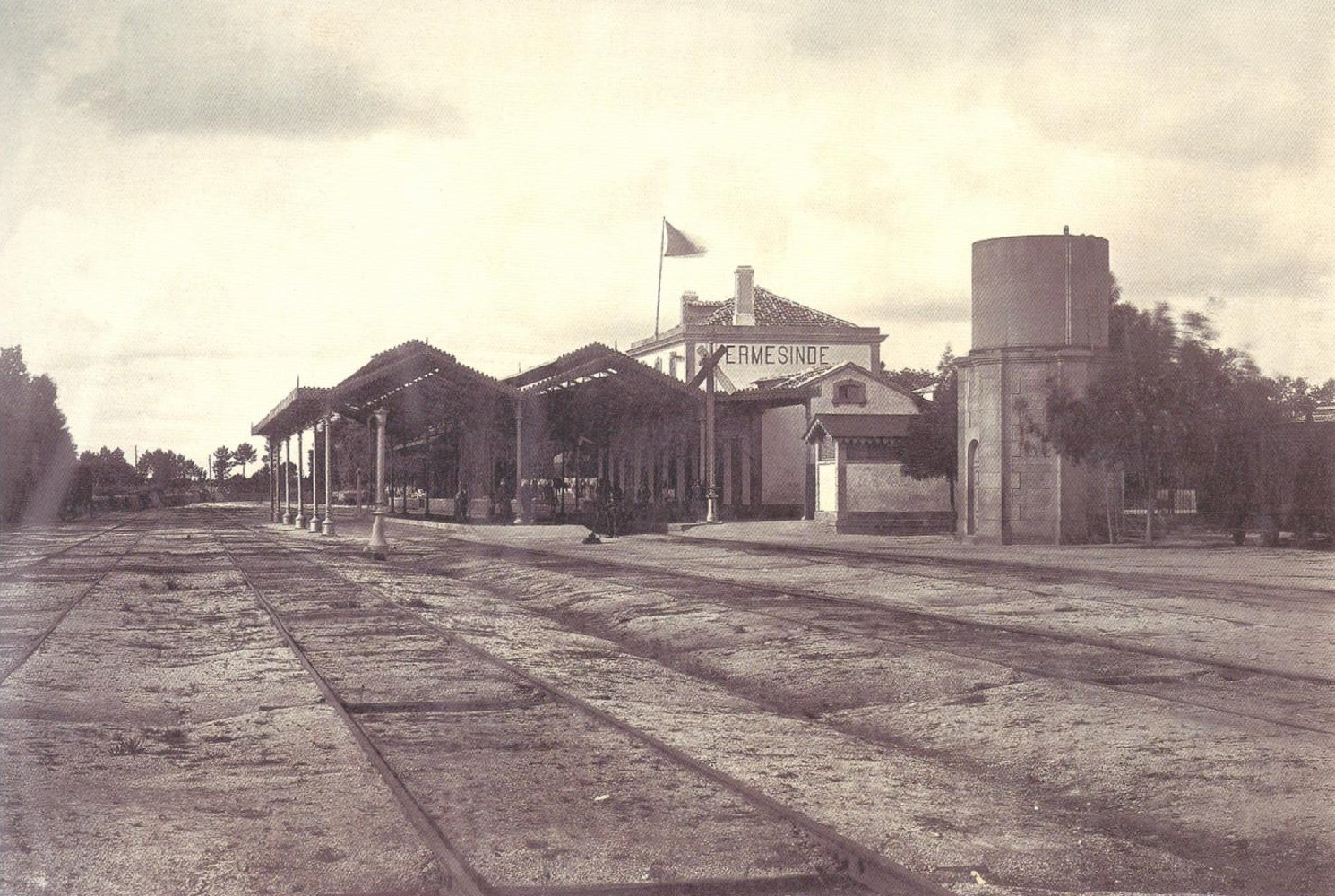
The Ermesinde train station, before the renovation in the 21st century

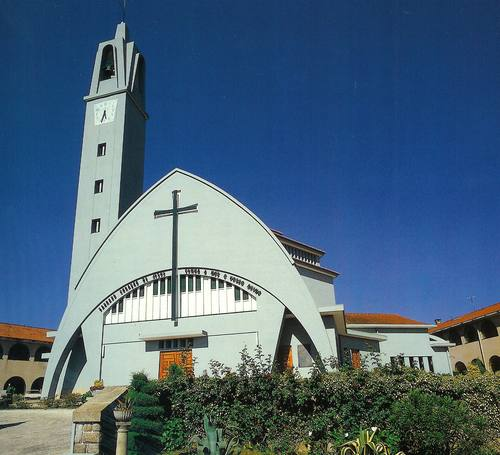
The Church-Sanctuary of the Sacred Heart of Jesus in Ermesinde.

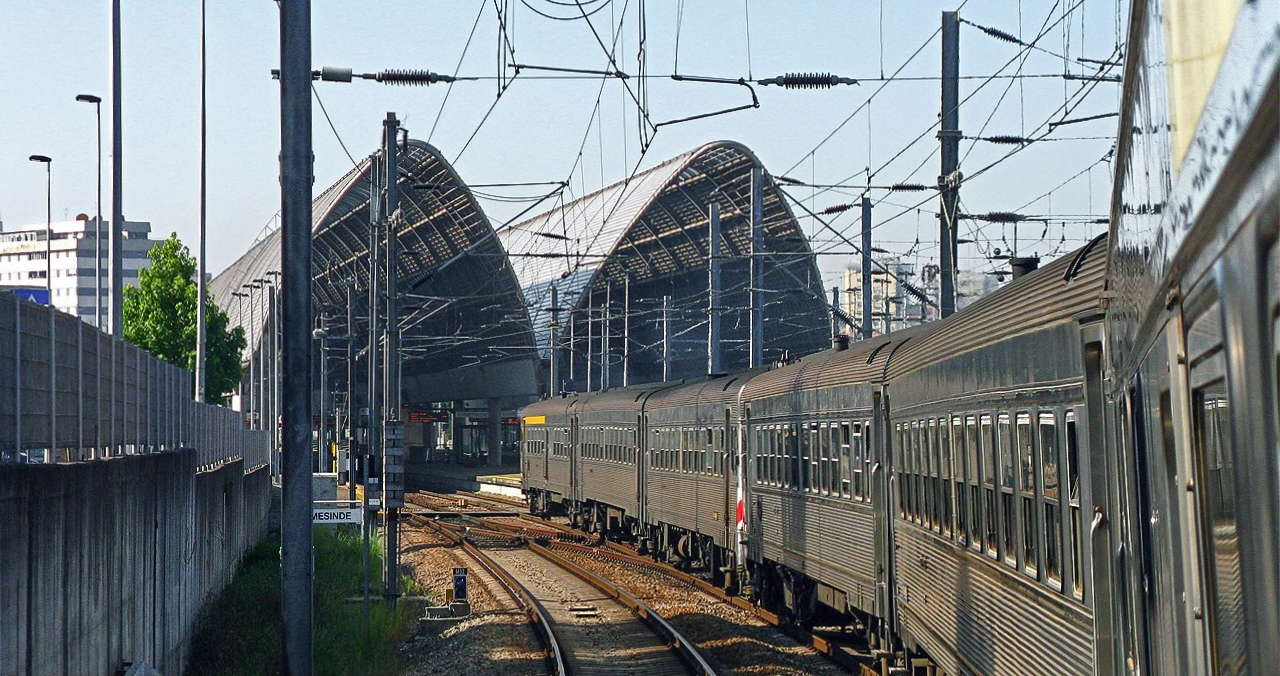
The modern railyard and station of Ermesinde

Initially a riverside community, named São Lourenço de Asmes, it developed as the result of the settlement of railworkers, involved in the construction of the railway. The junction of the two principal rail-lines in northern Portugal, a line coming from Porto and another from the northern districts, occurred in Ermezinde. The station that was constructed in this parish eventually developed and surpassed in the transit of the older São Lourenço de Asmes. Ermesinde became a formal junction of the Portuguese railway network, becoming the start link along the Douro railway line to Pocinho

In 1910, following the 5 October 1910 revolution, the parish officially adopted the new name.

During the 20th century, its proximity to Porto and the importance of the railways, allowed it to develop and become a suburb of Porto. In 1990, the town had evolved, obtaining the status of city, defined by Portuguese law and granted by the national parliament: there have been some interest by residents to obtain municipality. The construction of a new rail station, development of a cultural center and remodeling of the squares under the Polis Programme have been some of the tentative efforts to promote the center's growth.
