= Erbdrostenhof =

Palace in Münster, Germany

Coordinates: 51.9609°N 7.6322°E

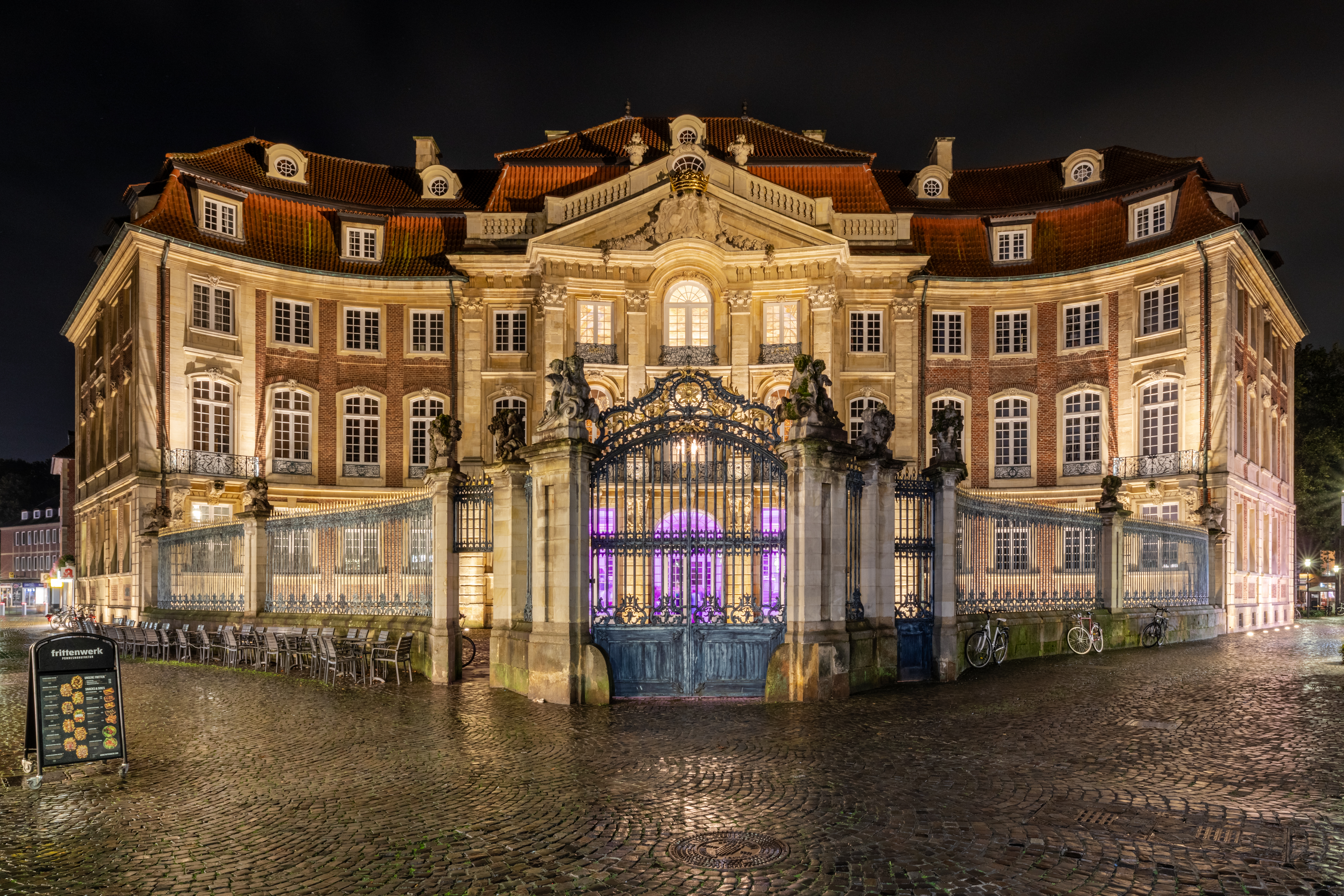
Erbdrostenhof, 2023

The Erbdrostenhof is a three-wing late Baroque palace in Münster, North-Rhine-Westphalia, Germany. It is located on Salzstraße. It was designed by Johann Conrad Schlaun for Adolf Heidenreich Freiherr Droste zu Vischering, Erbdrost of Münster and built between 1753 and 1757. Johann Christoph Manskirch produced sculptures for the building, whilst Nikolaus Loder painted frescoes in the interior - the latter were damaged during World War Two and restored between 1965 and 1967 by the Austrian restorer Paul Reckendorfer.

The building is also notable as the birthplace of Blessed Mary of the Divine Heart.

== Sources ==
- "Erbdrostenhof - Sehenswürdigkeiten in Münster, Nordrhein-Westfalen - beLocal.de".belocal.de. 2013-07-07.
- http://www.erbdrostenhof.de/.
