= Zeitschrift für Physikalische Chemie =

- Discipline: Physical chemistry
- Language: English
- Edited by: Klaus Rademann

Publication details
- History: 1887-present
- Publisher: Oldenbourg Wissenschaftsverlag
- Frequency: Monthly
- Impact factor: 2.408 (2020)

Standard abbreviations
- ISO 4: Z. Phys. Chem.

Indexing
- CODEN: ZPCFAX
- ISSN: 0942-9352 (print); 2196-7156 (web)
- LCCN: 55041977
- OCLC no.: 786468005

Links
- Journal homepage

Zeitschrift für Physikalische Chemie (English: Journal of Physical Chemistry) is a monthly peer-reviewed scientific journal covering physical chemistry that is published by Oldenbourg Wissenschaftsverlag. Its English subtitle is "International Journal of Research in Physical Chemistry and Chemical Physics". It was established in 1887 by Wilhelm Ostwald, Jacobus Henricus van 't Hoff, and Svante August Arrhenius as the first scientific journal for publications specifically in the field of physical chemistry. The editor-in-chief is Klaus Rademann (Humboldt University of Berlin).

== Abstracting and indexing ==
The journal is abstracted and indexed in:

- Astrophysics Data System
- EBSCO databases
- Current Contents/Physical, Chemical and Earth Sciences
- Science Citation Index

According to the Journal Citation Reports, the journal has a 2020 impact factor of 2.408.
