= Fritz Süffert =

German entomologist

Fritz Süffert (1891–1945) was a German entomologist who specialised in studies of butterflies, especially their adaptive colouration. Süffert was editor of the German science journal Naturwissenschaften, and was responsible in January 1939, at the instigation of Paul Rosbaud, for rushing into print Otto Hahn's work on nuclear fission, which alerted the international science community to Germany's progress in nuclear physics. He died on April 24, 1945 during the Battle of Berlin.

== Works ==
- Süffert, F. (1925): Geheime Gesetzmässigkeiten in der Zeichnung der Schmetterlinge Revue suisse de Zoologie 32(10), pp. 107–111
- Süffert, F. (1926): Die Flügelschuppen der Schmetterlinge, ihr Bau und ihre Farben Mikroskopie für Naturfreunde 4(1), pp. 1–9, figs. 1-2; (3) 65-77, pl. 4, figs. 3, 5-7.
- Süffert, F. (1927): Zur vergleichenden Analyse der Schmetterlingszeichnung, "Biol. Zentralbl." 47, 1927, pp. 385–413.
- Süffert, F. (1929): Morphologische Erscheinungsgruppen in der Flügelzeichnung der Schmetterlinge, insbesondere die Querbindenzeichnung - Wilhelm Roux' Archiv für Entwicklungsmechanik der Organismen 120, pp. 299–383, 51 figs.
