= The Science of Nature =

- Discipline: Natural sciences applied to biology
- Language: English
- Edited by: Matthias Waltert

Publication details
- History: 1913–present
- Publisher: Springer Science+Business Media
- Frequency: Monthly
- Open access: Hybrid
- Impact factor: 2.098 (2014)

Standard abbreviations
- ISO 4: Sci. Nat.

Indexing
- CODEN: NATWAY
- ISSN: 0028-1042 (print); 1432-1904 (web)
- LCCN: 14013764
- OCLC no.: 01759509

Links
- Journal homepage; Online access

The Science of Nature, formerly Naturwissenschaften, is a monthly peer-reviewed scientific journal published by Springer Science+Business Media covering all aspects of the natural sciences relating to questions of biological significance. It was founded in 1913 and intended as a German-language equivalent of the English-language journal Nature, at a time when German was still a dominant language of the natural sciences. The journal is now published in English.

== History ==
Die Naturwissenschaften was founded in 1913 by Arnold Berliner and published by Julius Springer Verlag. Berliner intended to create a German equivalent to the English-language journal Nature. The original subtitle Wochenschrift für die Fortschritte der Naturwissenschaften, der Medizin und der Technik (Weekly Publication of the Advances in the Natural Sciences, Medicine and Technology) was later changed to its current The Science of Nature. The journal is published monthly and the articles are exclusively in English, after a gradual transition from German to English during the 1990s. In January 2015, the journal changed its name to The Science of Nature.

=== Editors ===
The following persons have been editor-in-chief of the journal:

- 1913–1935: Arnold Berliner
- 1913: Curt Thesing
- 1914–1921: August Pütter
- 1922–1924: Herrmann Braus
- 1925–1940: Hans Spemann
- 1935–1936: Hans Matthée
- 1936–1944: Fritz Süffert
- 1946–1949: Arnold Eucken
- 1950–1966: Ernst Lamla
- 1967–1986: Hansjochem Autrum
- 1967–1983: Friedrich L. Boschke
- 1987–2000: Dieter Czeschlik
- 2001–2009: Tatiana Czeschlik
- 2009–2019: Sven Thatje
- 2019–present: Matthias Waltert
