= Our Lady of Pellevoisin =

Series of supernatural apparitions in France

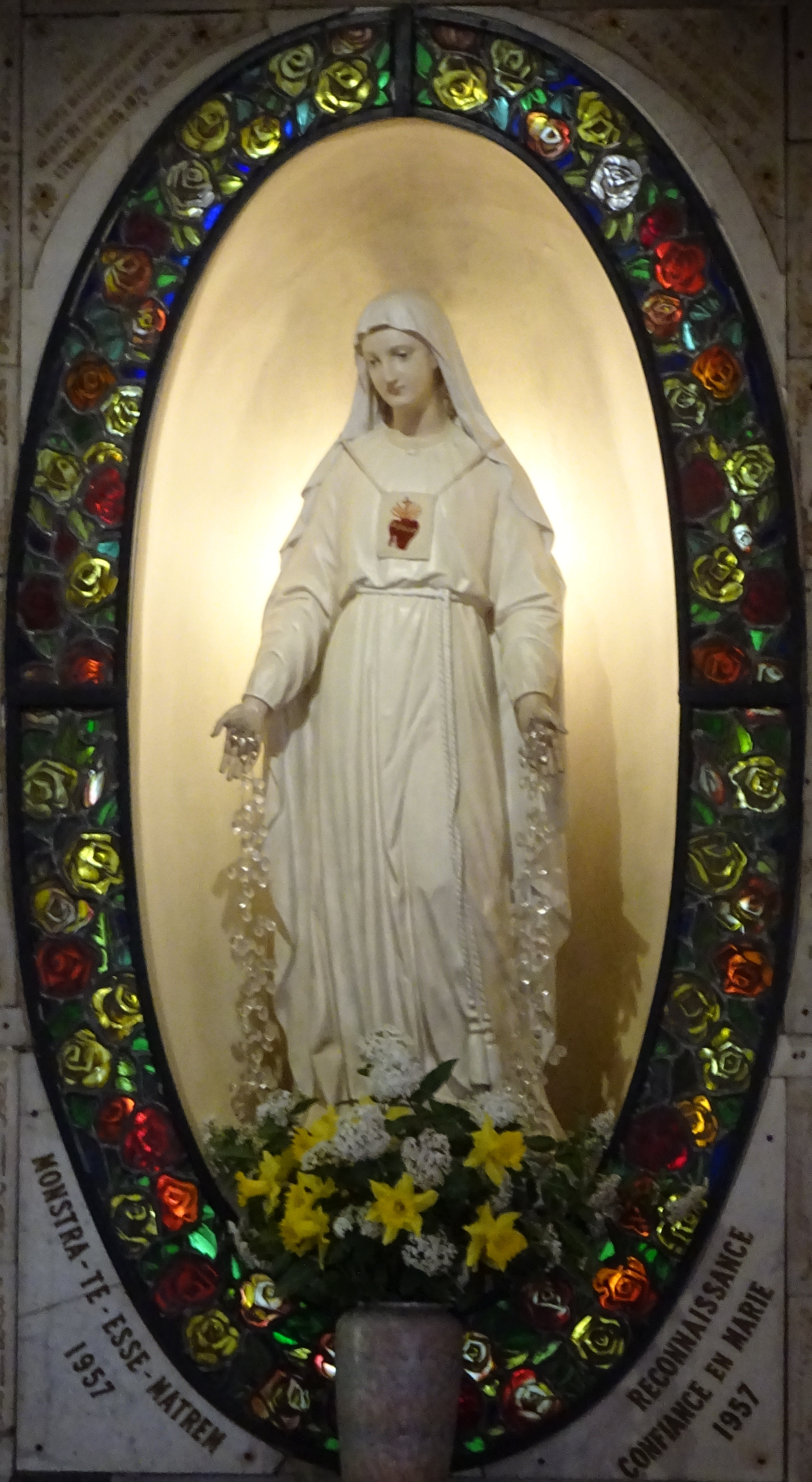
- Notre-Dame de Pellevoisin (Our Lady of Pellevoisin as the All-Merciful Mother)
- Location: Pellevoisin, France
- Date: 14 February to 8 December 1876
- Shrine: Sanctuary of the All-Merciful Mother of Pellevoisin

Our Lady of Pellevoisin (French: Notre-Dame de Pellevoisin) is a title of the Blessed Virgin Mary which refers to a series of Marian apparitions in Pellevoisin, Indre, France. Pellevoisin is west of Châteauroux in the Catholic Archdiocese of Bourges.

In 1876, a domestic servant, Estelle Faguette, reported receiving a series of fifteen apparitions of the Blessed Virgin Mary, and recovered from a serious illness, tuberculosis. A distinctive feature of Faguette's apparitions was her claim that the Virgin wished her devotees to wear a Scapular of the Sacred Heart.

Pellevoisin rapidly became a place of pilgrimage, the shrine of Our Lady of Pellevoisin. Pope Leo XIII encouraged the pilgrimages by approving indulgences to pilgrims, and also approved related devotions to Our Lady.

In 1983, Archbishop Paul Vignancour of Bourges formally declared Faguette's cure to be inexplicable in the light of medical science and that her recovery could rightly be regarded as a miracle by Catholics.

== Estelle Faguette ==
Estelle Faguette was born 12 September 1843 at Saint-Memmie near Châlons-sur-Marne and joined the Children of Mary at the age of 14. She entered an order of Augustinian nursing sisters, but left while still a novice. During her stay, she fell ill several times, which led to her departure. On 15 September 1863, Faguette reluctantly accepted that she could not pursue the life of a nursing sister and returned to her parents' home.

Faguette died in Pellevoisin on 23 August 1929, a few weeks short of her 87th birthday.

== Marian apparitions ==
At the time of the apparitions, Pellevoisin was the commercial centre for around a thousand citizens under the authority of the village mayor, Comte de la Rochefoucauld. His wife, Marie-Luce de La Rochefoucauld-Montbel, employed Estelle Faguette as a domestic servant and nursemaid at their residence near Pellevoisin, the Château de Poiriers-Montbel. A woman of fragile health, after numerous years in service, Faguette was dying of tuberculosis at the age of 33.

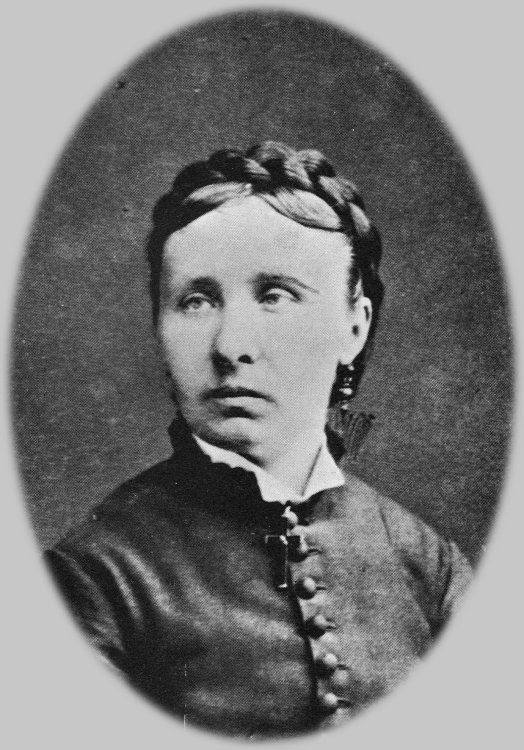
Estelle Faguette

Faguette composed a letter to the Blessed Virgin Mary in which she asked for a cure. The letter was laid at the feet of a statue of the Virgin in Montbel, the summer chateau of the Rochefoucaulds, about 3 km (1.9 mi) from Pellevoisin.

In February 1876, the Countess had to travel to Paris but arranged for accommodation to be made available for Faguette in a house close to the parish church in Pellevoisin. Unable to consume anything except liquids, Faguette received the sacrament of extreme unction. On 14 February, her physician judged that she had only hours left to live.

During the night of that same day, Faguette reported experiencing the presence of the Virgin Mary for the first time, who told her that she must suffer for five more days in honour of the five wounds of Christ. At the end of the five days, Faguette would die or be cured; and if she lived, she would obliged to make known "Mary's glory".

On each of the following four nights Mary appeared again to Faguette. On Tuesday, she said: "If my son grants you life, it will be a blessing for you." On Wednesday, she said, "I am all-merciful and the mistress of my Son. Your good deed, fervent prayers and little letter have touched my motherly heart".

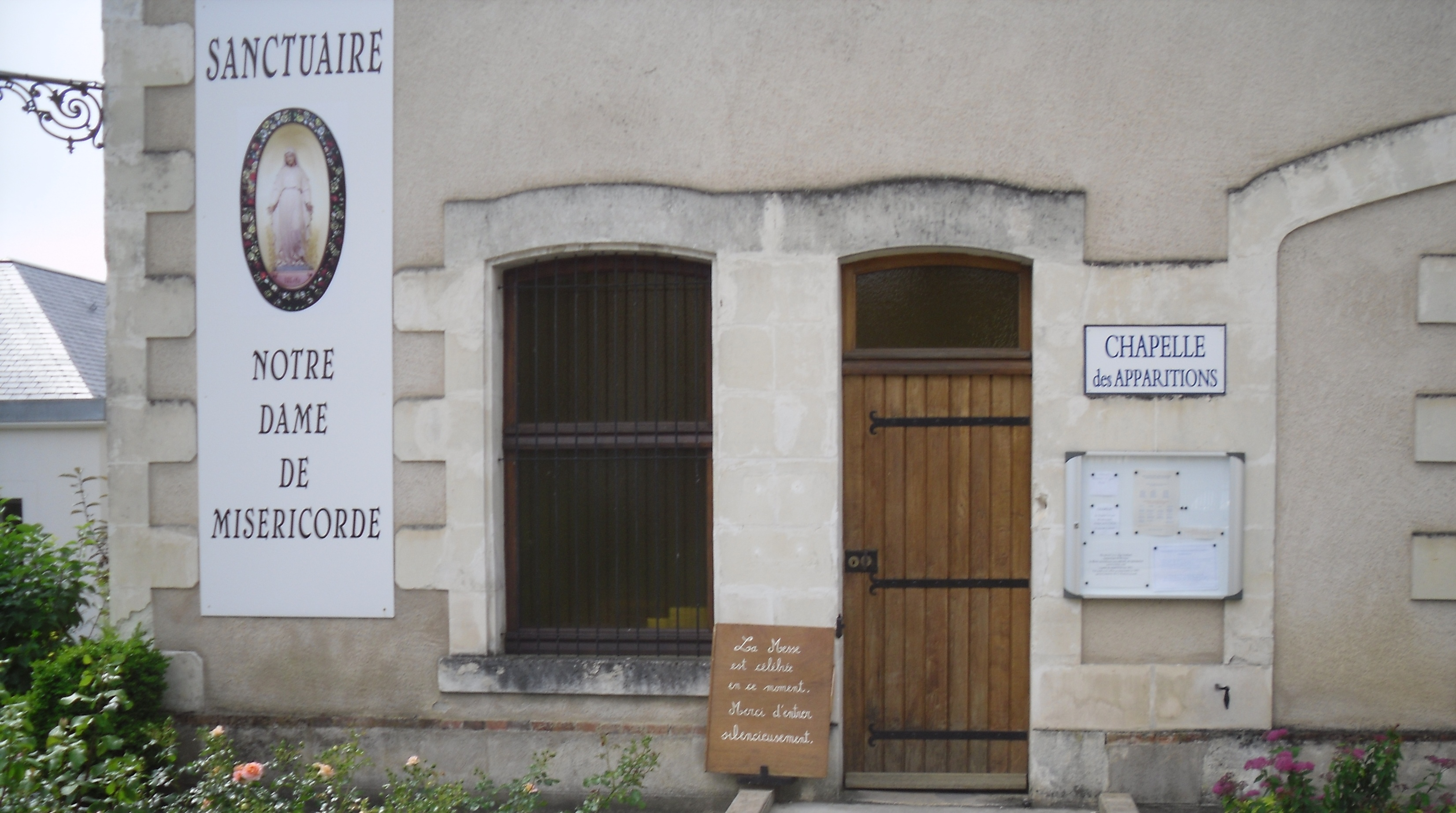
The Chapel of the Apparitions of the Blessed Virgin Mary in Pellevoisin

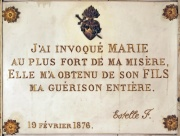
Estelle Faguette commissioned and placed this plaque in Pellevoisin as a thanksgiving for her recovery from a grave illness

On Friday night, Mary did not come and stand at the foot of the bed, as on the previous nights, but drew close to her. She showed Faguette the plaque which she must have placed as a thanksgiving, bearing the words: "I called upon Mary in the depths of my misery. She obtained for me, from her Son, my complete cure." The plaque was not plain white, but had a golden rose on each corner, and at the top, a heart on fire, crowned with roses, pierced by a sword. On Saturday, Faguette was cured when she received Holy Communion. Immediately she was able to eat and drink normally, and within a few days, she resumed domestic and gardening duties with no sign of fatigue.

The next three apparitions occurred on three consecutive days starting on 1 July, during which Faguette reported the apparition as having said: "My son's heart is so full of love that he will not refuse my demands. I have chosen this particular place for the conversion of sinners. I would like you to remain very peaceful about this!"

Faguette saw further apparitions of the Virgin Mary on September 9, 10 and 15; on 9 September, Mary drew attention to a small scapular she was wearing. Faguette had seen it there before, as plain white cloth, but on this day it bore the red image of a heart. "This devotion pleases me", Mary said, and then, "It is here that I shall be honoured". Mary next appeared on 15 September, speaking of her concern for the Catholic Church in France.

Three further visions followed in November (1 November, All Saints' Day; 5 November and 11 November). On 11 November, Faguette set about making a replica of the scapular which she had seen Mary wearing. On that day's apparition, the Virgin told Faguette "You have been working for me".

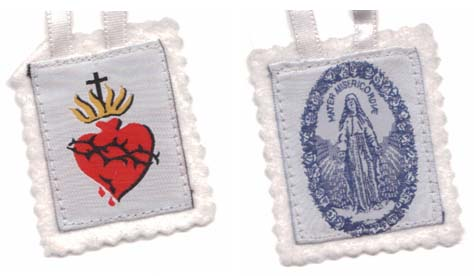
Model of the Scapular of the Sacred Heart revealed by the Virgin Mary to Estelle Faguette in Pellevoisin

The final and culminating vision took place on 8 December 1876, the Solemnity of the Immaculate Conception, during Faguette reported the Virgin Mary to have said:

I have many graces in store for those who wear this scapular with trust in me. These graces are my Son's; I bring them from His Heart; he will refuse me nothing.

Mary then asked Faguette to show the scapular to the local bishop and ask his assistance in promoting it.

== Pontifical approbations ==
The initial enquiries regarding the claims of apparition and healing were carried out by the former Archbishop of Bourges, Charles-Amable de la Tour d'Auvergne.

On 30 April 1876, with the permission of the Archbishop, she had an ex voto plaque of thanksgiving placed in the parish church. On December 8, her bedroom was transformed into an oratory. A few days later, the Archbishop received her for a private audience and granted permission for her to make and distribute copies of the Scapular of the Sacred Heart.

In 1877, the Archbishop set up an enquiry and interviewed 56 persons who knew Faguette; apart from one who preferred not to comment, all spoke favourably. A second enquiry was conducted in December 1878, with similar results.

A confraternity of titled "Most Merciful Mother’" was erected on 28 July 1877. No explicit mention was made of Pellevoisin in connection with its approval (but there was reference to Saint Margaret Mary Alacoque, a nun who had received visions of the Sacred Heart of Jesus). Its statutes were approved on August 27.

In 1892, Pope Leo XIII offered two signs of favour to the shrine: awarding a candle, and declaring certain indulgences for pilgrims who visited the shrine. On 8 May 1894, he raised the confraternity to the status of 'honorary Archconfraternity' and, on 12 May 1896, to 'effective Archconfraternity'. The same Pontiff later received Estelle Faguette in private audiences on 30 January and 17–18 February 1900, during which he agreed that the relevant Vatican department, the Sacred Congregation of Rites, should consider authorising use of the Scapular of the Sacred Heart. Formal recognition was given on 4 April 1900.

In 1893, Archbishop Jean-Pierre Boyer (cardinal) invited the Dominican Order of Catholic friars to establish a monastery in a house nearby her oratory.

In 14 October 1897, Archbishop Pierre-Paul Servonnet renewed permissions given by his predecessors for information about the shrine to be published. In 1899, following numerous petitions from France and Canada, he opened a third canonical enquiry, which again found her to be a credible and favorable witness.

On 16 April 1903, Madame de la Rochefoucauld, who still had administrative rights over the private property containing the oratory, closed it to the general public. The annual pilgrimage still took place on 9 September 1903 with a crowd gathering at the railings of the property; 40 police officers attended. On 19 July 1905, Archbishop Servonnet issued an order that crowds must not gather in front of the oratory.

On 17 October 1915, Pope Benedict XV commented that Our Lady had chosen Pellevoisin as a privileged place to dispense her graces.

On 22 December 1922, the Sacred Congregation of Rites authorised a votive Mass of the namesake Marian title to be celebrated on 9 September in the parish church and adjoining monastery.

On 7 June 1936, the Vatican Secretary of State, Cardinal Eugenio Pacelli sent an image painting of Our Lady of Pellevoisin as a gift to the Dominican community.

On 7 December 1981, Archbishop Paul Vignancour established a medical commission to examine the apparently miraculous cure. On 6 September 1982, having received its report that the cure was still inexplicable in the light of current medical science, Vignacour established a theological commission to consider whether this cure might appropriately be called 'miraculous'. On 4 September 1983, while speaking at the annual pilgrimage to Pellevoisin, he announced the commission's findings that the cure had a 'miraculous character'. That was formally confirmed, in writing, on 8 September.

On 19 September 1984, an Imprimatur was granted for a novena to Our Lady of Pellevoisin.

On 22 August 2024 Pope Francis approved the letter of The Dicastery for the Doctrine of the Faith which gives its consent to the "nihil obstat" proposed by the Archbishop of Bourges concerning devotion to Our Lady of Mercy at the Marian shrine in the small French town.

== Current Marian shrine ==
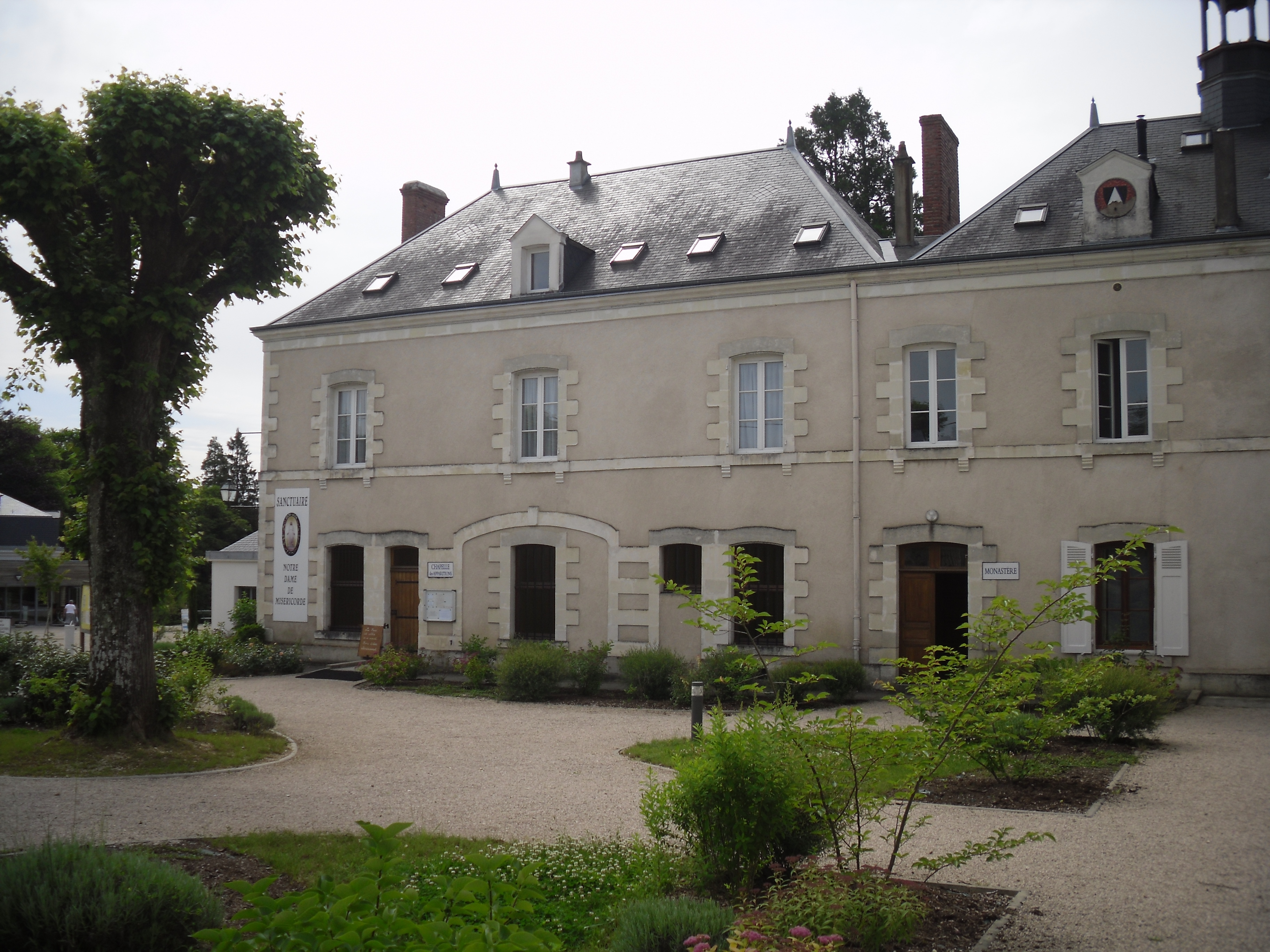
The house in Pellevoisin, France, where domestic servant, Estelle Faguette, claimed to have received visions of the Virgin Mary. It is now a monastery of the Community of St. John.

The Sanctuary of Our Lady of Pellevoisin was under the care of the Dominican friars for 105 years from 1895, but since 1998, it has been served by friars and sisters of the Community of Saint John. A community of contemplative sisters form the Monastery of the Merciful Mother, and the friars form the Priory of Saint Mary Magdalen. The main spiritual activities are daily Mass at 11:30, a weekend celebrating God's mercy around the Second Sunday of Easter each year (Divine Mercy Sunday in the Roman Catholic Church) and the annual pilgrimage on the last weekend in August. Pilgrimages by groups and individuals are welcome throughout the year.
