= Scapular of the Sacred Heart =

Catholic devotional object

The Scapular of the Sacred Heart is a Roman Catholic devotional scapular bearing an image of the Sacred Heart of Jesus on the front panel, and an image of the Virgin Mary as Mother of Mercy on the panel which hangs at the wearer's back. In its current form, the design and the formal church approval for its use are due to Estelle Faguette, a French domestic servant, who in 1876 claimed to have received a series of apparitions during which the Virgin Mary showed this scapular and spoke about its use.

Prior to Faguette's 1876 claims, devotion to the Sacred Heart of Jesus had been made popular by the 17th Century mystic, Margaret Mary Alacoque who herself made and distributed 'badges' bearing images of the Sacred Heart of Jesus.

== Badge of the Sacred Heart ==
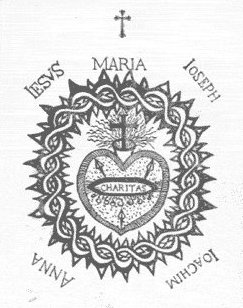
This is a depiction of the Sacred Heart of Jesus by Catholic visionary Margaret Mary Alacoque

Margaret Mary Alacoque, a Visitation Sister in Paray-le-Monial, France, claimed to have experienced visions of Jesus Christ during which he showed her his Sacred Heart. On 2 March 1686, she wrote to her Superior, Mother Saumaise, that the Jesus wished 'for her to order a picture of the image of that Sacred Heart for people specifically to venerate and have in their homes and also small pictures to carry with them'.

During the 18th Century, a Visitation sister, Ana Magdalena Rémuzat (1696-1730) worked hard to spread these badges. They were popular as a protection during the plague of Marseilles and also during the persecutions of the Catholics during the French Revolution.

Marie Leszczyńska, wife of King Louis XV also enthusiastically promoted this badge. Pope Benedict XIV sent a gift of numerous red taffeta Badges of the Sacred Heart with gold embroidery, for her wedding in 1748. In 1872 Pope Pius IX granted an indulgence for the wearing of this badge.

== Scapular of the Sacred Heart ==
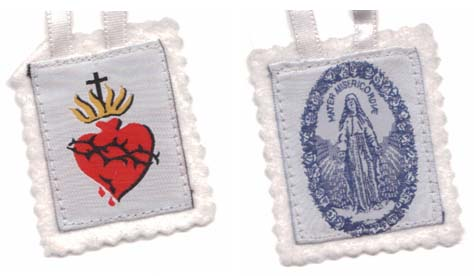
Model of the Scapular of the Sacred Heart revealed by the Blessed Virgin Mary to Estelle Faguette in Pellevoisin.

On the night of 14 February 1876, as she lay in Pellevoisin dying of pulmonary tuberculosis, Estelle Faguette, a domestic servant, reportedly saw the Virgin Mary. Four days later, during the fifth apparition, Faguette seemed to be healed instantaneously. Altogether she experienced fifteen apparitions in the course of 1876. On 9 September, the apparition drew attention to a small piece of white cloth, a scapular, resting over her chest. Faguette had seen it there before, as plain white cloth, but on this day it bore the red image of a heart. The following day the lady appeared again, saying she had come to encourage people to pray.

The final and culminating vision took place on Friday 8 December 1876, the Solemnity of the Immaculate Conception.

You will go yourself to the prelate and will present to him this copy that you have made. Tell him to do everything within his power to help you, and that nothing would be more pleasing to me than to see this livery on each of my children. They should all strive to make reparation for the outrages my Son is subjected to in the sacrament of His love. See the graces that will be poured forth on those who will wear it with confidence and help you to spread this devotion.

Faguette asked the lady what design should appear on the other panel of the scapular. The answer came: 'I reserve it for myself. You will submit your idea and the Church will decide.'

Immediately following this last apparition, Faguette sought and was granted an audience with the then Archbishop of Bourges, Charles-Amable de la Tour d’Auvergne. By 12 December 1876 she had received his permission to make and distribute copies of the Scapular of the Sacred Heart.

In 1877, the Archbishop set up an enquiry into the reliability of Faguette as a witness, visited Rome to seek advice from Pope Pius IX, erected a local confraternity dedicated to the All-Merciful Mother, directed his Vicar General to lead a pilgrimage at Pellevoisin, gave his permission for the first printing of a text concerning Faguette's experiences, and visited the room which had been Faguette's bedroom but which by October 1877 had already been transformed into a chapel.

Pope Leo XIII received Faguette in audiences on 30 January and 17–18 February 1900, during which the Pontiff agreed that the relevant Vatican department, the Congregation of Rites, should consider authorising use of the Scapular of the Sacred Heart. This formal recognition was given on 4 April 1900.

In July 1900 Pope Leo XIII, influenced by Mary of the Divine Heart's January 1899 letter assuring that God would preserve his own health until the world was consecrated to the Sacred Heart, granted many indulgences for the pious wearing of this scapular.

On 22 November 1922, Pope Pius XI granted to the parish clergy of Pellevoisin and directors of the fraternity, the authority to bless the scapular and to pass on this authority to others.

While the use of the scapular is authorised by the Holy See, the Archbishops of Bourges have never officially commented on the status of Faguette's reputed visions, although her cure has been formally recognised as a miracle.

== See also ==
- Scapular of the Immaculate Heart of Mary
- The Badge of the Immaculate Heart of Mary
- Detente bala, a patch with an image of the Sacred Heart worn by Spanish soldiers as an amulet.
