= Detente bala =

Detente!

Detente! - Prayer

"Detente bala" is an inscription used by Spanish soldiers from the 18th century.

The phrase detente bala means "stop, bullet" in Spanish. The whole motto is usually written ¡Detente bala, el Corazón de Jesús está conmigo! meaning: "Stop bullet, the Sacred Heart of Jesus is with me (or protects me)!"

Patches of cloth with the phrase around a Sacred Heart of Jesus were worn on the chest as a protection and later as a piece of cloth under the name/rank badge (usually as close to the heart as possible). The devotion is derived by the badges of the Sacred Heart promoted by 17th-century saint Margaret Mary Alacoque against epidemics. They are still used by the Spanish soldiers in the 21st century.

The history of the use of the "Detente bala" dates back to 1686. Popular belief explains that Saint Margaret Mary Alacoque started the custom of wearing a small cloth emblem with the image of the Sacred Heart of Jesus as a symbol of devotion. This symbol soon began to spread as a protection "amulet" against the epidemics that devastated Europe with the name of "Safeguard" initially and "stop" with the passage of time. It is from the eighteenth century when its use became popular among Spanish soldiers. Tradition has it that the "Detente bala" were embroidered by hand by the wives, mothers or sisters of the combatants before they left for the war, in the hope that they would stop the bullets that threatened their lives and return them safe and sound to their homes.
