= Verosvres =

- Commune
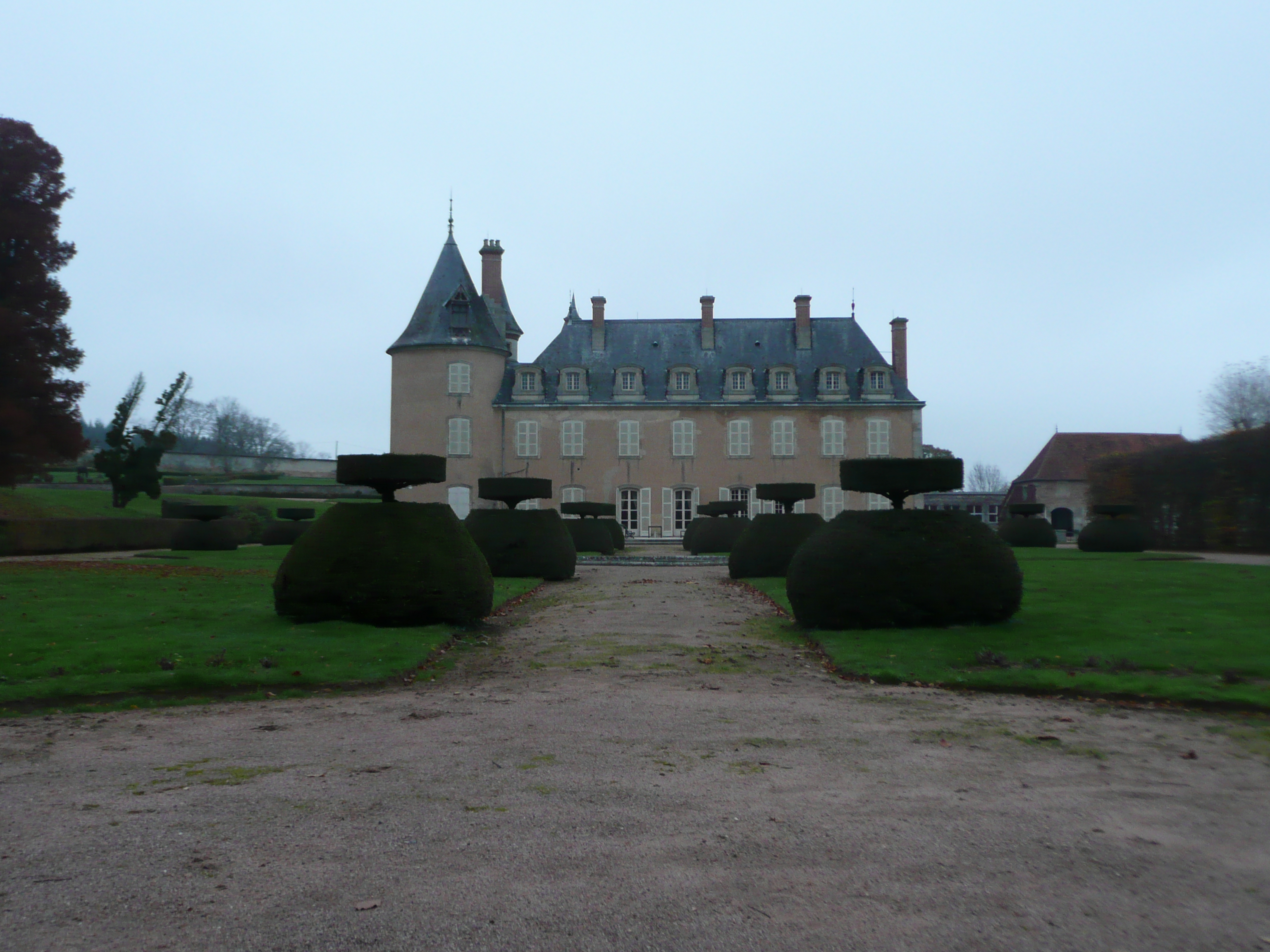
- Chateau of Terreau
- Location of Verosvres
- Location within France Location within Bourgogne-Franche-Comté
- Coordinates: 46°24′05″N 4°26′38″E
- Country: France
- Region: Bourgogne-Franche-Comté
- Department: Saône-et-Loire
- Arrondissement: Mâcon
- Canton: La Chapelle-de-Guinchay

Government
  - Mayor (2024–2026): Laurence Guilloux
- Area^{1}: 22.96 km^{2} (8.86 sq mi)
- Elevation: 386 m (1,266 ft)
- Highest elevation: 596 m (1,955 ft)
- Lowest elevation: 326 m (1,070 ft)
- Population (2023): 423
  - Density: 18.4/km^{2} (47.7/sq mi)
- Time zone: UTC+01:00 (CET)
  - Summer (DST): UTC+02:00 (CEST)
- INSEE/Postal code: 71571 /71220
- ^{1} French Land Register data, which excludes lakes, ponds, glaciers > 1 km^{2} (0.386 sq mi or 247 acres) and river estuaries.

Verosvres (French pronunciation: [veʁovʁ]) is a commune in the Saône-et-Loire department in the region of Bourgogne-Franche-Comté in eastern France.

== History ==
The name Verosvres is derived from the Gallic word Verobriga, vero meaning "true" or "good" and briga meaning "fortress": thus giving "Good castle".

In 1920, the town of Verosvres formed "an agglomeration of about eighty houses, including one for the post office and telegraph." The town was then served by a railway line, now defunct, which connected Paray-le-Monial to Mâcon, and stopped at a station called "Les Terreaux — Verosvres".

== Notable people ==
- Verosvres is the birthplace of Saint Margaret Mary Alacoque, who first inspired devotion to the Sacred Heart of Jesus in the Roman Catholic Church.
- Pierre Albuisson (born in 1952), French postage stamp engraver and designer, presides the Art du timbre gravé association whose headquarters are located in Verosvres.

== See also ==
- Communes of the Saône-et-Loire department
