= Pellevoisin =

- Commune
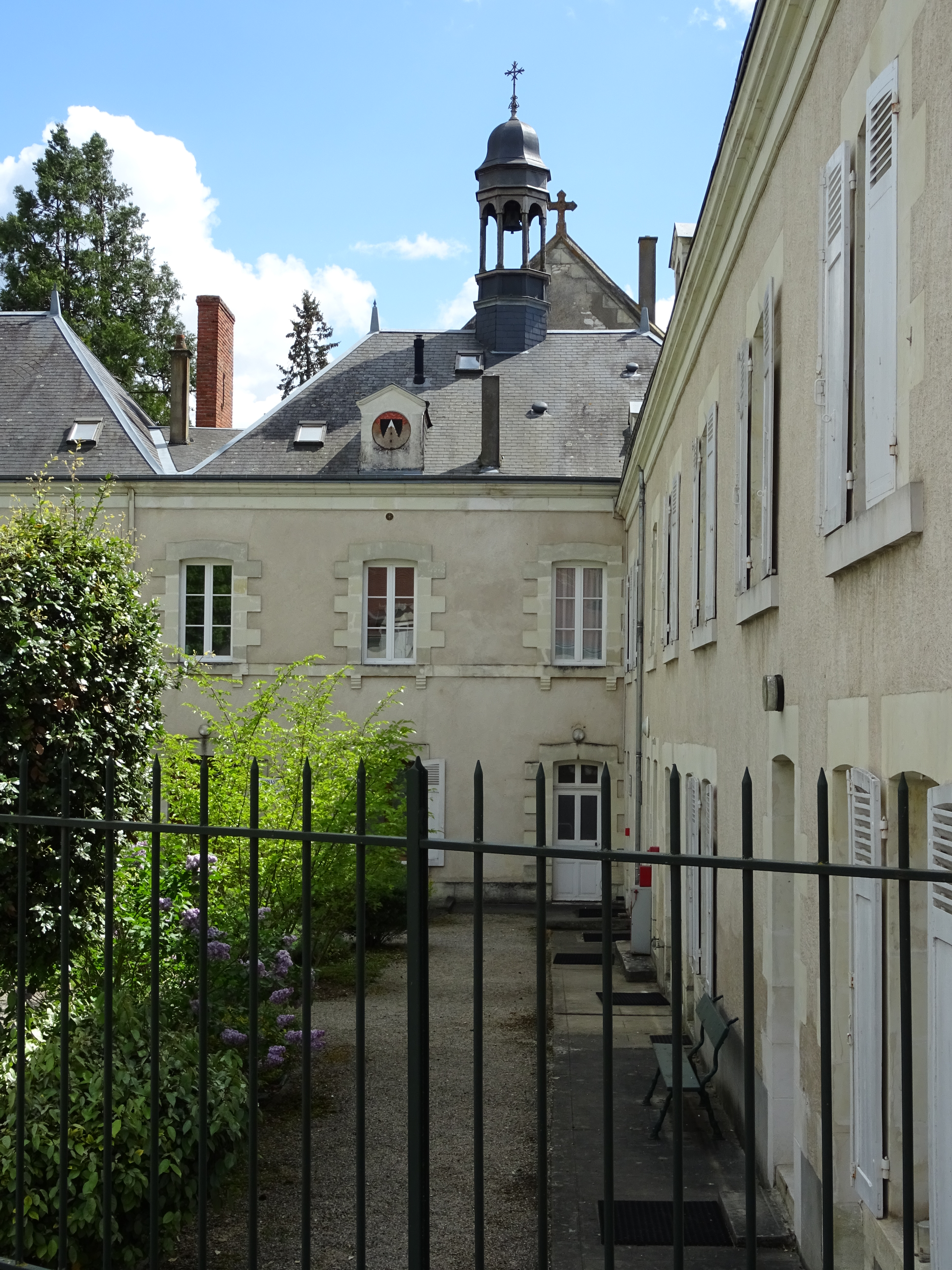
- The convent and Marian shrine in Pellevoisin
- Location of Pellevoisin
- Location within France Location within Centre-Val de Loire
- Coordinates: 46°59′04″N 1°24′54″E
- Country: France
- Region: Centre-Val de Loire
- Department: Indre
- Arrondissement: Châteauroux
- Canton: Valençay
- Intercommunality: Écueillé-Valençay

Government
  - Mayor (2020–2026): Gérard Sauget
- Area^{1}: 25.62 km^{2} (9.89 sq mi)
- Elevation: 168 m (551 ft)
- Highest elevation: 192 m (630 ft)
- Lowest elevation: 117 m (384 ft)
- Population (2023): 792
  - Density: 30.9/km^{2} (80.1/sq mi)
- Time zone: UTC+01:00 (CET)
  - Summer (DST): UTC+02:00 (CEST)
- INSEE/Postal code: 36155 /36180
- ^{1} French Land Register data, which excludes lakes, ponds, glaciers > 1 km^{2} (0.386 sq mi or 247 acres) and river estuaries.

Pellevoisin (French pronunciation: [pɛlvwazɛ̃]) is a commune in the Indre department in central France.

== Marian apparitions ==
On the night of 14 February 1876, as she lay in Pellevoisin dying of pulmonary tuberculosis, Estelle Faguette, a domestic servant, reportedly saw the Virgin Mary. Four days later, during the fifth apparition, Estelle seemed to be healed instantaneously. Subsequently, she had 10 other apparitions until 8 December 1876. She lived another fifty years, dying in 1929. She stated that Mary told her, 'If you want to serve me, be simple, and let your words and deeds agree'; that Mary asked that people should wear a scapular of the Sacred Heart, and that Mary indicated that she was distressed by people's neglect of her Son in prayer and the Blessed Sacrament.

The archbishops of Bourges have never pronounced on Estelle Faguette's reputed visions, although her cure has been formally recognised as a miracle; the Vatican has also given its approval for use of the Scapular of the Sacred Heart.

The Shrine of Our Lady of Pellevoisin which was built with the help of the La Rochefoucauld-Montbel family is now entrusted to friars and sisters of the Community of St Jean; an annual pilgrimage takes place there on the last weekend in August.

== Population ==
Historical population
Year	Pop.	±% p.a.
1968	940	—
1975	926	−0.21%
1982	1,027	+1.49%
1990	916	−1.42%
1999	886	−0.37%
2007	875	−0.16%
2012	846	−0.67%
2017	758	−2.17%
2023	792	+0.73%
Source: INSEE

== See also ==
- Communes of the Indre department
- Marian apparition
