= Dominique de La Rochefoucauld-Montbel =

French humanitarian diplomat (born 1950)

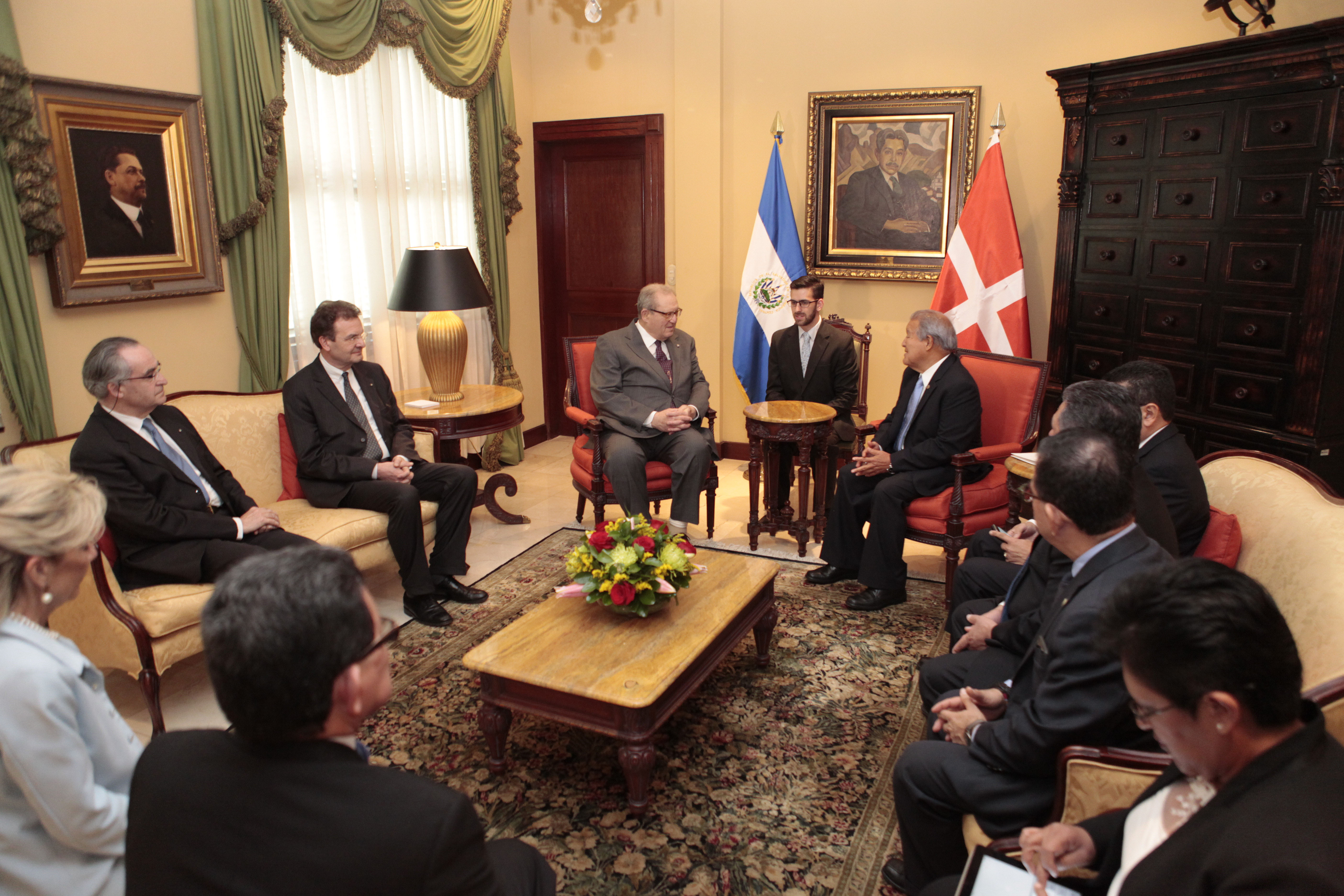
Prince de La Rochefoucauld-Montbel, Grand Hospitaller, seated on the sofa on the left during a diplomatic visit of the Order of Malta

Dominique de La Rochefoucauld-Montbel (born 6 July 1950, in Neuilly-sur-Seine, France) is a French humanitarian diplomat and member of the House of La Rochefoucauld. He is an Officer of the Légion d'Honneur and has served as Grand Hospitaller and president of the French Association of the Sovereign Military Order of Malta.

== Family ==
La Rochefoucauld-Montbel married Pascale Marie Subtil, a financial controller and auditor (Dauphine University), in January 1984 in Connantre. They have three children: Marie, Gabriel, and Anne.

In recent history, he is a descendant of the following notable figures:

- Jean-Joseph, Marquis Dessolles, Grand Cross of the Légion d'honneur, general under Bonaparte and Napoleon, and Prime Minister under Louis XVIII; and General Auguste Dampierre, both of whose names are inscribed under the Arc de Triomphe in Paris.
- Adélaïde de La Rochefoucauld, cousin and dame d'honneur to Empress Joséphine, and her husband Alexandre, ambassador of the Emperor and Grand Officer of the Légion d'honneur, son of François XII, Duke de La Rochefoucauld-Liancourt.
- Louis-Joseph de Montbel, field marshal and First Chamberlain of Charles X.
- General François de Négrier, whose heart rests in the Invalides in Paris in the crypt of the governors. His nephew, General Oscar de Négrier, Grand Cross of the Légion d'honneur, was the godfather of Simone Darblay de La Rochefoucauld-Montbel.

La Rochefoucauld-Montbel is the son of Charles Emmanuel and Joanna Forbes. He succeeded his father as Prince (Fürst) de La Rochefoucauld, a title granted to his great-grandfather Jules by the King of Bavaria in 1909. He also holds the French title of Count de La Rochefoucauld-Montbel. The La Rochefoucauld-Montbel family is listed in the Almanach de Gotha.

The princely branch of the family is closely associated with the Marian apparitions of Pellevoisin in France and with the discovery of the Lascaux Caves, which they once owned. This branch descends from the Dukes of Estissac and, through marriages, is connected to the Borghese of Roman nobility.

== Education and activities ==
La Rochefoucauld-Montbel attended Worth School near Crawley, England, where one of his teachers was Fra' Andrew Bertie, who later became Grand Master of the Sovereign Military Order of Malta. He also studied at the Collège Champittet near Lausanne and the Institut Florimont near Geneva. He went on to study economics at the Institut supérieur du commerce de Paris.

From 1975 to 2004, he pursued a career in finance, working primarily in the gold market and currency exchange operations. Since 2003, he has managed a real estate consultancy and asset management company.

He serves as president of the SMLH Paris 17th section (an association of members of the Légion d'honneur) and as an administrator of the Society of the Friends of the Musée de la Légion d'honneur. He is also chancellor of the Académie des Psychologues du Goût.

In addition, he is president of the Foundation for Evangelization through the Media (FEM), created in 2008, and a shareholder in the media outlet Aleteia.

On 25 February 2025, he participated in the visit of Monsignor Celestino Migliore, Apostolic Nuncio to France, to the sanctuary of Pellevoisin, following the nihil obstat granted in September 2024 regarding the Marian apparitions reported by Estelle Faguette.

He has had, and continues to have, a long-standing involvement in the Order of Malta (see below).

== Order of Malta ==
In 1992, La Rochefoucauld-Montbel was received into the Order of Malta. In 2008, he took the promise as a Knight in Obedience. He currently holds the rank of Bailiff Knight Grand Cross of Honour and Devotion in Obedience.

La Rochefoucauld-Montbel has served in several positions within the French Association of the Order of Malta: Administrator since 1994, Vice-President from 1996 to 2000, President from 2000 to 2014, and Vice-President from 2014 to 2023.

He has been Vice-President of the French Foundation of the Order of Malta since 2008 and served as the official representative of the Order for the Hospital of the Holy Family in Bethlehem from 2009 to 2014. In 2010, he became a member of the International Hospital Council of the Sovereign Order of Malta in Rome.

In 2012, reflecting the historical ties between the French Navy and the Order of Malta, La Rochefoucauld-Montbel presented decorations to the naval frigates Le Chevalier Paul and Forbin.

At the Chapter General of the Order of Malta held on 30–31 May 2014 in Rome, La Rochefoucauld-Montbel was elected Grand Hospitaller. He was re-elected at the Chapter General held on 1–2 May 2019. In this capacity, he was responsible for the Order's humanitarian affairs and international cooperation worldwide. He also served as director of the Global Fund for Forgotten People.

He currently serves as Vice-President of the Foundation of the Order of Malta and President of its Historical Academy.

== Honours and decorations ==
France: Officer of the Légion d'honneur (31 December 2014) – Knight (12 November 2004)

France: Knight of the National Order of Merit (2 May 2002)

Holy See: Grand Cross of the Order of St. Gregory the Great (30 January 2024)

SMOM: Bailiff Knight Grand Cross of Honour and Devotion in Obedience, Sovereign Order of Malta

SMOM: Grand Cross of the Order pro Merito Melitensi

Italy: Grand Cross of the Order of Merit of the Italian Republic (9 September 2020)

Spain: Grand Cross of the Order of Isabella the Catholic (29 December 2015)

Cameroon: Grand Cross of the Order of Valour

Poland: Commander of the Order of Merit of the Republic of Poland (9 April 2024)

Armenia: Grand Officer of the Order of Honour

Morocco: Grand Officer of the Order of Ouissam Alaouite

Romania: Grand Officer of the Order of the Star of Romania

Holy See: Grand Cross of Merit of the Order of the Holy Sepulchre

House of Bourbon-Two Sicilies: Bailiff Grand Cross of the Sacred Military Constantinian Order of Saint George
