= Margaret Mary Alacoque =

French Catholic saint and mystic (1647–1690)

Saint Margaret Mary Alacoque VSM
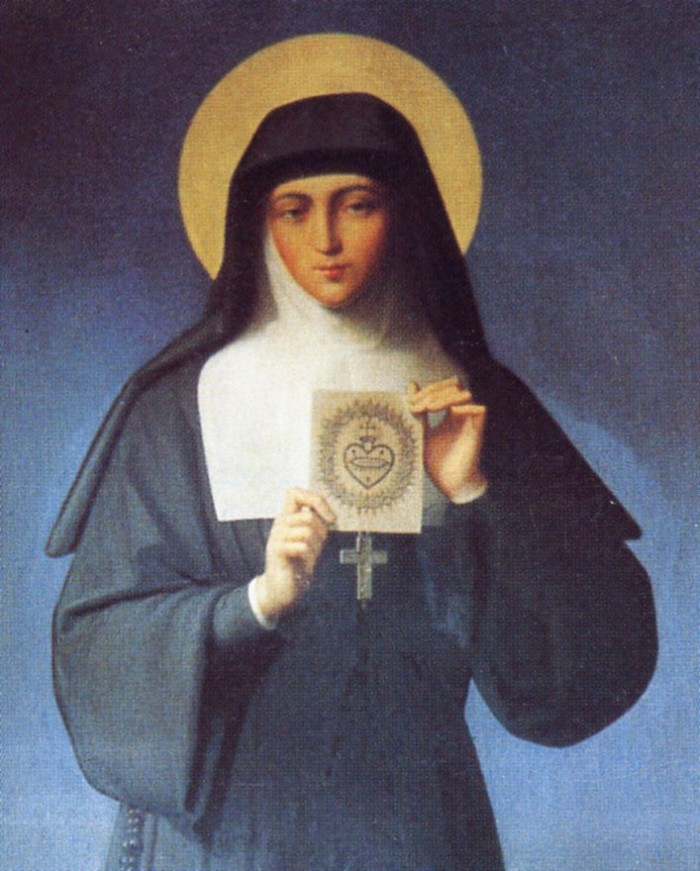
- Portrait of Sister Margaret Mary Alacoque

Virgin
- Born: 22 July 1647; L'Hautecour, Duchy of Burgundy, Kingdom of France
- Died: 17 October 1690 (aged 43); Paray-le-Monial, Duchy of Burgundy, Kingdom of France
- Venerated in: Catholic Church
- Beatified: 18 September 1864, Rome by Pope Pius IX
- Canonized: 13 May 1920, Vatican City by Pope Benedict XV
- Major shrine: Monastery of the Visitation, Paray-le-Monial, Saône-et-Loire, France
- Feast: October 16 (October 17 by the Order of the Visitation of Holy Mary and universally prior to 1969; transferred to Oct 20 in Canada)
- Attributes: wearing the religious habit of the Visitandines and holding an image of the Sacred Heart

Margaret Mary Alacoque VSM (French: Marguerite-Marie Alacoque; 22 July 1647 – 17 October 1690) was a French Visitation nun and mystic who promoted devotion to the Sacred Heart of Jesus in its modern form.

== Biography ==
=== Early life ===
Blason de la famille Alacoque.

Alacoque was born in 1647 in L'Hautecour, Burgundy, France, now part of the commune of Verosvres, then in the Duchy of Burgundy. She was the fifth of seven children, and the only daughter of Claude and Philiberte Lamyn Alacoque. Her father was a well-to-do notary. Her godmother was the Countess of Corcheval. Margaret was described as showing intense love for the Blessed Sacrament from early childhood.

When Margaret was eight years old, her father died of pneumonia. She was sent to a convent school run by the Poor Clares in Charolles, where she made her First Communion at the age of nine. She later contracted rheumatic fever which confined her to bed for four years. At the end of this period, having made a vow to the Blessed Virgin Mary to consecrate herself to religious life, she was instantly restored to perfect health. In recognition of this favor, she added the name "Mary" to her baptismal name of Margaret. According to her later account of her life, she had visions of Jesus Christ, which she thought were a normal part of human experience, and continued to practice austerity.

With the death of Alacoque's father, the family's assets were held by an uncle who refused to hand them over, plunging her family into poverty. During this time, her only consolation was frequent visits to pray before the Blessed Sacrament in the local church. When she was 17, however, her brother came of age, took undisputed possession of the home and things improved. Her mother encouraged her to socialize, in the hopes of her finding a suitable husband. Out of obedience, and believing that her childhood vow was no longer binding, she began to accompany her brothers in the social events, attending dances and balls.

One night, after returning home from a ball for Carnival dressed in her finery, she experienced a vision of Christ, scourged and bloody. He reproached her for her forgetfulness of him; yet he also reassured her by demonstrating that his heart was filled with love for her, because of the childhood promise she had made to his Blessed Mother. As a result, she determined to fulfill her vow and entered, when almost 24 years of age, the Visitation Convent at Paray-le-Monial on 25 May 1671, intending to become a nun.

=== Monastic life ===
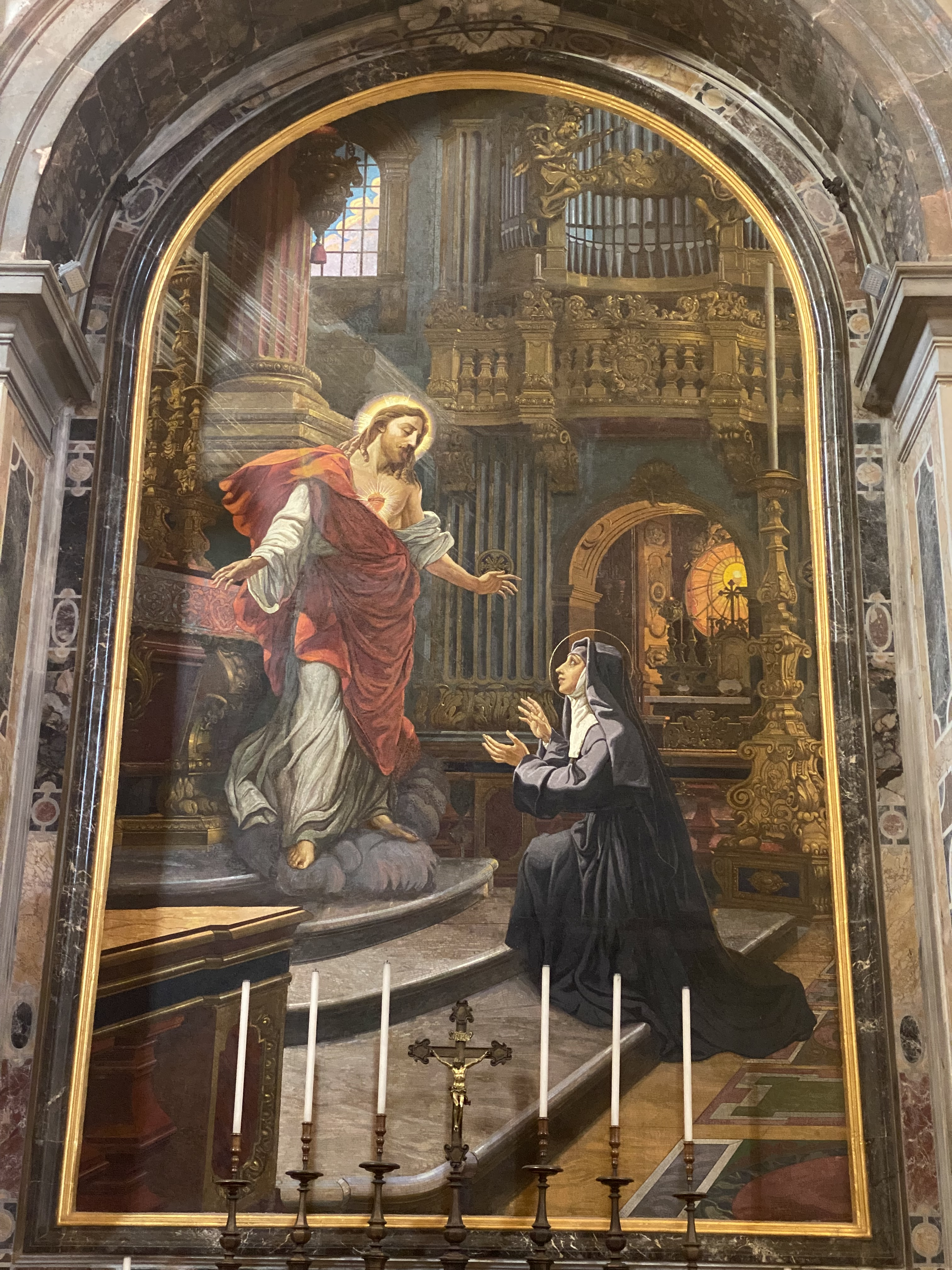
St. Peter’s Basilica, Rome, Italy, The Altar of the Sacred Heart, mosaic. The painting for the mosaic was by Carlo Muccioli in 1919-20

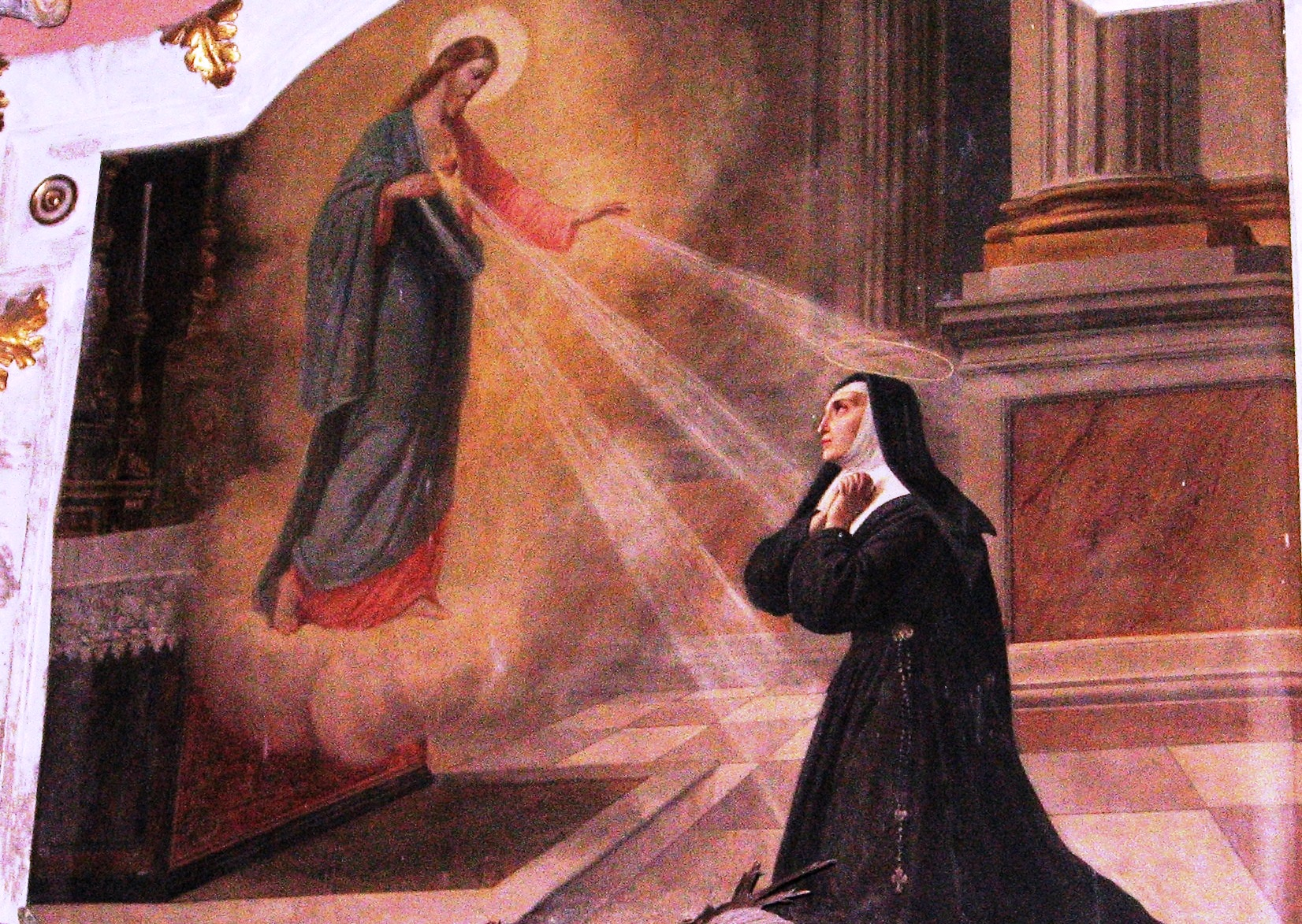
Jesus Christ appearing to St. Margaret Mary, Church of San Michele, Cortemilia, Italy

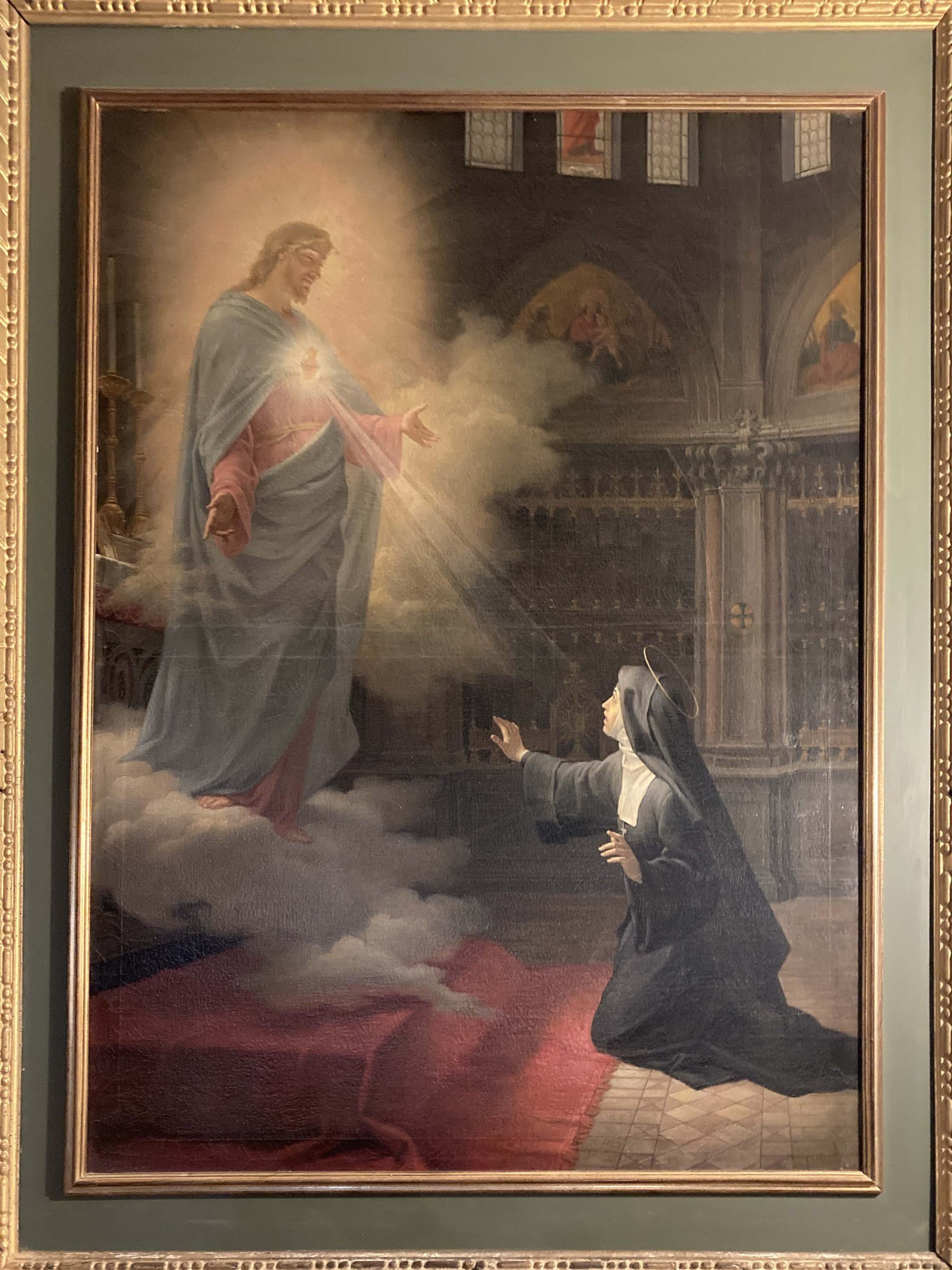
The Vision of the Heart of Jesus by St. Margaret Mary Alacoque by unknown artist

Alacoque was subjected to many trials to prove the genuineness of her vocation. She was admitted to wearing the religious habit on 25 August 1671, but was not allowed to make her religious profession on the same date of the following year, which would have been the usual course. A fellow novice described Margaret Mary as humble, simple and frank, but above all kind and patient. She was finally admitted to profession on 6 November 1672. It is said that she was assigned to the infirmary and was not very skillful at her tasks.

=== Visions ===
At the monastery, Alacoque reportedly received several apparitions and private revelations of Jesus Christ between 27 December 1673 and June 1675. Among other things, these visions revealed to her different forms of devotion to the Sacred Heart.

On 27 December 1673, the feast of St. John, Margaret Mary said that Jesus had permitted her to rest her head upon his heart, and then disclosed to her the wonders of his love, telling her that he desired to make them known to all mankind and to diffuse the treasures of his goodness, and that he had chosen her for this work.

Between 1674 and 1675, other apparitions followed. From the second apparition onwards, a theme of sadness was present in her visions:

"Jesus spoke of the sadness he feels because his great love for humanity receives in exchange "nothing but ingratitude and indifference", "coldness and contempt". And this, he added, "is more grievous to me than all that I endured in my Passion".

The apparitions also revealed practices expressing the devotion to the Sacred Heart. The First Fridays Devotion, which is the reception of Holy Communion on nine first Fridays of each month as an act of reparation, was asked to Margaret Mary and a "Great Promise" was given to those who accomplish it: "I promise you in the excessive mercy of My Heart that My all-powerful love will grant to all those who shall receive communion on the First Friday in nine consecutive months the grace of final penance; they shall not die in My disgrace nor without receiving their sacraments; My Divine Heart shall be their safe refuge in this last moment." In an other vision, Margaret Mary also stated that she was instructed to spend an hour every Thursday night in prayer and meditation on Jesus' Agony in the Garden of Gethsemane : "and on each night of Thursday to Friday, I will make you participate in the mortal sadness that I have accepted to feel in the Garden of Olives, (...), you will get up from eleven until midnight, to prostrate yourself during an hour with Me...". That practice later became widespread among Catholics, known as the Holy Hour, also frequently performed during an hour of Eucharistic adoration on Thursdays.

Between 13 and 20 June 1675, she had a vision of Jesus in which he asked her "that the first Friday after the octave of the Blessed Sacrament be dedicated to a particular feast to honor my heart, by receiving communion on that day and making reparation to it by honorable amends..." That vision later led to the institution of the Feast of the Sacred Heart, which is now a solemnity in the liturgical calendar of the Catholic Church, celebrated eight days after the Feast of Corpus Christi.

On 16 June 1675, Alacoque reported three specific requests for France, directly from her spiritual talks. These would have political and religious repercussions and would successively be realized under the royal, imperial and republican French regimes:

1. The first message was addressed to kings: "He desires to enter pompously and magnificently into the house of princes and kings, to be honored, as much as he has been outraged, despised and humiliated in his passion ... that the adorable Heart of his divine Son was received ... to establish his empire in the heart of our Great Monarch, from which he wants to serve for the execution of his designs."
2. The second message was: "to build a building where the painting of this divine Heart will be, to receive the consecration and the homage of the King and of the whole court ..."
3. The third message asked the King: "to be painted on his standards and engraved on his weapons to make him victorious over all his enemies, by bringing down at his feet the proud and superb heads, in order to make him triumphant to all the enemies of the Holy Church".

Initially discouraged in her efforts to follow the instruction she had received in her visions, Alacoque was eventually able to convince her superior, Mother de Saumaise, of the authenticity of her visions. She was unable, however, to convince a Benedictine and a Jesuit, whom Saumaise had consulted. Nor was she any more successful with many of the members of her own community.

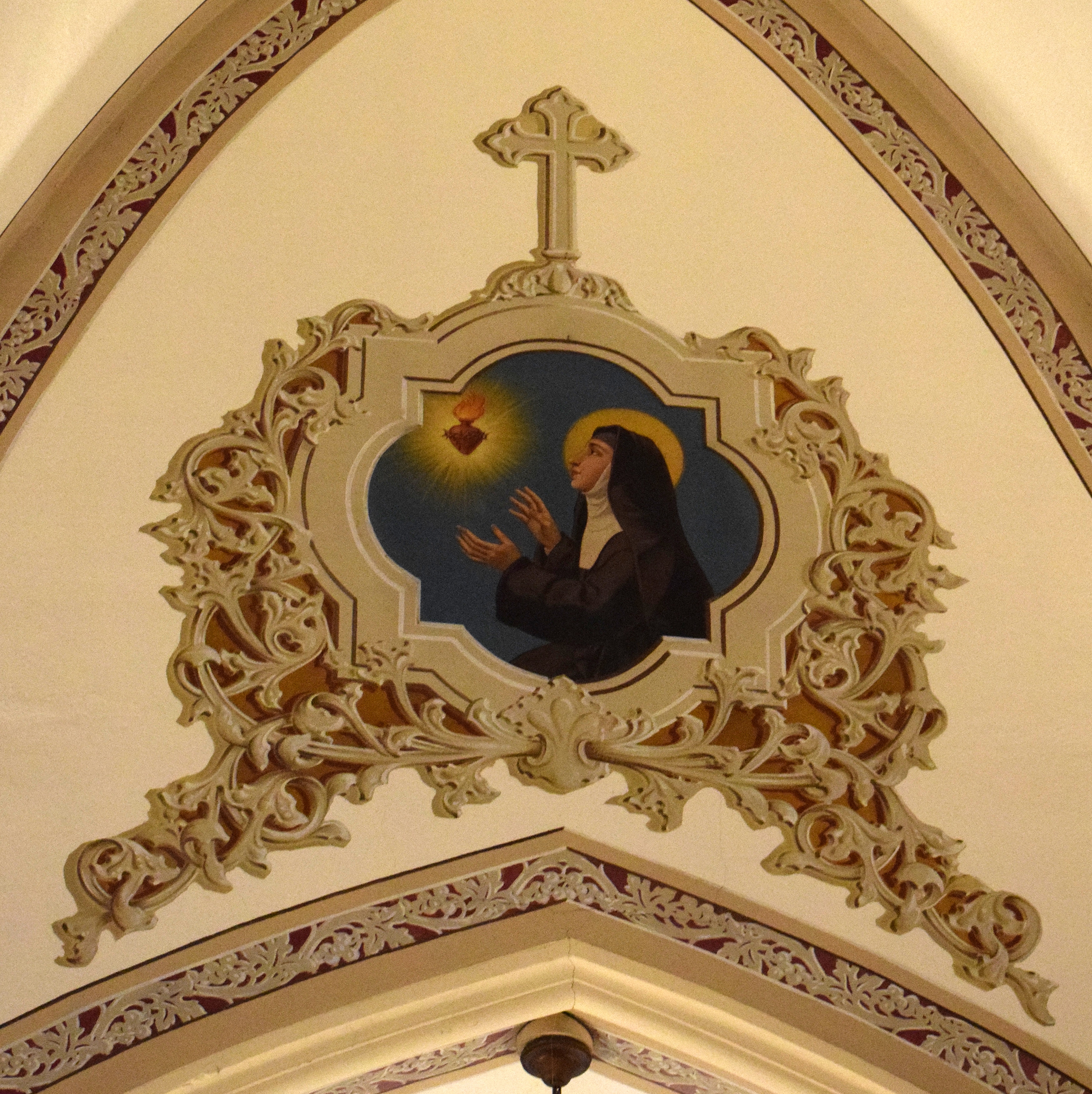
Saint Rose Church (Perrysburg, Ohio) - vault fresco

Sometime around 1681, Alacoque felt compelled to write a personal testament, passionately donating her life completely to Jesus with her own blood. With the permission of her superior she used a pocket knife to carve the name of Jesus into her breast and used the blood to sign the document. The following account recalls this event:

She herself wrote out the donation, and signed this humble formula: 'Sister Peronne-Rosalie Greyfie, at present Superioress, and for whom Sister Margaret Mary daily asks conversion with the grace of final penitence.' This done, Sister Margaret Mary implored Mother Greyfie to allow her, in turn, to sign, but with her blood. The Mother having assented, Sister Margaret Mary went to her cell, bared her breast, and, imitating her illustrious and saintly foundress, cut with a knife the name of Jesus above her heart. From the blood that flowed from the wound she signed the act in these words: 'Sister Margaret Mary, Disciple of the Divine Heart of the Adorable Jesus'

Upset by the fact that the wounds which she had cut into her breast were beginning to fade, she attempted to reopen the original wounds on more than one occasion using a knife. But, having failed to open them to her liking, she decided to burn her chest with fire. This incident placed her in the infirmary: "Trembling and humbled, she went to acknowledge her fault. Mother Greyfie, true to her custom, apparently paid little attention to what Margaret said, but ordered her in a few dry words to go to the infirmary and show her wound to Sister Augustine Marest, who would dress it."

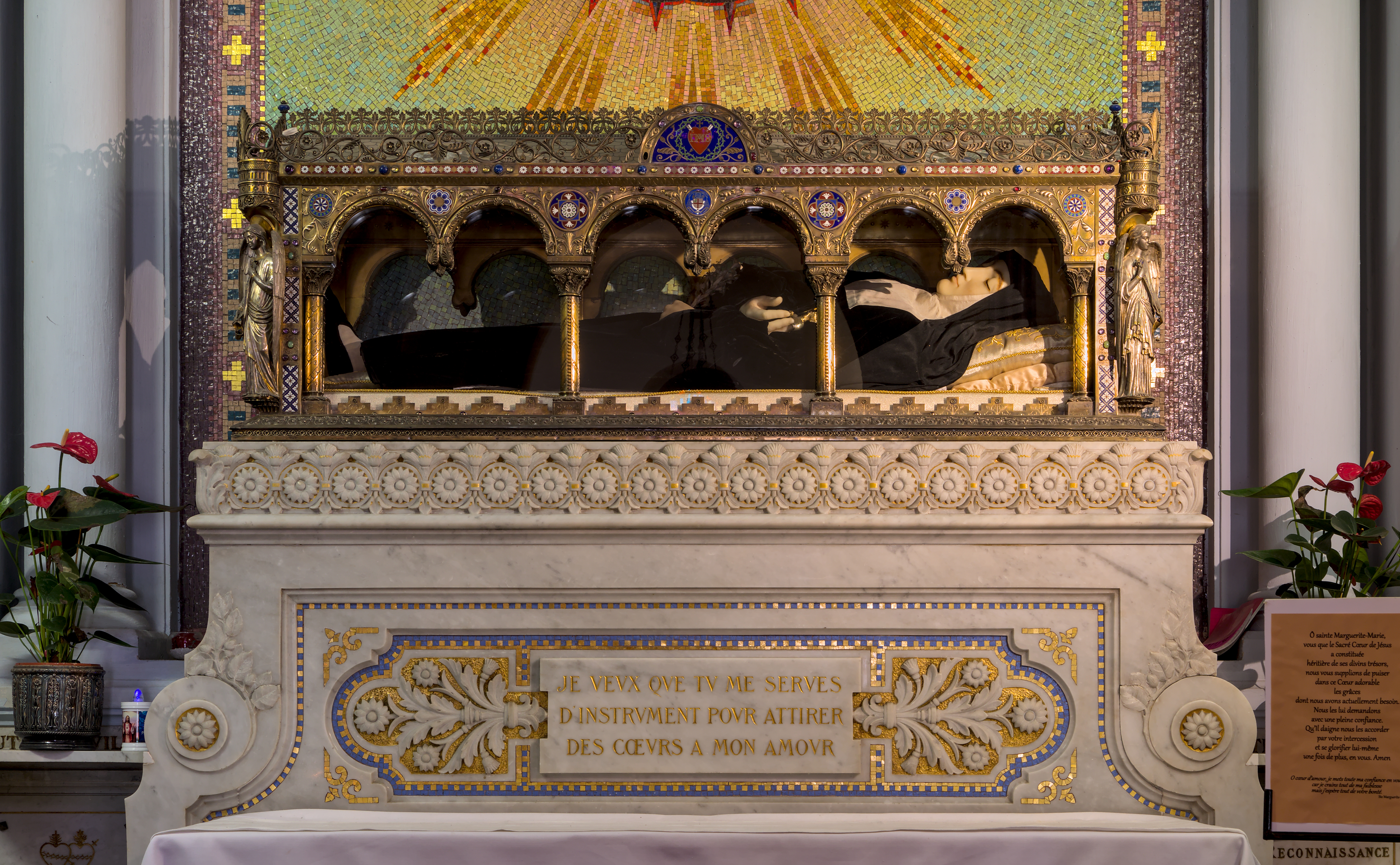
Shrine of Marguerite-Marie Alacoque in the chapel of the Visitation of Paray-le-Monial

She eventually received the support of Claude de la Colombière, the community's confessor for a time, who declared that the visions were genuine. In 1683, opposition in the community ended when Mother Melin was elected Superior and named Margaret Mary her assistant. She later became Novice Mistress, and saw the monastery observe the Feast of the Sacred Heart privately, beginning in 1686. Two years later, a chapel was built at Paray-le-Monial to honor the Sacred Heart. Observation of the feast of the Sacred Heart spread to other Visitation convents.

In 1689, Alacoque received a private request from Jesus to urge the King of France, Louis XIV, to consecrate the nation to the Sacred Heart, so that he may be "triumphant over all the enemies of the Holy Church". Henri Ghéon alludes to a letter she sent to Louis XIV, but notes that "either [he] never received the letter or he refused to reply". Louis XIV's grandson, Louis XVI, had vowed to publicly consecrate himself to the Sacred Heart when he was restored to power, but he and his wife, Marie Antoinette, were executed by guillotine in 1793 before he could do so.

Alacoque died on 17 October 1690.

== Veneration ==
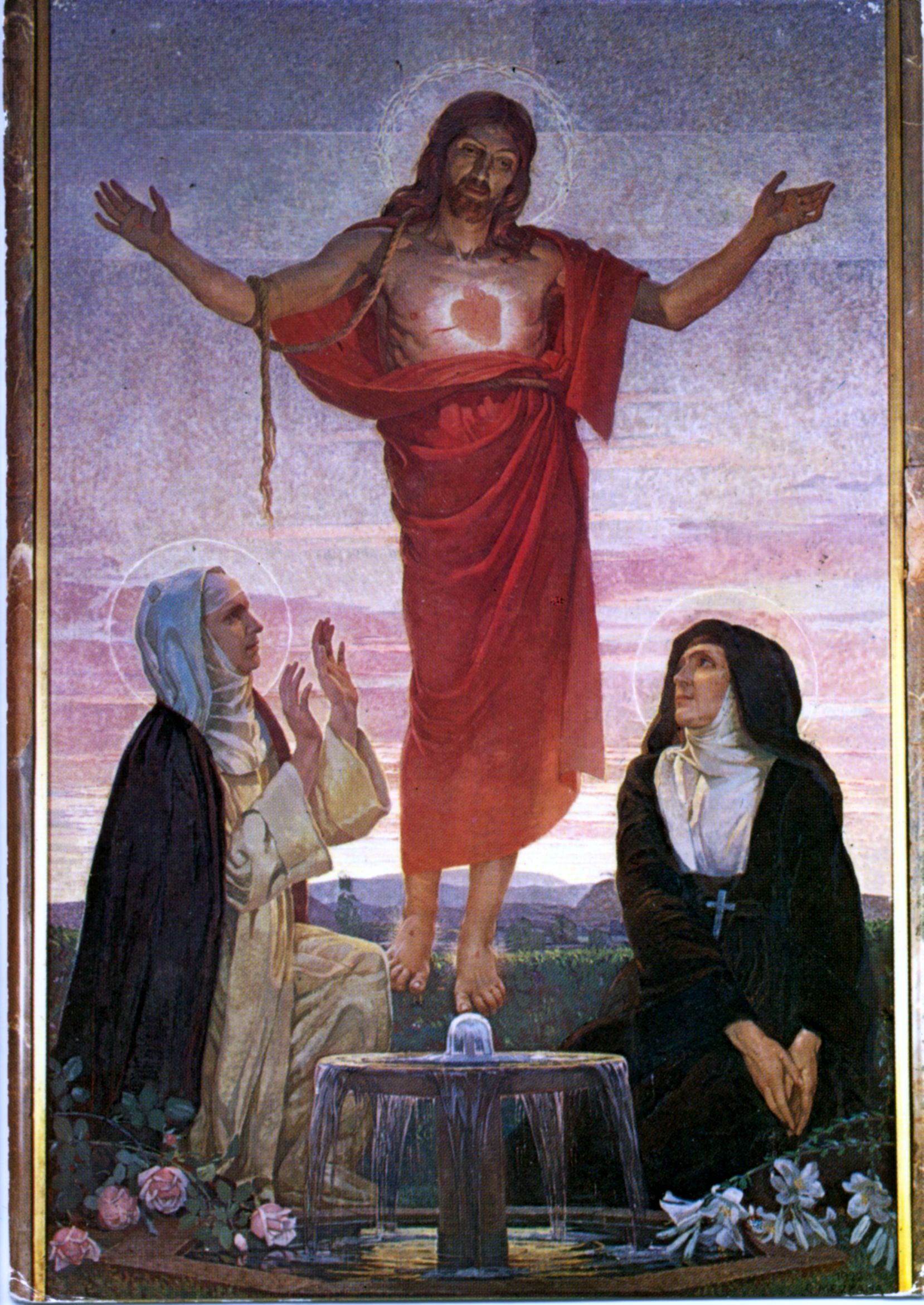
Blessed Mary of the Divine Heart and St. Margarette Mary Alacoque adoring the Sacred Heart of Jesus

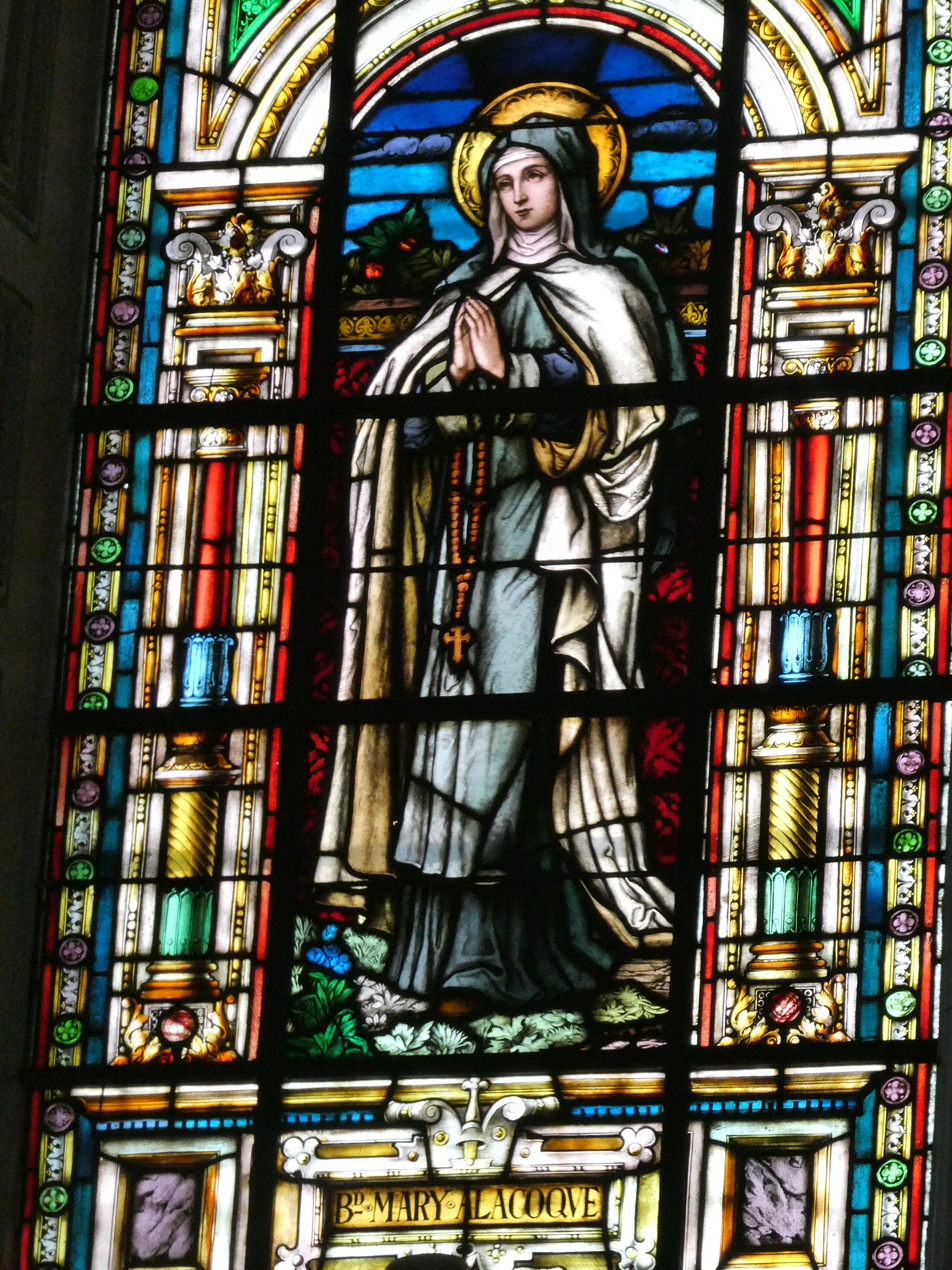
Stained glass image of Mary Alacoque in Clonmel, Ireland

After Alacoque's death, the devotion to the Sacred Heart was fostered by the Jesuits even as it remained controversial within the Catholic Church. The practice was not officially recognized for 75 years. The discussion of Alacoque's own mission and qualities continued for years. All her actions, her revelations, her spiritual maxims, her teachings regarding the devotion to the Sacred Heart, of which she was the chief exponent as well as the apostle, were subjected to the most severe and minute examination.

The Sacred Congregation of Rites eventually voted favorably and Pope Leo XII pronounced her Venerable on 30 March 1824, introducing a cause for her canonization.

Six years later, Commissaries Apostolic were sent to Paray-le-Monial by the Holy See to inspect the virtues of the venerable Alacoque. The Commissaries desired to open her tomb in order to authenticate her remains. When Alacoque's tomb was opened in July 1830, they discovered that her brain had been preserved from corruption, 140 years after her death. Four doctors recorded the miracle in a report and two instantaneous cures were also recorded by the Commissaries. The examination of Alacoque's virtues and writings lasted 14 years. Now, her body rests above the side altar in the Chapel of the Apparitions, located at the Visitation Monastery in Paray-le-Monial, which draws pilgrims from all parts of the world.

On 23 August 1846, Pope Pius IX officially declared her heroic virtues, granting her the title "Servant of God".

On 18 September 1864, Pope Pius IX declared her Blessed. Another tomb opening was done for the process and her brain was still discovered showing signs of incorruptibility, 174 years after her death.

Alacoque was canonized by Pope Benedict XV on 13 May 1920. The two miracles attributed to Alacoque's intercession that are required for the canonization approval were Louise Agostini-Coleshi's instant and complete cure of chronic transverse meningo-myelitis, and Countess Antonia Artorri's instant and complete cure of right papillary cancer. The Pope also inserted the "Great Promise" of the First Fridays Devotion into the Bull of her Canonization.

In his 1928 encyclical Miserentissimus Redemptor, Pope Pius XI affirmed the Catholic Church's position regarding the credibility of her visions of Jesus Christ by speaking of Jesus as having "manifested Himself" to Alacoque and having "promised her that all those who rendered this honour to His Heart would be endowed with an abundance of heavenly graces".

In 1929 her liturgical commemoration was included in the General Roman calendar for celebration on 17 October, the day of her death. During the reforms of 1969, the feast day was moved to 16 October. It is an optional memorial in the United States.

Alacoque's short devotional work, La Devotion au Sacré-Coeur de Jesus (Devotion to the Sacred Heart of Jesus), was published posthumously by J. Croiset in 1698 and has been popular among Catholics.

On the Caribbean island of Saint Lucia there are two flower festivals supported by their respective Societies. Each society has a patron saint on whose feast day the grande fete is celebrated. For the Roses it is the feast of St. Rose of Lima on 30 August; and for the Marguerites it is that of St. Margaret Mary Alacoque, 17 October.

== Quote ==
And He [Christ] showed me that it was His great desire of being loved by men and of withdrawing them from the path of ruin that made Him want to manifest His Heart to men, with all the treasures of love, of mercy, of grace, of sanctification and salvation which it contains, in order that those who desire to render Him and procure Him all the honour and love possible might themselves be abundantly enriched with those divine treasures of which His heart is the source.

— from Revelations of Our Lord to St. Mary Margaret Alacoque

== In popular culture ==
The detente bala amulet used by Spanish soldiers is said to derive from Alacoque's emblems.

In James Joyce's short story "Eveline", in his book Dubliners, a "coloured print of the promises made to Blessed Margaret Mary Alacoque" is mentioned as part of the decorations of an Irish home at the turn of the 20th century, testifying to Joyce's fine eye for the details of Irish Catholic piety.

== Gallery ==
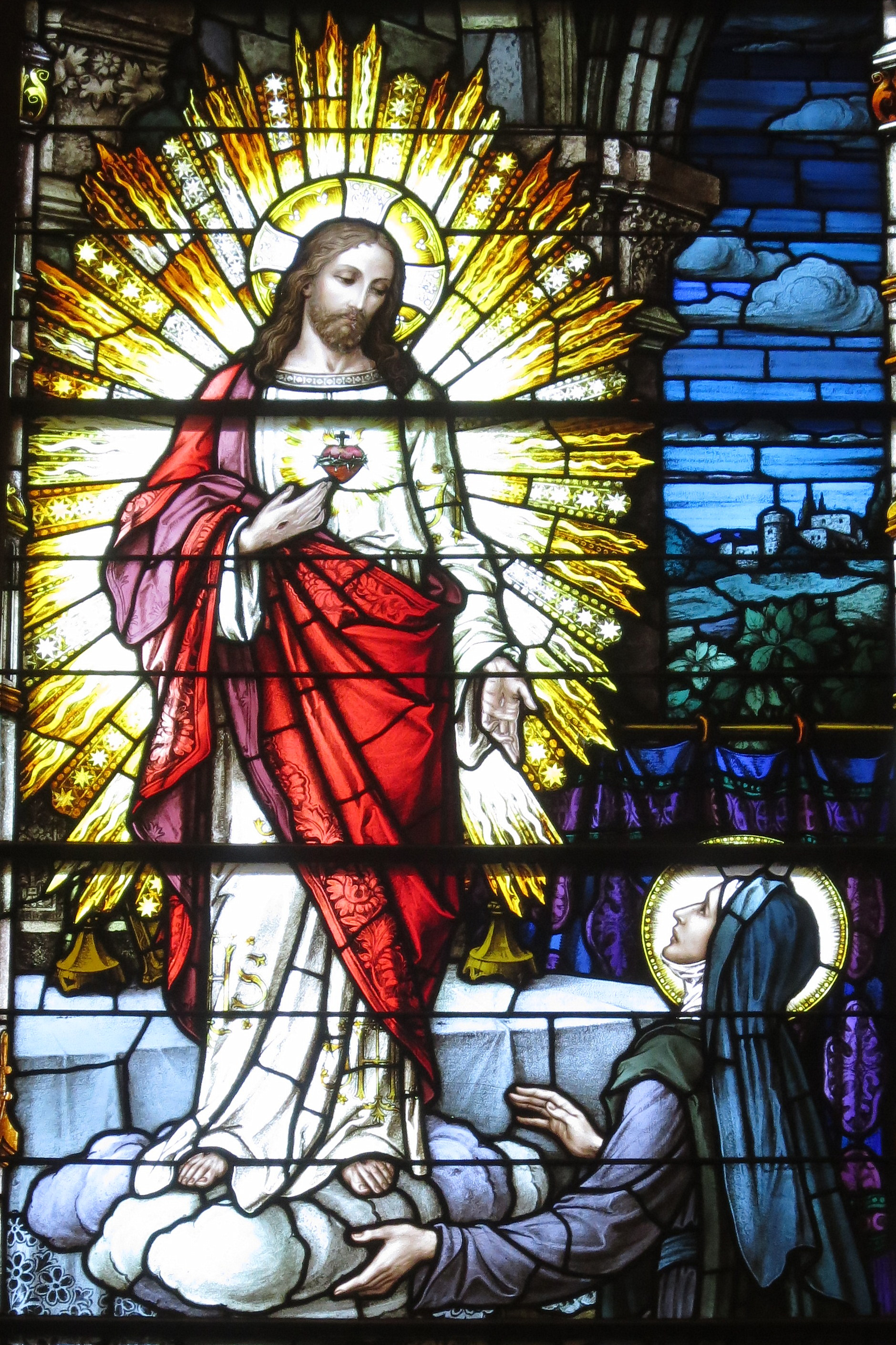
Stained glass at Saint Julie Billiart Catholic Church (Hamilton, Ohio)

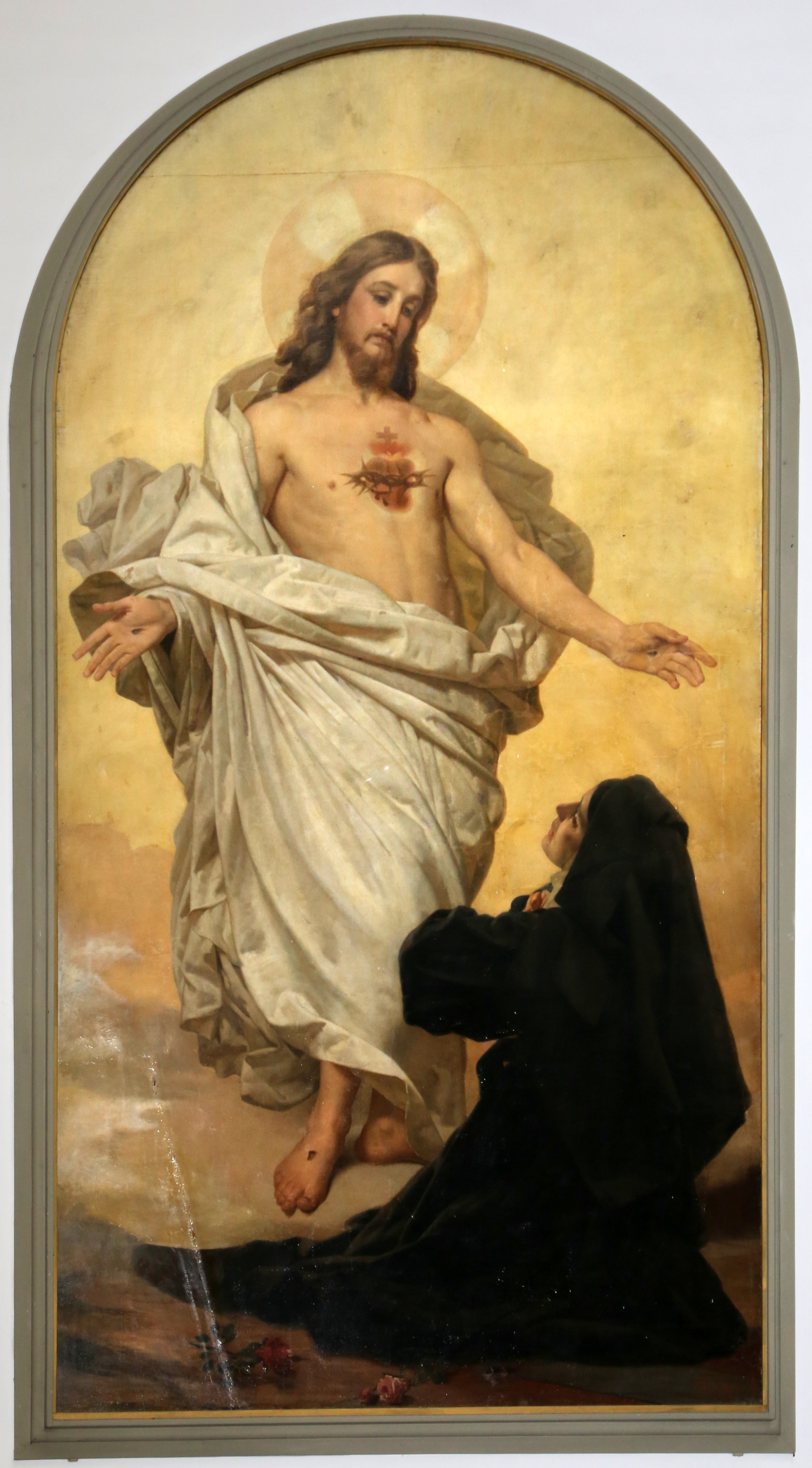
Apparition of the Sacred Heart to Santa Maria Alacoque by Antonio Ciseri, 1880

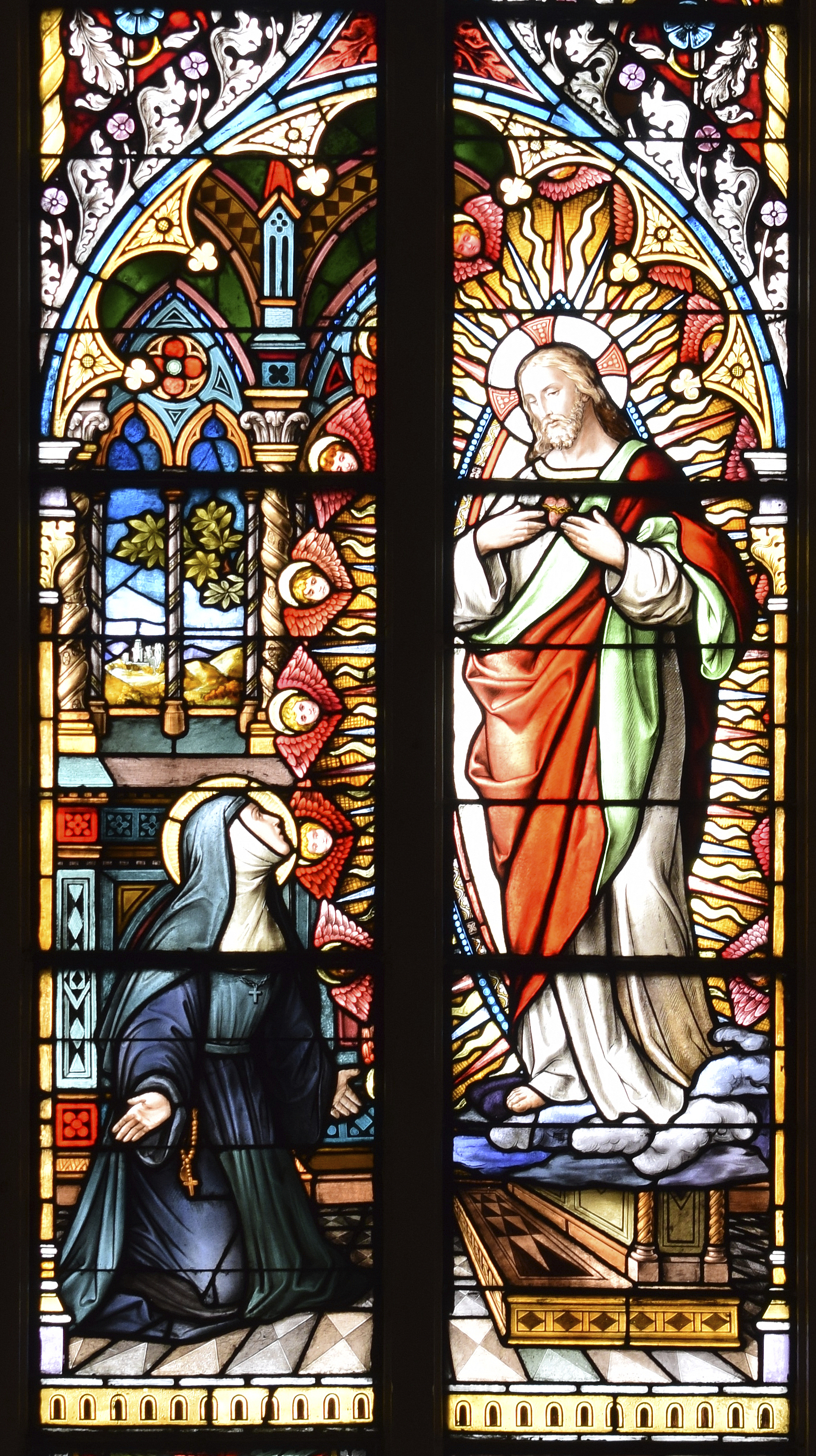
Stained glass at Saint Martin of Tours Church (Louisville, Kentucky)

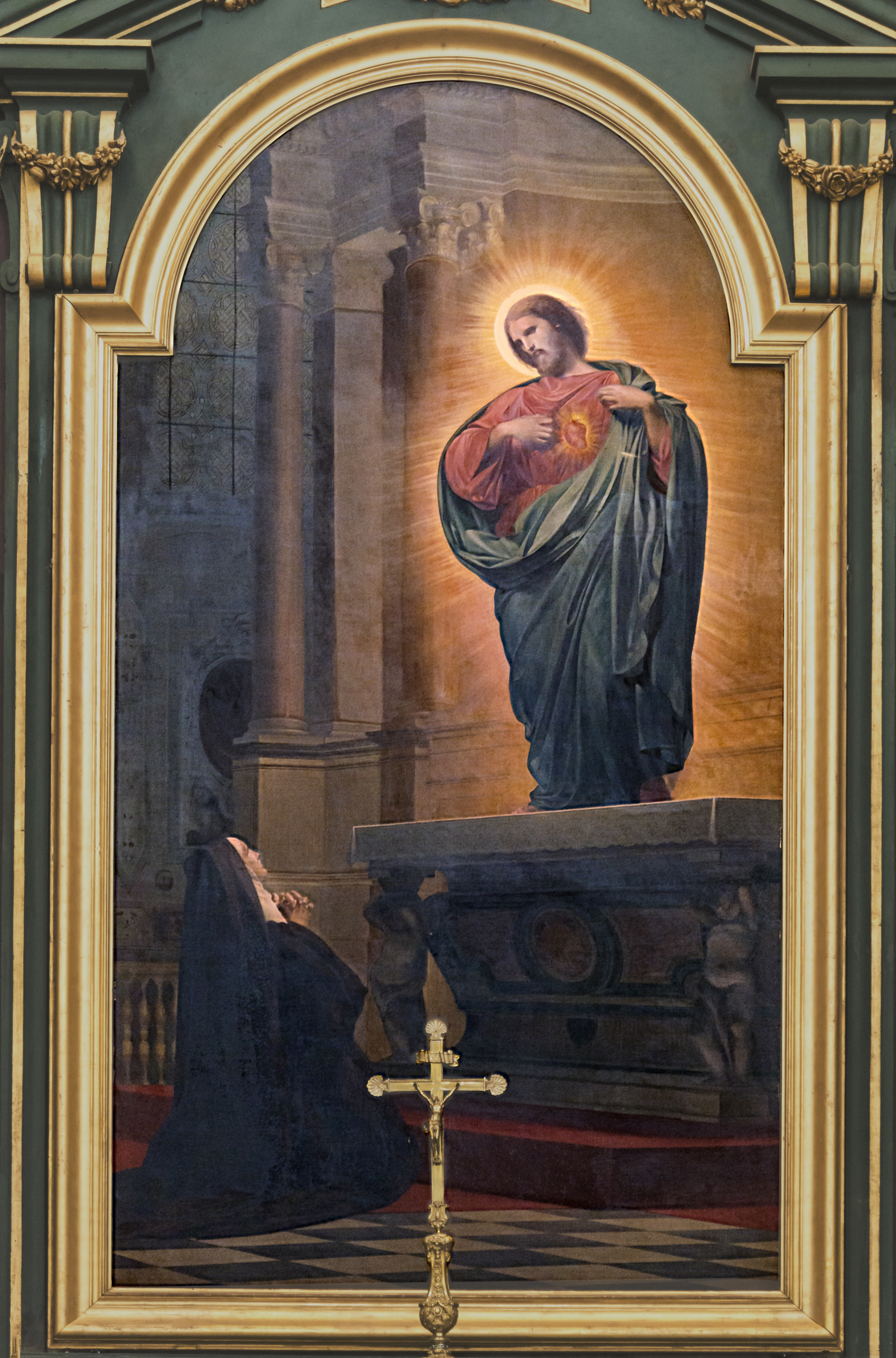
Vision of Margaret Mary Alacoque, nun of the Visitation by Armand Cambon, at Montauban Cathedral

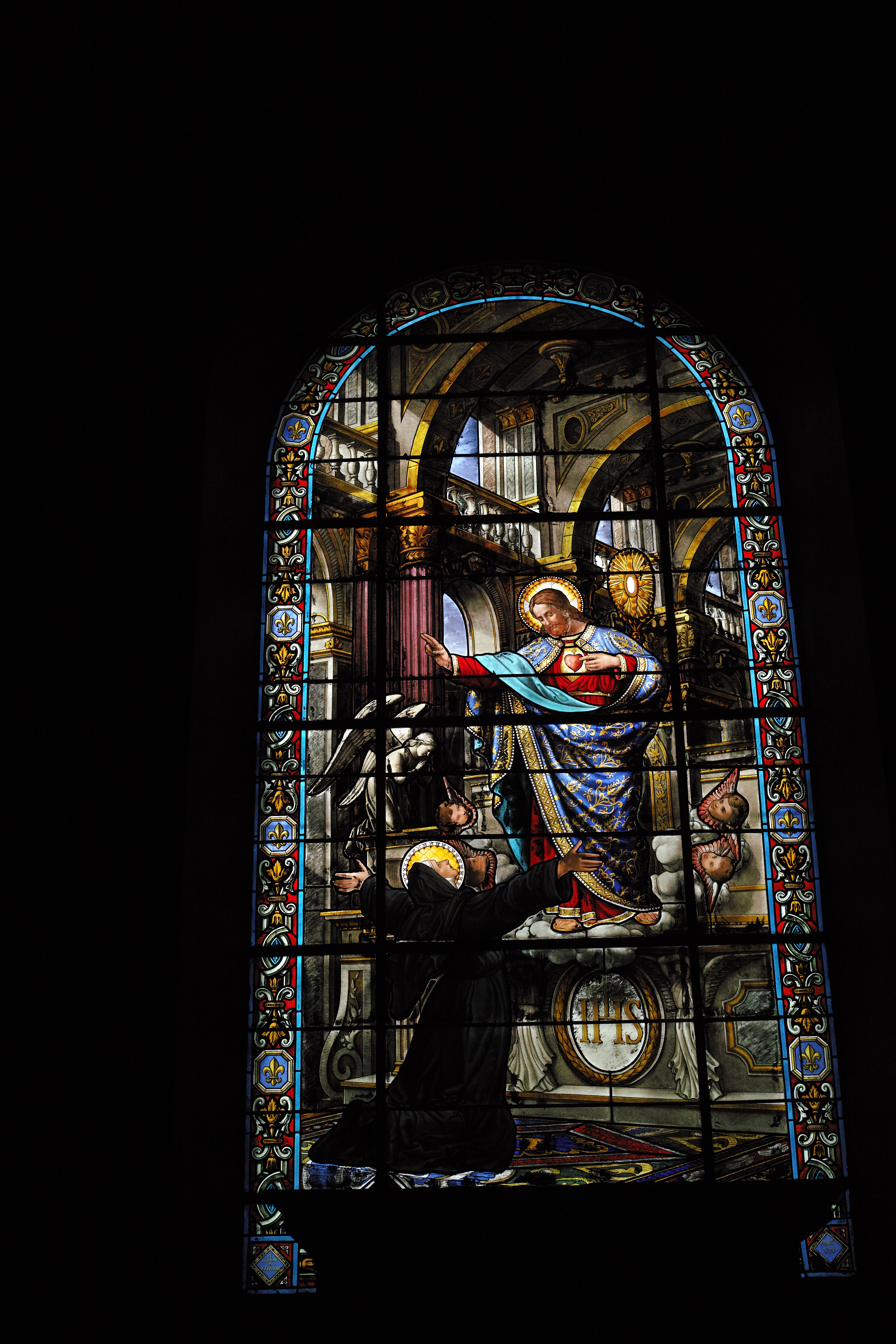
Stained glass at Église Saint-Germain de Saint-Germain-en-Laye

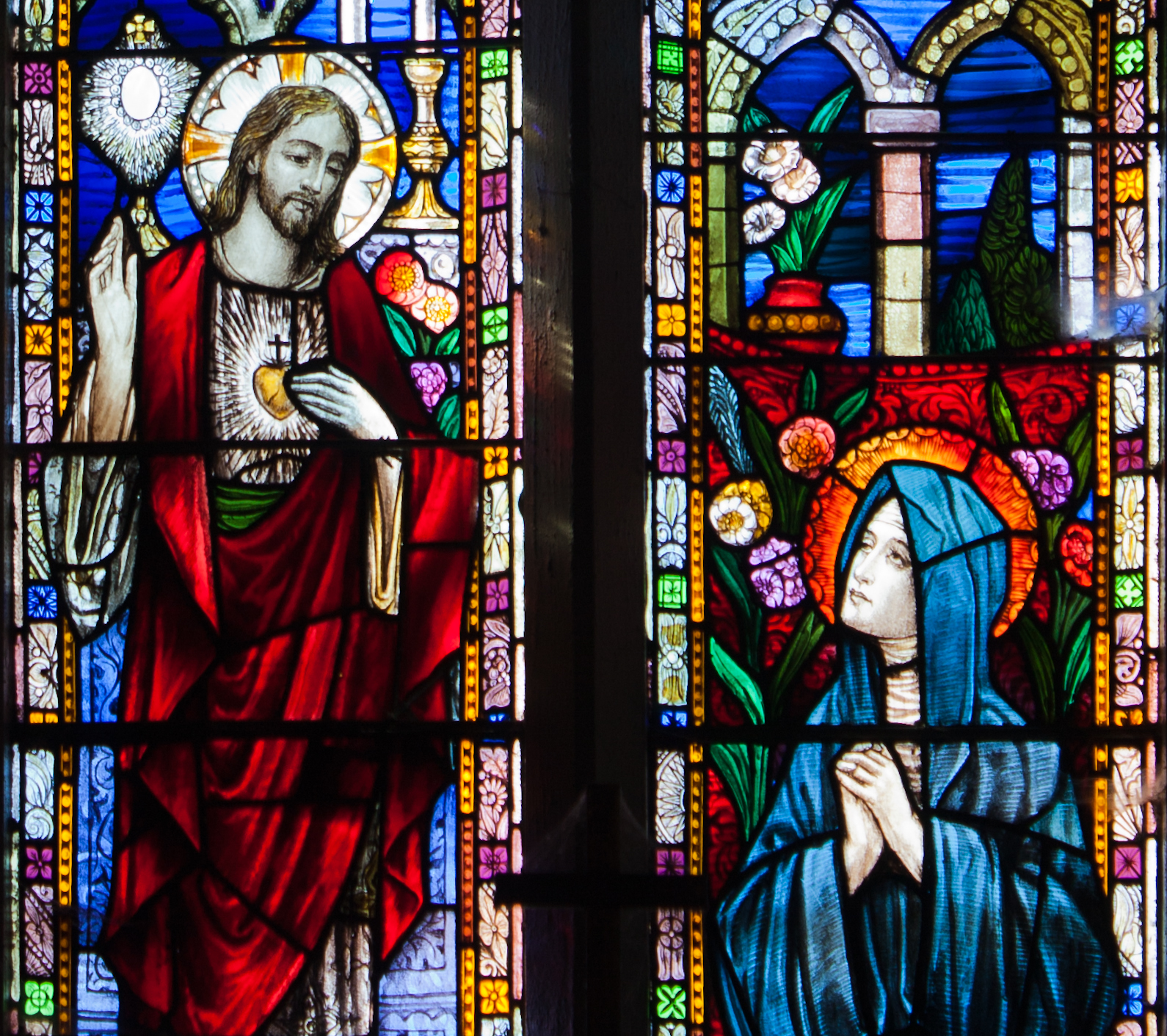
Stained glass at Ballylooby Church of Our Lady and St. Kieran, Ireland

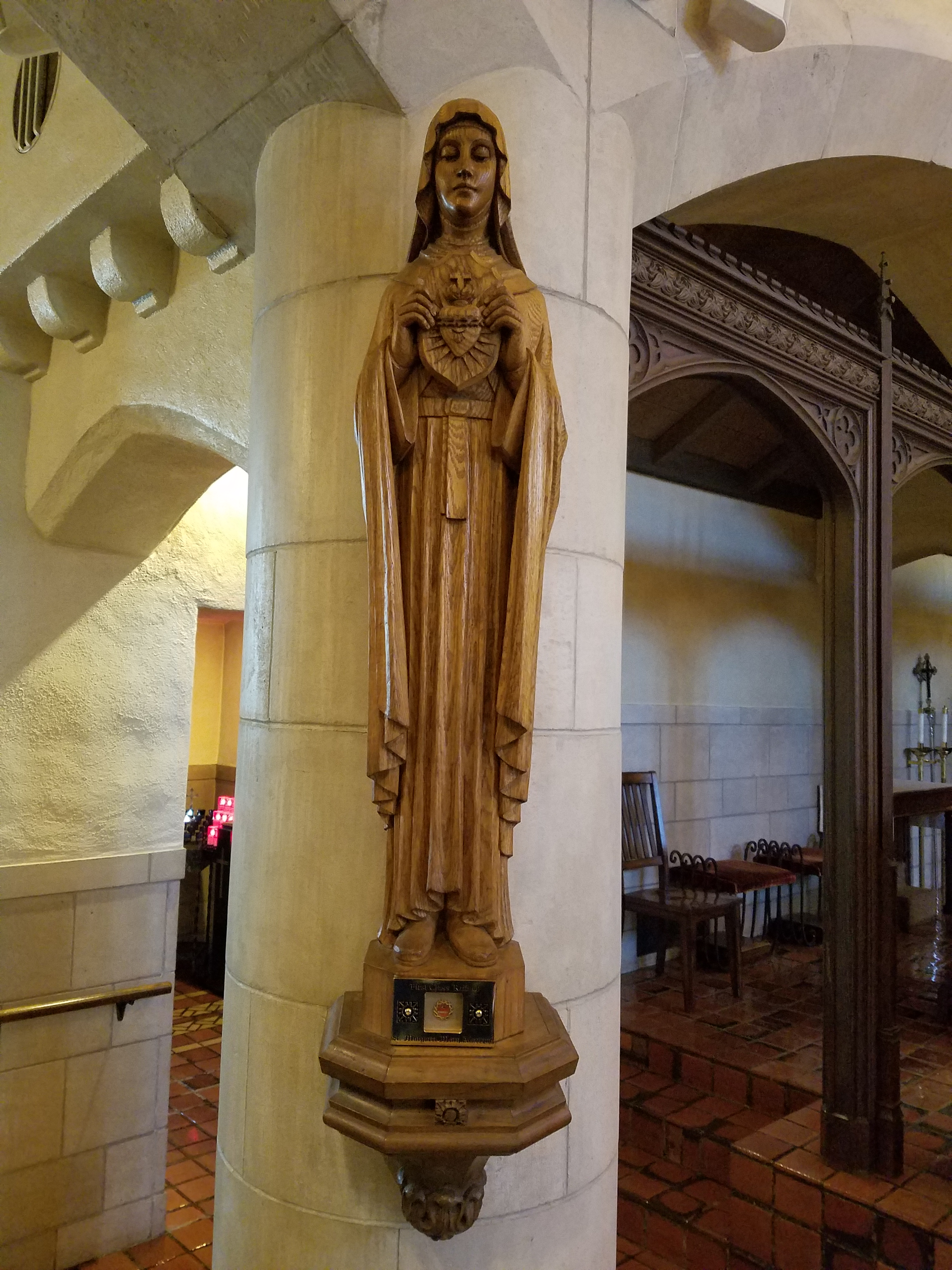
Sanctuary statue and first class relic at St. Margaret Mary Church (Omaha)

== See also ==
- Sacred Heart
- Act of Consecration to the Sacred Heart of Jesus
- First Fridays Devotion
