= Christ the King (disambiguation) =

Christ the King is a title of Jesus.

Christ the King may also refer to:

- Feast of Christ the King, observed in the Catholic Church, and many Protestant churches, since 1925

== Cathedrals and churches ==
- Christ the King Cathedral (disambiguation), the name of many church buildings around the world
- Christ the King Catholic Church in Kahului, Hawaii, United States
- Christ the King Chapel (Christendom College), Virginia, United States
- Christ the King Graceland Independent Anglican Church of Canada, Newmarket, Ontario, Canada
- Church of Christ the King, Bloomsbury, London, England
- Christ the King, Cockfosters, London, England: former priory now parish church and spirituality centre

== Schools ==
- Christ the King School (disambiguation)
- Christ the King (Georgetown, Ontario), a secondary school
- Christ the King Anglican College, Cobram, Victoria, Australia
- Christ the King Catholic Voluntary Academy, Arnold, Nottinghamshire, England
- Christ the King College, Sierra Leone, Africa
- Christ the King College, Isle of Wight, Isle of Wight, England
- Christ the King Seminary (East Aurora, New York)
- Christ the King Seminary, Philippines
- Christ the King Seminary (Pakistan)
- Christ the King Sixth Form College, Lewisham, England
- Seminary of Christ the King, British Columbia, Canada

== Other ==
- Anglican Diocese of Christ the King, in southern Africa
- Anglican Province of Christ the King, a part of the Continuing Anglican movement in the United States
- Christ the King Priory, a monastery of Missionary Benedictines in Schuyler, Nebraska, United States
- Christ the King Priory (Uganda), a monastery of Missionary Benedictines in Tororo, Uganda
- Community of Christ the King, an order of Anglican nuns
- Franciscan Missionaries of Christ the King, a Roman Catholic religious congregation
- Institute of Christ the King Sovereign Priest, an order of Catholic priests

== Statues ==
- Jesus Christ the King of the Universe, a statue in Świebodzin, Poland
- Cristo Rei of Dili
- Christ the King (Almada)
- Christ the King (Aherlow)
- Christ the King (Dún Laoghaire)
- Christ the King (Lubango)
- Christ the King (Madeira)
- Christ of Vũng Tàu, also known as Christ the King, of Vũng Tàu

== See also ==
- Cristo Rei (disambiguation), Portuguese translation of "Christ the King"
- Cristo Rey (disambiguation), Spanish translation of "Christ the King"
- King of the Jews (disambiguation)
