= Cristo Rei =

Cristo Rei (Portuguese, 'Christ the King') may refer to:

- Cristo Rei Administrative Post, Dili municipality, East Timor
  - Cristo Rei Beach
  - Cristo Rei of Dili, a statue
- Cristo Rei, Lubango, a statue in Angola
- Cristo Rei, Madeira, a statue in Caniço, Madeira
- Christ the King (Almada), a statue facing Lisbon, in Portugal

== See also ==
- Cristo Rey (disambiguation), the Spanish equivalent
- Christ the King (disambiguation)
