= Annum sacrum =

1899 encyclical on Christ's lordship

Annum sacrum Latin for 'A Holy Year' Encyclical of Pope Leo XIII
- Signature date: 25 May 1899
- Subject: Consecration to the Sacred Heart
- Number: 71 of 85 of the pontificate
- Text: In English

Annum sacrum (English: 'Holy Year') is an encyclical by Pope Leo XIII on the consecration of the whole human race to the Sacred Heart of Jesus. It was delivered in St. Peter's Basilica on 25 May 1899, in the twenty-second year of his pontificate.

== History ==
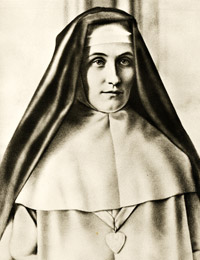
The Blessed Sister Mary of the Divine Heart was a nun from the Congregation of Our Lady of Charity of the Good Shepherd.

Annum sacrum was published on 25 May 1899, in anticipation of the Holy Year declared for 1900 to usher in the twentieth century.

When the Church, in the days immediately succeeding her institution, was oppressed beneath the yoke of the Caesars, a young Emperor saw in the heavens a cross, which became at once the happy omen and cause of the glorious victory that soon followed. And now, to-day, behold another blessed and heavenly tokenis offered to our sight-the most Sacred Heart of Jesus, with a cross rising from it and shining forth with dazzling splendor amidst flames of love. [...] there is in the Sacred Heart a symbol and a sensible image of the infinite love of Jesus Christ which moves us to love one another...

The consecration of the human race to the Sacred Heart of Jesus was a response to numerous demands that had been addressed to Pope Pius IX over 25 years. The encyclical, and the consecration, were influenced by two letters written to the pope by Sister Mary of the Divine Heart Droste zu Vischering who stated that in visions of Jesus Christ she had been told to request the consecration.

The motive of consecration is the need for the faithful to reciprocate God's love for His creation, especially for man.

The encyclical includes the Prayer of Consecration to the Sacred Heart of Jesus composed by Pope Leo XIII.

== Act of Consecration of the Human Race to the Sacred Heart of Jesus ==
The Act of Consecration of the Human Race to the Sacred Heart of Jesus is a Roman Catholic prayer composed by Pope Leo XIII and included in the encyclical, published in Acta Apostolicae Sedis, as he consecrated the entire world to the Sacred Heart of Jesus.

=== Words of the prayer ===
As ordered by Pope Pius XI, in the encyclical Quas primas (December 11, 1925) and published by the Sacred Congregation of Rites:

Most sweet Jesus, Redeemer of the human race, look down upon us humbly prostrate before Thy altar. We are Thine, and Thine we wish to be; but, to be more surely united with Thee, behold each one of us freely consecrates himself today to Thy most Sacred Heart. Many indeed have never known Thee; many too, despising Thy precepts, have rejected Thee. Have mercy on them all, most merciful Jesus, and draw them to Thy Sacred Heart.

Be Thou King, O Lord, not only of the faithful who have never forsaken Thee, but also of the prodigal children who have abandoned Thee; grant that they may quickly return to their Father's house lest they die of wretchedness and hunger.

Be Thou King of those who are deceived by erroneous opinions, or whom discord keeps aloof, and call them back to the harbor of truth and unity of faith, so that soon there may be but one flock and one Shepherd.

Be Thou King of all those who are still involved in the darkness of idolatry or of Islamism, and refuse not to draw them into the light and kingdom of God. Turn Thine eyes of mercy towards the children of the race, once Thy chosen people: of old they called down upon themselves the Blood of the Savior; may it now descend upon them a laver of redemption and of life.

Grant, O Lord, to Thy Church assurance of freedom and immunity from harm; give peace and order to all nations, and make the earth resound from pole to pole with one cry: Praise to the divine Heart that wrought our salvation; to It be glory and honor forever. Amen.

The consecration in the encyclical entered new theological territory by consecrating non-Christians.

His empire extends not only over Catholic nations and those who, having been duly washed in the waters of holy baptism, belong of right to the Church, although erroneous opinions keep them astray, or dissent from her teaching cuts them off from her care; it comprises also all those who are deprived of the Christian faith, so that the whole human race is most truly under the power of Jesus Christ. [...] Such an act of consecration, since it can establish or draw tighter the bonds which naturally connect public affairs with God, gives to States a hope of better things.

== Influence ==
According to Russell Hittinger, more subsequent encyclicals were written referencing Annum sacrum than the better known Rerum novarum.

Leo XIII unites the Kingship of Christ with devotion to the Sacred Heart. "For He who is the Only-begotten Son of God the Father, having the same substance with Him and being the brightness of His glory and the figure of His substance (Hebrews i., 3) necessarily has everything in common with the Father, and therefore sovereign power over all things." In addition to this natural right of sovereignty, he also acquired the right by his universally redemptive suffering and death.

Beginning with the encyclical, popes begin to speak more of Christ's ruling powers.

== Principles ==
- The whole human race is most truly under the power of Jesus Christ.(#3)

== See also ==
- Act of Consecration to the Sacred Heart of Jesus
- Act of Reparation to the Sacred Heart of Jesus
- List of encyclicals of Pope Leo XIII
- Ubi arcano Dei consilio

== Sources ==
- Pope Leo XIII (1899). "Annum sacrum". Libreria Editrice Vaticana.
- Ann Ball, 2003 Encyclopedia of Catholic Devotions and Practices ISBN 0-87973-910-X page 166
