= Feast of the Sacred Heart =

Solemnity in the Catholic Church

Solemnity of the Most Sacred Heart of Jesus
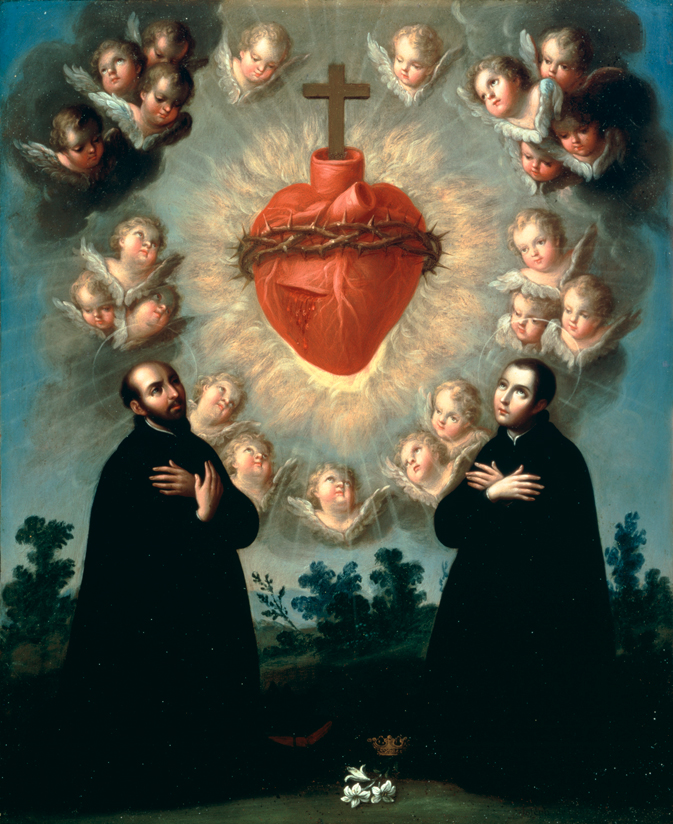
- 18th century depiction of Saint Ignatius of Loyola and Saint Louis Gonzaga with the Sacred Heart by José de Páez
- Observed by: Catholic Church; Western Rite Orthodoxy
- Date: Friday after the second Sunday after Pentecost (68 days after Easter)
- 2025 date: June 27
- 2026 date: June 12
- 2027 date: June 4
- 2028 date: June 23
- Related to: Sacred Heart Sunday

The Feast of the Sacred Heart is a solemnity in the liturgical calendar of the Roman Rite of the Catholic Church. According to the General Roman Calendar since 1969, it is formally known as the Solemnity of the Most Sacred Heart of Jesus (Latin: Sollemnitas Sacratissimi Cordis Iesu) and celebrated on the second Friday after Trinity Sunday. Some Anglican Franciscans keep the feast under the name of the Divine Compassion of Christ.

== History ==
The first liturgical feast of the Sacred Heart was celebrated, with episcopal approval, on 31 August 1670, in the major seminary of Rennes, France, through the efforts of John Eudes. The Mass and Office composed by Eudes were adopted elsewhere also, especially in connection with the spread of devotion to the Sacred Heart following on the reported revelations to Margaret Mary Alacoque and Mary of the Divine Heart.

In June 1675, according to Margaret Mary Alacoque of the Order of the Visitation of Holy Mary at Paray-le-Monial, France, she had a vision of Jesus Christ in which he asked her "that the first Friday after the octave of the Blessed Sacrament be dedicated to a particular feast to honor my heart, by receiving communion on that day and making reparation to it by honorable amends, to repair the indignities it received during the time it was exposed on the altars".

In 1726 Rome was again asked for a feast with a Mass and Office of its own; this was refused in 1729, but granted in 1765. In that year, at the request of the queen, the feast was received quasi-officially by the episcopate of France. A Mass of the Sacred Heart won papal approval for use in Poland and Portugal in 1765, and another was approved for Venice, Austria and Spain in 1788.

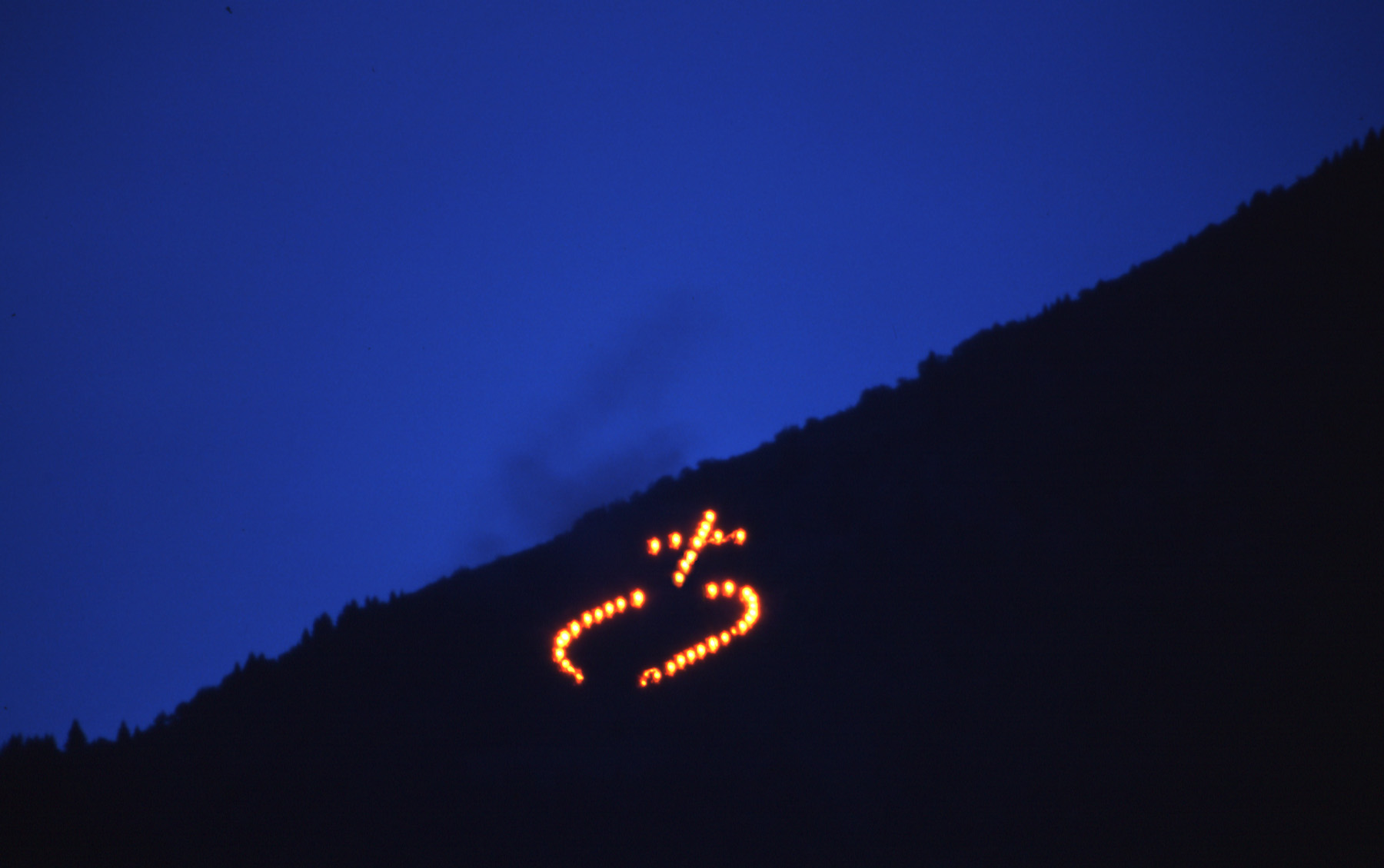
A traditional Herz-Jesu-Feuer ("Sacred Heart fire") on the slope of Mount Ifinger in South Tyrol, Italy, 2009.

In 1856, at the entreaties of the French bishops, Pope Pius IX extended the Feast of the Sacred Heart to the Latin Church under the rite of double major. It was to be celebrated on the Friday after the Octave of Corpus Christi. In June 1889, Leo XIII raised the feast to the dignity of the first class. In 1928, Pope Pius XI raised the feast to the highest rank, double of the first class, and added an octave; the 1955 reforms of the General Roman calendar suppressed, among others, the octave of the Sacred Heart of Jesus. With the liturgical changes in 1969, the feast was assigned the highest rank of solemnity.

The Mass prayers and readings approved on that occasion were replaced with new texts in 1929, and the lectionary published to accompany the 1970 Roman Missal provides three sets of readings, one for each year of the festive three-year liturgical cycle.

Priests may use this Mass, celebrated with white vestments, as a Votive Mass on other days also, especially on the first Friday of each month (unless falling on a day of higher rank). On this first Fridays it is also common to hold an Eucharistic adoration for a few hours (see First Friday devotion).

In Austria and South Tyrol, the so-called Sacred Heart Sunday, that is the Sunday after the Feast of the Sacred Heart, is also celebrated. Numerous processions take place on this day. Sacred Heart Fires are lit in the Bozen (Bolzano) area of Italy, among others.

Since 2002, the Solemnity of the Sacred Heart of Jesus is also a special day of prayer for the sanctification of priests. In 2009, the feast marked the beginning of a "Year for Priests".

The Feast of the Immaculate Heart of Mary immediately follows on Saturday.

== Date ==
The solemnity is celebrated on the second Friday following Trinity Sunday. The earliest possible date is May 29, as in 1818 and 2285. The latest possible date is July 2, as in 1943 and 2038. Therefore, it is the last feast date of the year dependent on the date of Easter.

In places where the Solemnity of the Most Holy Body and Blood of Christ is perpetually transferred from Thursday to Sunday (such as the United States and United Kingdom), it will appear on the local calendar as the Friday after the Solemnity of Corpus Christi.

== See also ==
- Prayer of Consecration to the Sacred Heart
