= Orientations for the Chinese Clergy =

Orientations for the Chinese Clergy is a June 28, 2019 document of the Holy See, published in full on the Feast of the Sacred Heart on the Vatican's official news site, that answers various questions – specifically, about conscience and conscientious objection – asked by the bishops of the Catholic Church in China, and that offers guidelines regarding the mandatory civil registration of religious leaders in China.

== See also ==
- Laogai
