= Christ the King College (disambiguation) =

Christ the King College is a secondary school in Sierra Leone.

Christ the King College may also refer to:

- Christ the King College, Isle of Wight, England
- Christ the King College, Jhansi, India
- Christ the King College, Onitsha, Nigeria
- Christ the King College (Gingoog), Philippines
- Christ the King College (La Union), Philippines

== See also ==
- Christ the King School (disambiguation)
