= Act of Consecration to the Sacred Heart of Jesus =

Prayer of Consecration to the Sacred Heart of Jesus

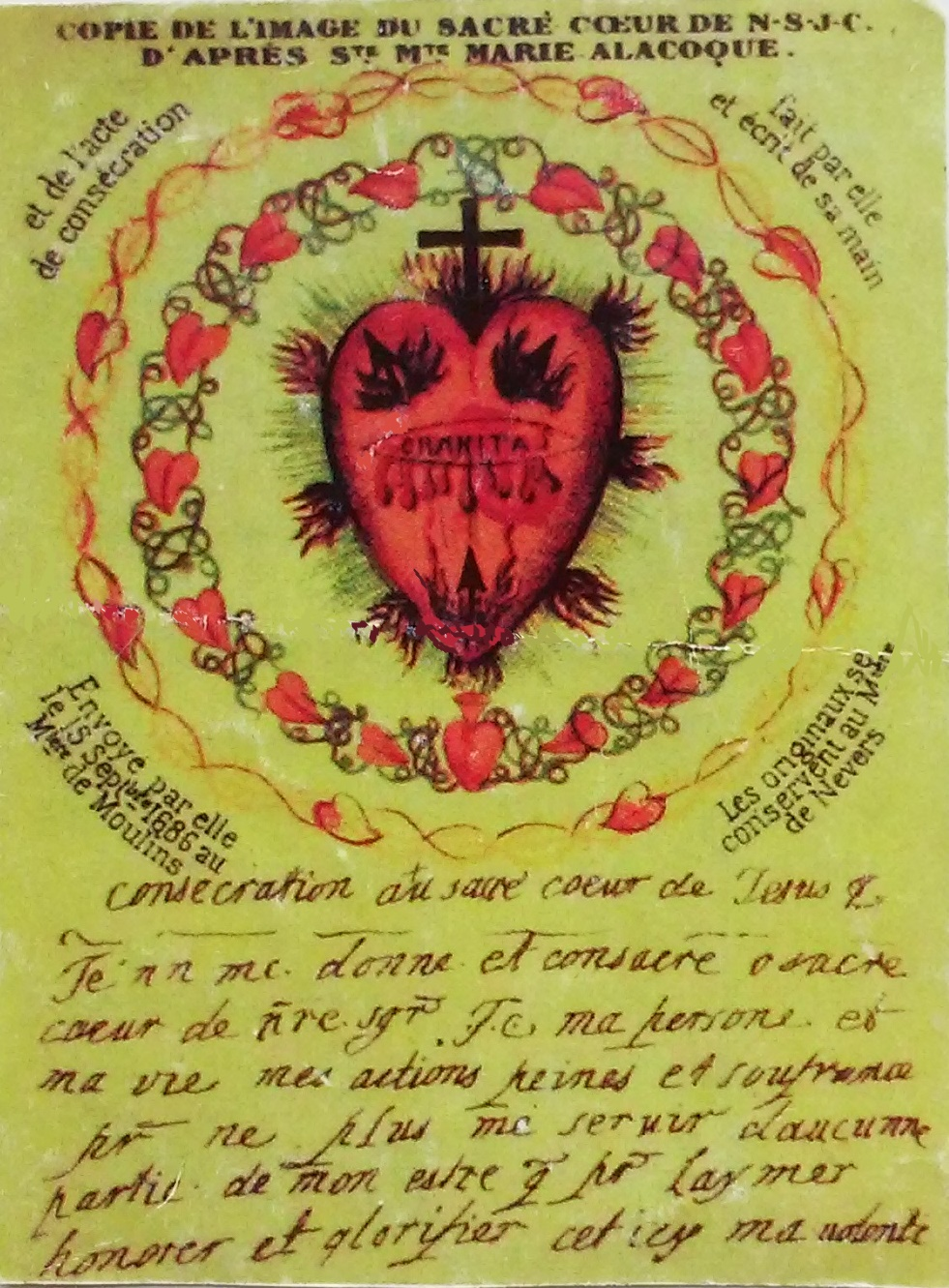
Copy of an image of the Sacred Heart (1686) and the Act of Consecration handwritten by Margaret Mary Alacoque

The Act of Consecration to the Sacred Heart of Jesus is a Christian prayer of consecration to the Sacred Heart of Jesus.

== History ==
The first personal prayer of consecration was written by Saint Margaret Mary Alacoque, who reportedly received Sacred Heart revelations from Jesus Christ between 1673 and 1675, in Paray-le-Monial, France. According to her, it was composed under the inspiration of Jesus, which she wrote to the Roman Catholic priest, John Croiset, recommending that he include it in the book he was to publish about her revelations "It comes from Him, and He would not agree to its omission." On 21 June 1675, the day of the first and future Feast of the Sacred Heart, Alacoque alleged that she received a vision of Jesus and made it known to her confessor Saint Claude La Colombière. Following that event, Claude consecrated himself to the Sacred Heart, making him the first person to be consecrated to the Sacred Heart of Jesus after Margaret Mary, and began spreading the devotion.

In April 1875, the Jesuit priest Henri Ramière presented a petition to Pope Pius IX along with the names of 534 Bishops and 23 superiors general of Religious institutes. The Pope approved and had the Sacred Congregation of Rites compose and publish an Act of Consecration to the Sacred Heart of Jesus. He then invited all the faithful to consecrate themselves on the 200th anniversary of Saint Margaret Mary Alacoque apparitions.

On 25 May 1899, Pope Leo XIII consecrated the human race and wrote an Act of Consecration of the Human Race to the Sacred Heart in his encyclical letter Annum sacrum. This consecration was made with the influence of Mary of the Divine Heart, which reportedly received the request from Jesus Christ, and in response to demands received over 25 years. This act was proclaimed in every church of the world on 11 June 1899 and is called the "great act" of his pontificate.

On 19 May 1908, a particular family consecration prayer known as the Act of Consecration of the Family to the Sacred Heart was approved and granted with an indulgence by Pope Pius X.

== The personal prayer ==
I, [name], give myself and consecrate to the Sacred Heart of our Lord Jesus Christ, my person and my life, my actions, pains and sufferings, so that I may be unwilling to make use of any part of my being other than to honor, love and glorify the Sacred Heart. This is my unchanging purpose, namely, to be all His, and to do all things for the love of Him, at the same time renouncing with all my heart whatever is displeasing to Him. I therefore take You, O Sacred heart, to be the only object of my love, the guardian of my life, my assurance of salvation, the remedy of my weakness and inconstancy, the atonement for all the faults of my life and my sure refuge at the hour of death. Be then, O Heart of goodness, my justification before God the Father, and turn away from me the strokes of his righteous anger. O Heart of love, I put all my confidence in You, for I fear everything from my own wickedness and frailty, but I hope for all things from Your goodness and bounty. Remove from me all that can displease You or resist Your holy will; let your pure love imprint Your image so deeply upon my heart, that I shall never be able to forget You or to be separated from You. May I obtain from all Your loving kindness the grace of having my name written in Your Heart, for in You I desire to place all my happiness and glory, living and dying in bondage to You. Amen.

== Consecration of locations and regions ==
=== Ecuador ===
On 25 March 1874, Ecuador became the first country to be consecrated to the Sacred Heart of Jesus in a joint action of the president Gabriel García Moreno and Archbishop José Ignacio Checa y Barba. The national consecration took place in the cathedral of Quito, located next to the government palace. Prior to the consecration, in 1873, an assembly of 700 religious, including bishops and priests gathered to make an ecclesiastical decree. This was approved by the Senate and the Chamber of Deputies that same year. On 24 October 1874, the official registry of this legislative decree was published. As a remembrance of Ecuador's consecration to the Sacred Heart of Jesus, the construction of the Basilica del Voto Nacional began in Quito in 1887.

On 25 March 2024, Ecuador renewed its Consecration to the Sacred Heart of Jesus on the 150th anniversary of the national consecration presided over by the Archbishop of Quito and Primate of Ecuador Alfredo José Espinosa Mateus. The liturgical act was held in the Basilica del Voto Nacional.

=== Colombia ===
On 22 June 1902, the Republic of Colombia was consecrated by decree to the Sacred Heart of Jesus at the initiative of the Archbishop of Bogota Bernardo Herrera Restrepo. As a plea for the end of the "Thousand Days War" which had broken out in 1899, the Archbishop asked the president José Manuel Marroquín to turn the nation to the Sacred Heart in order to unite Colombians. José Manuel Marroquín agreed and the construction of the Voto Nacional church in Bogota, located in the locality of Los Martires, was also ordered. Five months after the Consecration, on 21 November 1902, the Treaty of Wisconsin was signed and the war came to an end. In 1964, the parish was elevated by Pope Paul VI to a Minor Basilica and was declared a national monument 1975.

On 24 June 2022, the Consecration of families, communities and the whole nation to the Sacred Heart of Jesus was renewed in the Primate Cathedral of Bogota by the Archbishop of Bogota and President of the Episcopal Conference of Colombia Luis José Rueda Aparicio. The following year, on 16 June 2023, the Consecration was once again renewed in the Cathedral of Bogota by the Archbishop Luis José Rueda Aparicio.

=== Mexico ===
On 11 January 1914, Mexico was consecrated to the Sacred Heart of Jesus Christ in Mexico City. At the time, the country was in the midst of a Revolutionary War and Mexico had less than 20 million inhabitants, 98 percent of whom declared themselves Catholics.

Ten years later, on 11 October 1924, Mexican bishops renewed the consecration in the Metropolitan Cathedral of Mexico City during a time of religious persecution against Catholics and during the first Mexican Eucharistic Congress.

On 23 June 2023, on the occasion of the visit of the relics of Saint Margaret Mary Alacoque, Mexico's consecration was renewed during a ceremony presided over by the Bishop of León Monsignor José Guadalupe Martín Rábago. A special message sent by Pope Benedict XVI through Cardinal Secretary of State Angelo Sodano was also read during the ceremony.

In 2013, Mexico's consecration to the Sacred Heart of Jesus was renewed by the Church and lay organizations.

At the request of a group of lay people, Cardinal Carlos Aguiar Retes, Archbishop Primate of Mexico, renewed the consecration of Mexico to the Sacred Heart of Jesus on 26 May 2024 as he considered it "convenient at this moment in the country's history". The act took place in the Basilica of Our Lady of Guadalupe in Mexico City during the Solemnity of the Most Holy Trinity.

=== Spain ===
In 1733, during Eucharistic adoration, the Jesuit Blessed Bernardo de Hoyos reportedly received revelations of the Sacred Heart, telling him: "I will reign in Spain and with more veneration than elsewhere". This is the phrase known in Spain as the 'Great Prayer'. After the revelations of Hoyos in Valladolid, devotion to the Sacred Heart of Jesus started spreading throughout Spain.

The year 1911 is sometimes referred to as the earliest date of when the idea of consecrating Spain to the Sacred Heart emerged among Spanish people. Later with the development of World War I and the arrival of Benedict XV to the pontificate, that idea gained popularity, with the aim that it could bring peace to the world and having in mind the recommendation made by Pope Leo XIII in 1900.

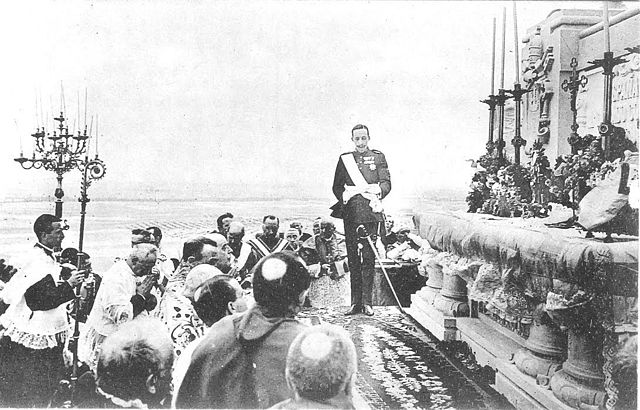
King Alfonso XIII consecrating Spain to the Sacred Heart in 1919

Spain was officially consecrated to the Sacred Heart on 30 May 1919, a solemn act that was attended by the priest Mateo Crawley-Boevey, the Nuncio to Spain Francesco Ragonesi, the bishops, King Alfonso XIII and the government. The idea of consecrating Spain to the Heart of Jesus, as other countries had already done, emerged through an "initiative of lay people". Before the final blessing, a telegram from Pope Benedict XV was read. The Nuncio imparted the Papal Blessing and then the Blessed Sacrament was solemnly exposed. Then, King Alfonso XIII read the prayer of consecration to the Sacred Heart of Jesus written by Mateo Crawley-Boevey in remembrance of the promise made by Jesus Christ to Blessed Bernardo de Hoyos : "I will reign in Spain". In conjunction with the consecration, a whole movement linked to the Social Reign of Christ and devotion to the Sacred Heart of Jesus was born in Spain. The consecration took place at the Cerro de los Angeles in front of the monument built a few years before, which would later be destroyed by the Republican militias during the Civil War.

In 1936, the Spanish Civil War began, during which the monument was destroyed. Five young men were killed for defending the monument from attacks of the Republican militiamen. Five days later, the militiamen shot the image and made several other attacks, but due to the hardness of the material, they had to destroy it using dynamite, leaving only a few remains that are still there to this day. After the war, the Franco regime built the monument back in imitation of the previous one though a little bigger. It was inaugurated in 1965. In 1975, a sanctuary was built at the foot of the monument.

On 30 June 2019, the Spanish Church renewed the Consecration of Spain to the Sacred Heart, during a ceremony held on the esplanade of the Sanctuary of the Cerro de Los Angeles, at the foot of the monument as it was done in 1919. The ceremony was attended by four cardinals and more than twenty archbishops and bishops, as well as more than 12,000 people. The bishop of Getafe Carlos Osoro hosted the ceremony, with the presence of the former Pope Francis' Nuncio to Spain, Renzo Fratini, who conveyed the Pope's blessing.

In Spain, at least 326 monuments to the Sacred Heart have been erected in public and open places. We also find images of the Sacred Heart in thousands of churches and on many tiles displayed in various municipalities.

=== Poland ===
On 27 July 1920, amid the Bolshevik threat, Cardinal Edmund Dalbor and Polish bishops gathered at Jasna Góra and consecrated the Polish nation and homeland to the Sacred Heart of Jesus. Three weeks later, Poland defeated the Red Army during the Battle of Warsaw, also known as the "Miracle on the Vistula". Pope Benedict XV praised the bishops for their consecration of the country to the Sacred Heart.

In 1921, the consecration of Poland was renewed in the Basilica of the Sacred Heart of Jesus in Kraków, a new church erected and consecrated to the Sacred Heart as a votive offering of gratitude for the regained independence after the war.

The consecration of Poland was since then renewed in 1951, 1976, 2011 and 2021. The last renewal act was performed on 11 June 2021 for the 100th anniversary of the first act by Archbishop Stanislaw Gądecki and Polish bishops in the Basilica of the Sacred Heart of Jesus in Kraków.

=== Costa Rica ===
On November 4, 1921, the Archbishop Rafael Otón Castro Jiménez, then Archbishop of San José, consecrated the Archdiocese of San José, which covered almost the entire country at that time.

=== Bolivia ===
Bolivia was consecrated to the Sacred Heart of Jesus on 7 August 1925.

On 15 April 2018, in the Cathedral of Cochabamba, Bolivian bishops renewed the consecration to the Sacred Hearts of Jesus and Mary, as part of a celebration of the upcoming canonization of Saint Nazaria Ignacia March Mesa, as well as other important milestones for the Church in the country. The request of the renewal was made to the bishops by presidents of Councils of the Laity and at the initiative of lay people, as stated the president of the National Council of the Laity of Bolivia Richard Romero.

=== Brazil ===
Brazil was consecrated to the Sacred Heart of Jesus in 1931 by the Cardinal Sebastião Leme, at the inauguration of the Christ the Redeemer statue, on the Corcovado mountain in Rio de Janeiro.

On 12 April 2020, during Easter Sunday, the Archbishop of Rio de Janeiro and Cardinal Orani João Tempesta renewed the act of consecration of Brazil to the Sacred Heart of Jesus at the foot of the Christ the Redeemer monument.

=== Honduras ===
Honduras was consecrated to both the Sacred Heart of Jesus and Mary on 16 August 1959. On this occasion, Pope John XXIII transmitted a radio message to the Honduran Catholics present at the ceremony.

=== Argentina ===
On 28 October 1945, Argentina was consecrated to the Sacred Heart of Jesus during a ceremony held in Buenos Aires, during which Pope Pius XII addressed a radio message.

For the 202nd anniversary of the Declaration of Independence of Argentina, on 9 July 2018, the Chief of Government of the city of Buenos Aires, Horacio Rodríguez Larreta, consecrated his life, his administration and the city of Buenos Aires to the Sacred Heart of Jesus in the Metropolitan Cathedral.

=== Peru ===
The President of Peru Pedro Pablo Kuczynski attended a National Prayer Breakfast on 16 October 2016, accompanied by the first lady and other politicians such as the President of Congress Luz Salgado, where he consecrated Peru and his family to the Sacred Heart of Jesus through a formal prayer and a religious ceremony.

=== Syria ===
On 29 September 2017, several Eastern Catholic Churches including Maronite, Melkite, Syriac and Armenian Catholics have jointly consecrated Syria to the hearts of Jesus and Mary in a joint effort to "bring lasting peace to the war-torn land". Bishop Elias Sleman led the celebrations in Damascus with Maronite Bishop Samir Nassar of Damascus. The formal act of consecration was followed with prayer ceremonies which were held across the country, including in Damascus, Aleppo, Homs, Latakia, Tartous and Haba. Orthodox Christians also joined in the prayer ceremonies.

=== Turkey ===
The Catholic Church in Turkey was consecrated to the Sacred Heart of Jesus Christ on 7 June 2024 in the Cathedral of Saint John in Izmir, with the presence of the Apostolic Nuncio to Turkey Monsignor Marek Solczynski and his Advisor Alessandro Ambrino. Archbishops of the 4 Catholic denominations in Turkey were present during the consecration, along with Father James Paxton of the Anglican Church.

=== Fátima's 24 countries consecration ===
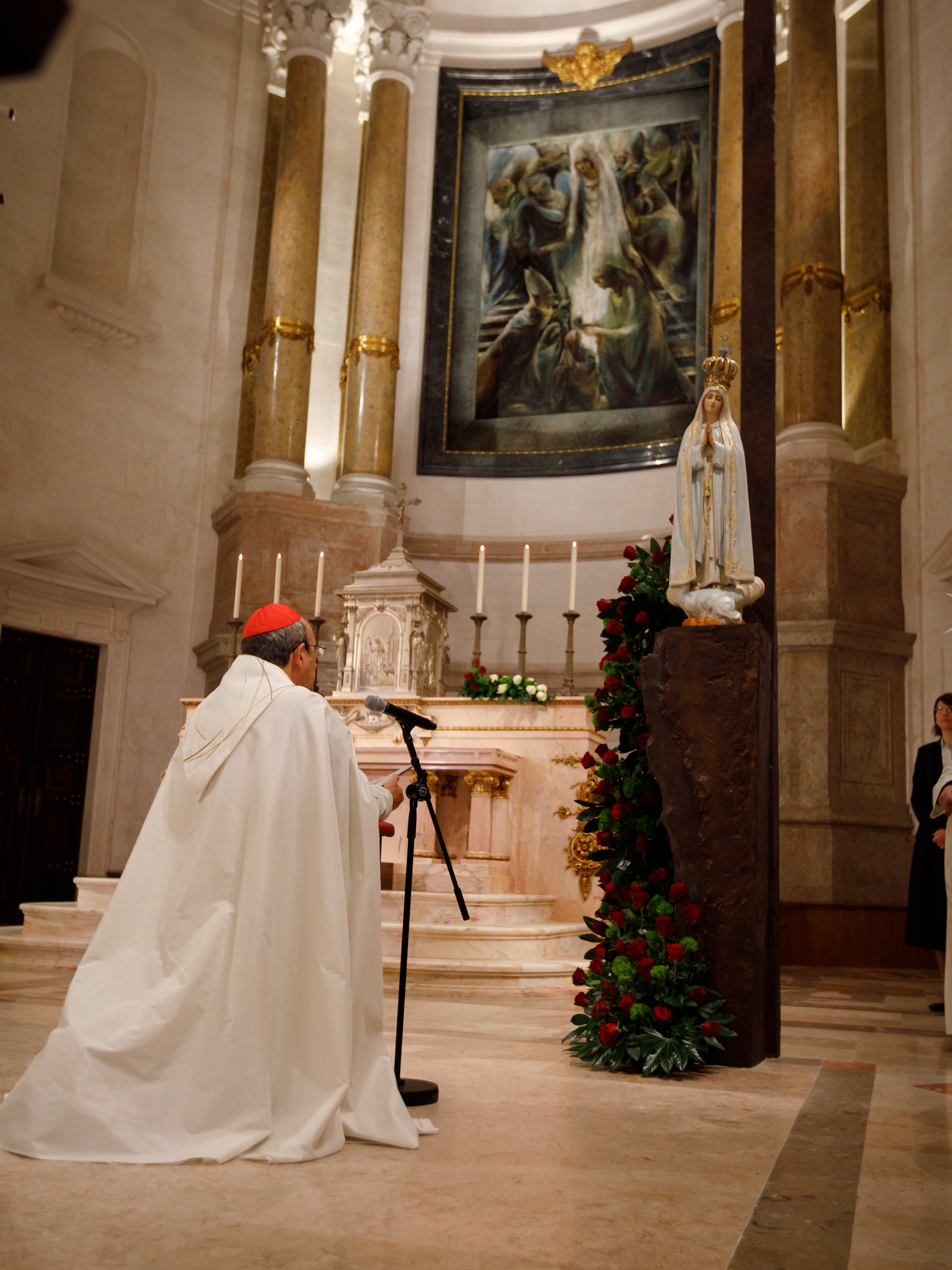
Consecration of Portugal, Spain and 22 other countries by Cardinal António Marto on March 25, 2020, in Fátima.

On 25 March 2020, during the global pandemic of COVID-19, Cardinal Antonio Marto renewed the consecration of Portugal and Spain to the Hearts of Jesus and Mary, and added the names of 22 other countries, some of which were consecrated for the first time. The act of consecration took place in the Sanctuary of Our Lady of Fátima in Fátima. The Portuguese bishops invited the heads of other national bishops' conferences to request that their nations be added to the list. In addition to Spain and Portugal, the other 22 countries consecrated at the request of their respective episcopal conferences were: Albania, Bolivia, Colombia, Costa Rica, Cuba, Slovakia, Guatemala, Hungary, India, Mexico, Moldova, Nicaragua, Panama, Paraguay, Peru, Poland, Kenya, the Dominican Republic, Romania, Tanzania, East Timor and Zimbabwe.

=== United States of America ===
On June 11, 2026, on occasion of the 250th anniversary of the Declaration of Independence, U.S. bishops formally consecrated the nation to the Sacred Heart of Jesus.
