= Christ the King (Dún Laoghaire) =

Bronze monument in Dún Laoghaire, Ireland

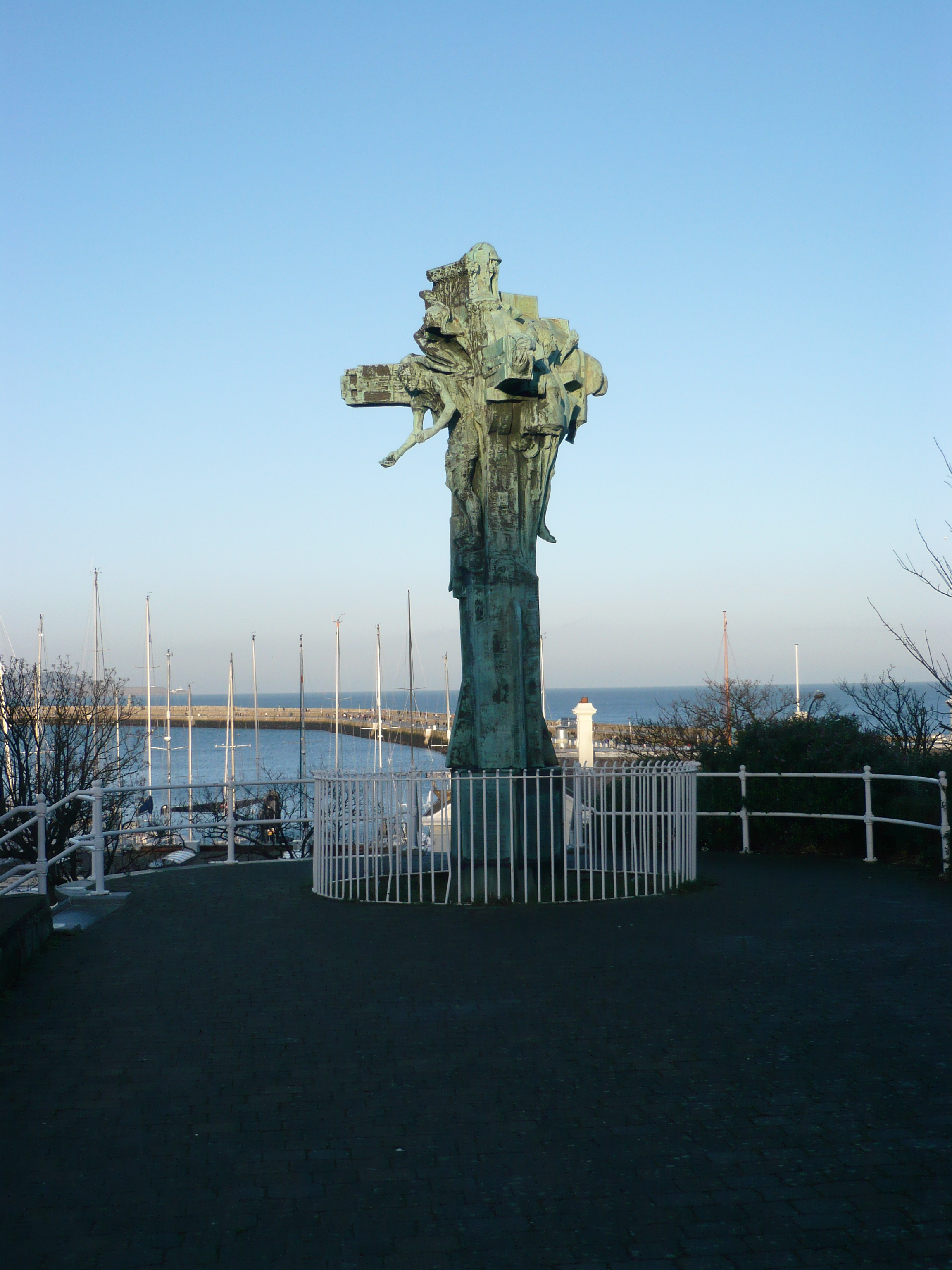
- Christ the King in 2009
- Artist: Andrew O'Connor
- Year: 16 December 1978 (47 years ago)
- Type: Bronze
- Dimensions: 5.5 m (18 ft)
- Location: Dún Laoghaire, Ireland

Christ the King is a bronze sculpture by the American-Irish sculptor Andrew O'Connor. It is located in Moran Park, Dún Laoghaire, Ireland. It is officially known as the Monument of Christ the King.

== History ==
Andrew O'Connor originally conceived and designed the work in 1925. It was originally intended as a memorial to the dead of World War I. It was first exhibited in plaster form at the Paris Salon in 1926, where O'Connor won an award for it.

At a meeting in Dún Laoghaire Town Hall on 9 June 1931, a committee was formed with a plan to erect a statue of Christ the King near the Dún Laoghaire seafront. The committee acquired O'Connor's piece with the intention of erecting the monument following the 1932 Eucharistic Congress that was held in Dublin.

During the 1930s, the bronze was cast by the Rudier Foundry in Paris. The outbreak of World War II delayed delivery to Ireland, and it was hidden during the war for fear that it might be melted down. It was finally transported to Ireland in 1949.

On arrival in Ireland, opinion on the artistic merits of the statue were divided. There was opposition from the local parish priest and also from John Charles McQuaid, the Catholic Archbishop of Dublin. McQuaid refused permission for it to be erected, and it was transported to the Archbishop's House in Drumcondra for "examination". It was later returned to Dún Laoghaire, and for some years it lay in the People's Park, Dún Laoghaire. Later it was moved to the back garden of one of the committee members, Edward Kenny, and remained there for nearly 30 years.

In 1976, the Borough of Dún Laoghaire approved the committee's proposal for the erection of the statute in Dún Laoghaire. On 16 December 1978, it was finally erected on Haigh Terrace, overlooking the sea.

In 2012, the statue was removed from Haigh Terrace to facilitate construction of the dlr LexIcon library. The statue was restored, and in 2014 it was relocated to the western end of Moran Park, overlooking Dún Laoghaire harbour.

In 2015, Jeremy Kenny, the grandson of original committee member, Edward Kenny, donated an archive of material relating to the statue to dlr LexIcon.

== Statue ==
The monument is a three-sided sculpture which depicts three aspects of Jesus: Christ crucified, Christ the consoler and Christ resurrected. It was originally known as the Triple Cross. Dáithi Hanly designed the hexagonal base, and it features plaques providing a history of the monument in various languages, and one containing the names of the committee members.

This text is from one of the plaques on the base of the monument.

Christ the King

This Triple Cross, designed by Andrew O'Connor,
an American sculptor of Irish descent, was
first exhibited at the Paris Salon of 1926.
On 9th June 1931, a public meeting was held
which agreed to erect a monument to Christ
the King in Dun Laoghaire. Trustees and a
committee were appointed and subscriptions
came from persons of all religious
denominations. It was decided in 1949 that this
sculpture, which had been cast in bronze
before the war, was eminently suitable.

In June 1976, the council of the Borough
of Dun Laoghaire agreed to the siting of
the monument in this location, and it was
erected here on 16th December 1978.

The tripartite monument symbolizes three
distinct aspects of Christ's life:
Desolation – the crucifixion under a darkening cloud;
Consolation – Christ resurrected, completely
restored, even youthful, with arms
outstretched to console all mankind;
Triumph – Christ the King in majesty,
emerging from the tomb.
