= Sacred Heart of Jesus Fire =

Fire rite on Tyrol and Trentino hillsides

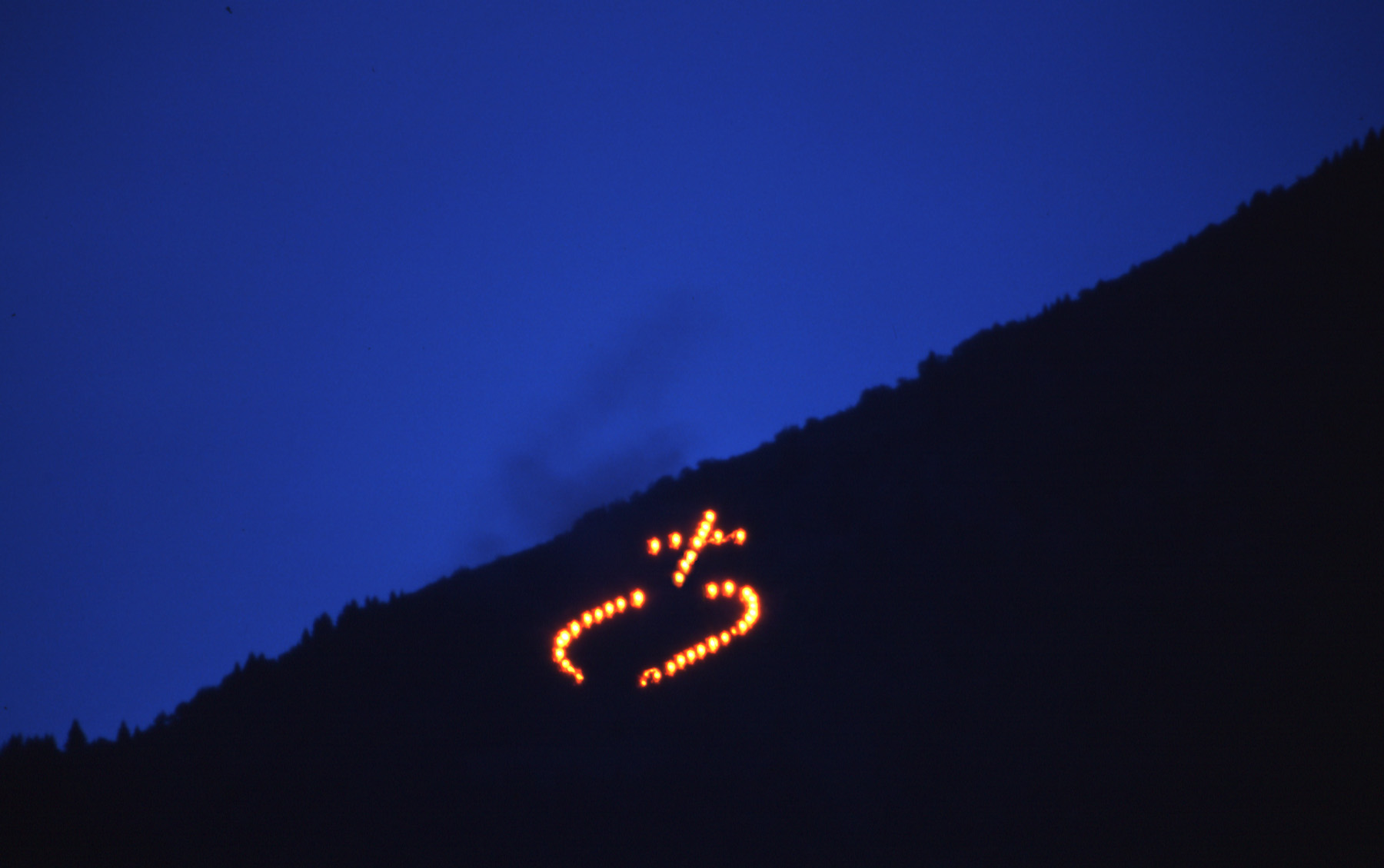
Sacred Heart of Jesus Fire on the Ifinger mountain

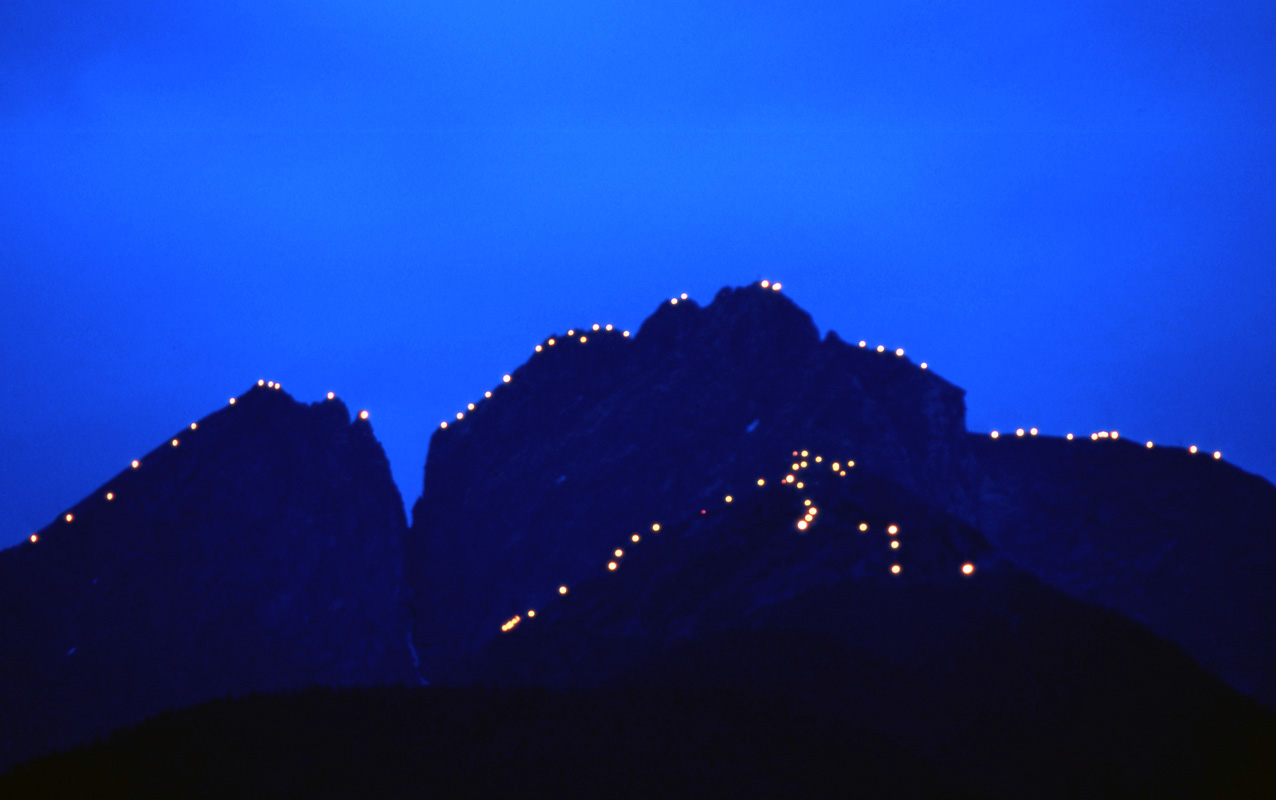
Sacred Heart of Jesus Fire on the ridge of the Ifinger mountain

The Sacred Heart Fires are a fire rite that originated in Tyrol in the 18th century. They are lit either on the Saturday or Sunday after the Feast of the Sacred Heart, as this feast is celebrated in Tyrol on the Sunday after the feast of the Sacred Heart of Jesus that always falls on a Friday.

The fires are lit in several parts of the Tyrol and Trentino. The custom of lighting a fire in June goes back to the earlier solstice of St. John's fires, which were reinterpreted in memory of a vow to the Sacred Heart of Jesus in 1796.

== Historical background ==
In the spring of 1796, the Napoleonic Wars hit Tyrol completely unexpected and it was therefore unprepared. The country had remained untouched by hostile actions during the previous years during which the Holy Roman Emperor fought against the French in Belgium and northern Italy. The Tyroleans had the privilege, which Emperor Maximilian I established in the 16th century in the "Landlibell" (charter that regulates the organization of the Tyrolean military), neither to have to take part in wars outside the country, nor to support these wars financially. In return, however, the Tyroleans had to defend their country themselves. This fact was always a thorn in the side of the government in Vienna and because of this, Emperor Joseph II neglected both the annual exercises and armament in Tyrol.

The province of Tyrol mobilized for war in April 1796. This meant that all men fit to carry weapons were trained for the military. After only three weeks, an army of 7,000 men was sent to Tyrol's southern borders. From 30 May to 1 July of the same year, the smaller, 24-member Committee of Tyrolean Estates met in Bozen to discuss of the situation. It was the idea of the pastor of Wildermieming, Anton Paufler, that abbot Sebastian Stöckl of Stamser took up and proposed to the Tyrolean parliament to entrust the land to the Sacred Heart of Jesus and thus to receive divine assistance. This proposal was unanimously accepted by the committee members. Special attention was paid to the fact that this vow affected the whole country in order to create a unifying bond. As a result, the Landsturm experienced an unexpected influx of volunteers. When Tyrolean troops surprisingly defeated the French, Sacred Heart Sunday became a high feast.

== Significance of the Sacred Heart Fire ==
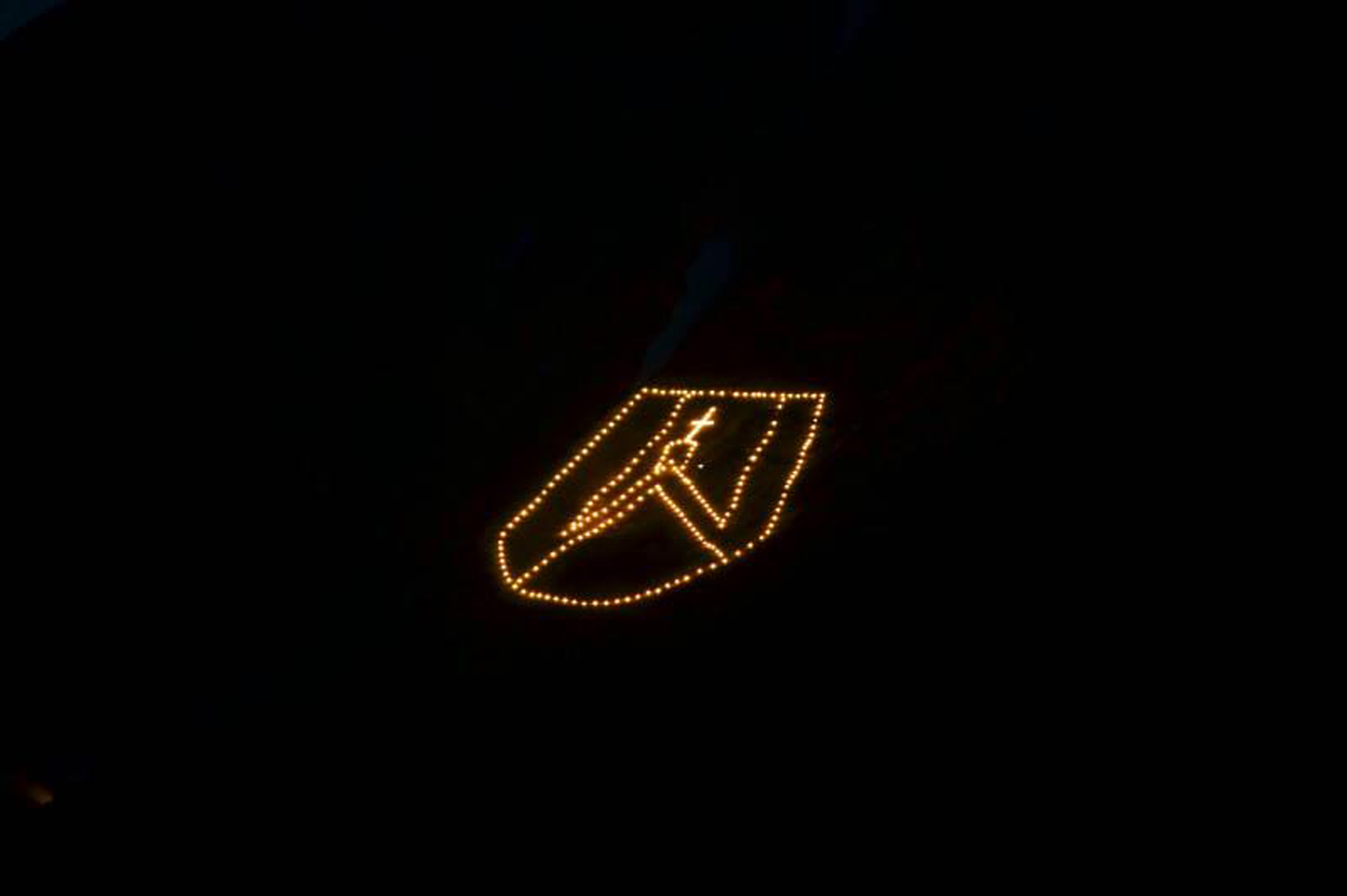
Sacred Hear of Jesus Fire with the coat of arms of Achenkirch on the shore of the Achensee on the Seekar (Karwendel mountains)

At that time there were not many possibilities to communicate with distant compatriots. For this reason, signal fires were lit at certain peaks to call for the Landsturm. However, these mountain fires also had something mystical, so that they were lit on the occasion of the festive celebration of the Sacred Heart of Jesus. Thus the Sacred Heart fires came more and more into the foreground compared to the usual solstice fires up to that time.

== Recent times ==
This tradition is still cultivated today and underlines the connection between the different regions. The fires are often arranged in the form of hearts, crosses or the signs of Christ ("INRI" or "IHS").

== Wildfire ==
Due to the nature of these fires, wildfires are a constant threat. A recent example of this was on the evening of Saturday 9 June 2018 when groups put torches on wooden branches on a steep mountain slope above Sautens, Ötztal, Tyrol. On 10 of June, Sacred Heart Sunday, fire brigades, supported by a helicopter, extinguished the resulting fire, which affected 500 m² of the forest.
