= Christ the King =

Title of Jesus in Christianity

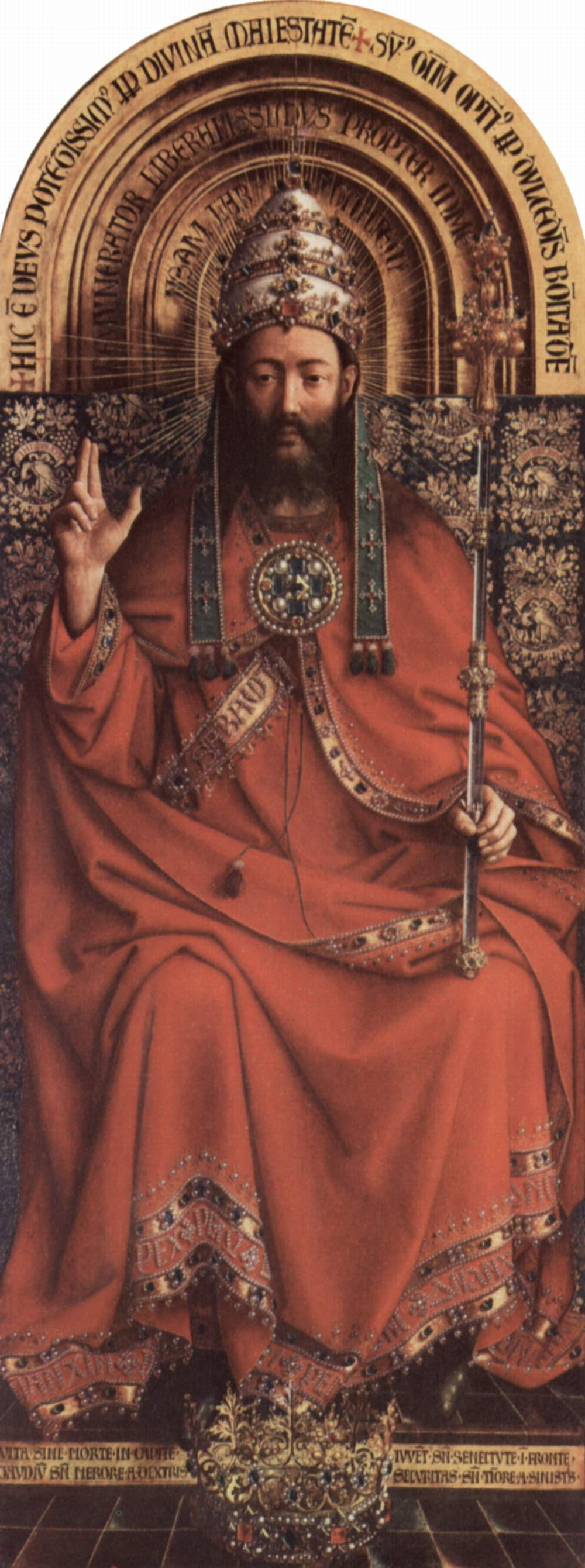
Christ the King, a detail from the Ghent Altarpiece by Jan van Eyck. St Bavo's Cathedral, Ghent.

Christ the King is a title of Jesus in Christianity referring to the idea of the Kingdom of God where Christ is described as being seated at the right hand of God. Many Christian denominations consider the kingly office of Christ to be one of the threefold offices: Christ is a prophet, priest, and king. The title "Christ the King" is frequently used as a name for churches, schools, seminaries, hospitals, and religious institutes.

== Background ==
In the Gospel of Luke, the angel Gabriel announces to Mary, "Behold, you will conceive in your womb and bear a son, and you shall name him Jesus. He will be great and will be called Son of the Most High, and the Lord God will give him the throne of David his father, and he will rule over the house of Jacob forever, and of his kingdom there will be no end." In the Book of Revelation (17:14) it is declared that the Lamb is "King of kings, and Lord of lords".

The concept of Christ as king was the subject of an address given by Eusebius about AD 314. Depictions of the imperial Christ arise in the later part of the 4th century. Christ Pantokrator ("Ruler of All") is one of the most common religious icons of Orthodox Christianity. The Western equivalent is Christ in Majesty.

== Pius XI ==
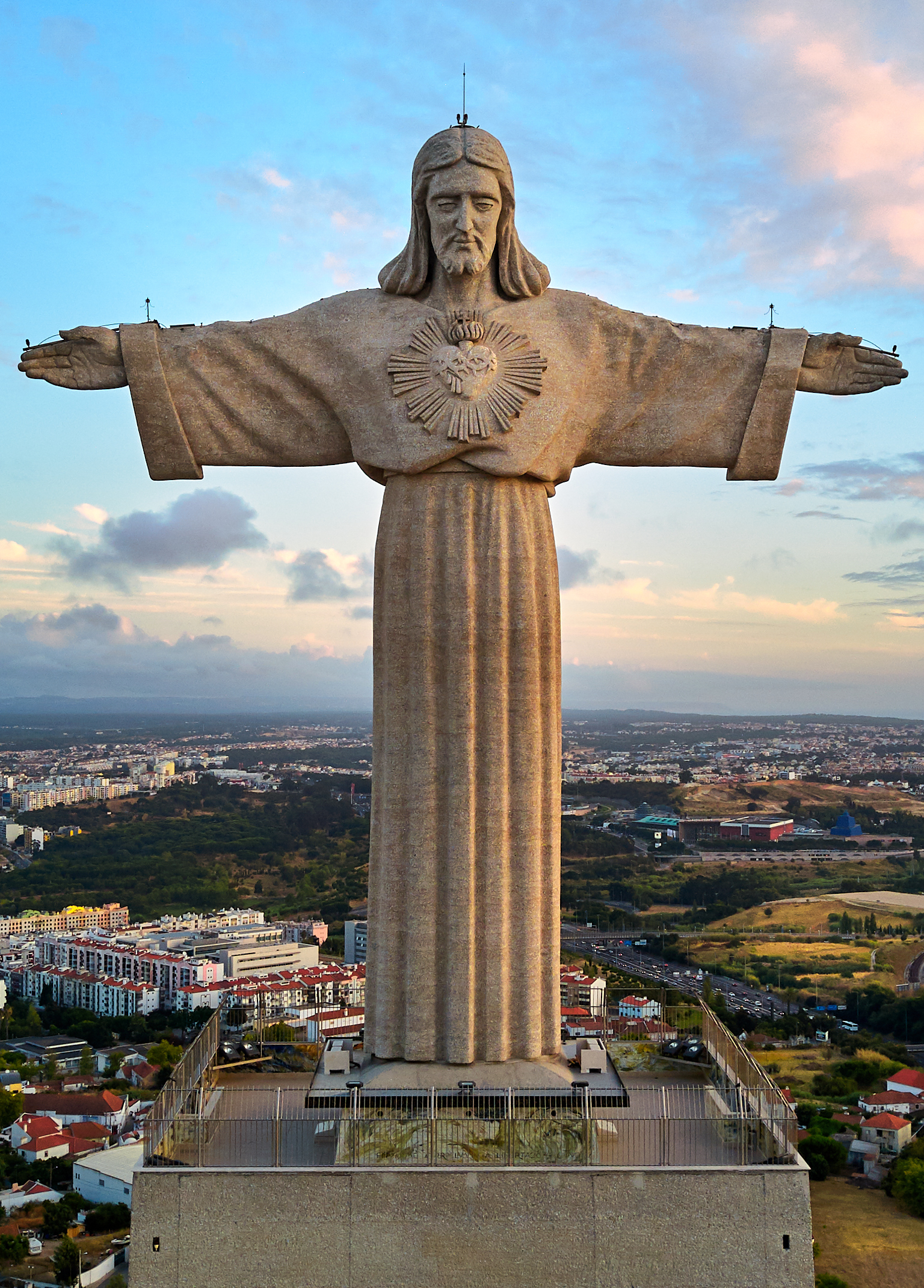
The Christ the King monument and National shrine in Almada, Portugal

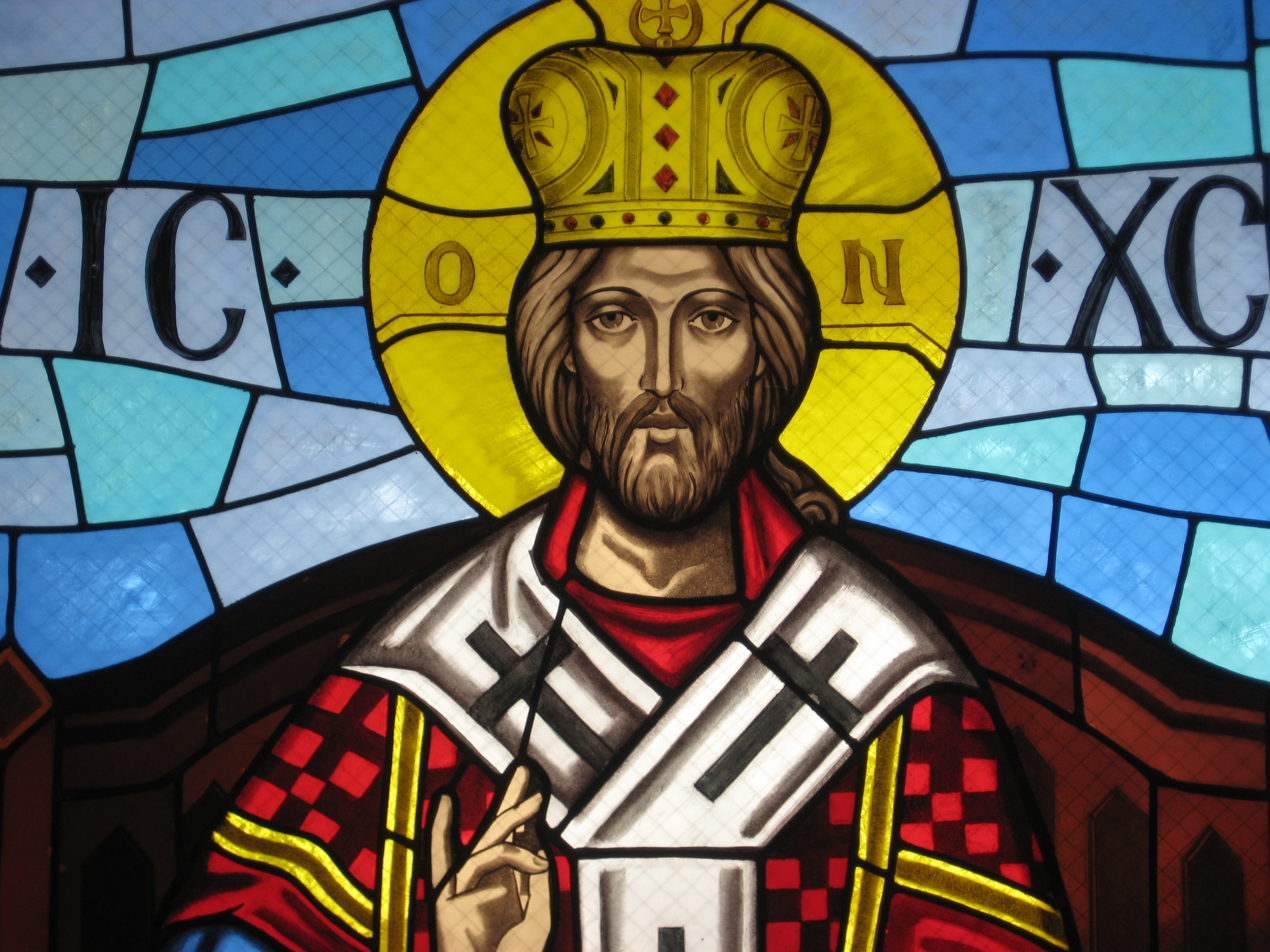
Stained glass window at the Annunciation Melkite Catholic Cathedral in Roslindale, Massachusetts, depicting Christ the King in the regalia of a Byzantine emperor

Pope Pius XI's first encyclical was Ubi arcano Dei consilio of December 1922. Writing in the aftermath of World War I, Pius noted that while there had been a cessation of hostilities, there was no true peace. He deplored the rise of class divisions and unbridled nationalism, and held that true peace can only be found under the Kingship of Christ as "Prince of Peace". "For Jesus Christ reigns over the minds of individuals by his teachings, in their hearts by His love, in each one's life by the living according to His law and the imitating of His example."

Christ's kingship was addressed again in Pius's encyclical Quas primas, published in 1925. Michael D. Greaney calls it "possibly one of the most misunderstood and ignored encyclicals of all time." The encyclical quotes with approval Cyril of Alexandria, noting that Jesus's kingship was given to him by the Father and was not obtained by violence: "'Christ,' it says, 'has dominion over all creatures, a dominion not seized by violence nor usurped, but his by essence and by nature.'" It also references Pope Leo XIII's 1899 Annum sacrum wherein Leo relates the Kingship of Christ to devotion to his Sacred Heart.

In November 1926 Pius gave his assent to the establishment of the first church dedicated to Christ under the title of King. The Church of Our Lord, Christ the King, a young parish in the neighborhood of Mount Lookout, Cincinnati, which had previously been operating out of a pharmacy located in the neighborhood square, soon began to flourish. In May 1927, a proper sanctuary and neighborhood icon was consecrated. Designed by architect Edward J. Schulte, the building exemplifies the designer's signature marriage of art deco decoration in brutalist construction, principally arranged to mimic ancient liturgical spaces of early Christianity.

=== Feast of Christ the King ===
The Solemnity of Our Lord Jesus Christ, King of the Universe was instituted by Pius in 1925. The General Roman Calendar of 1969 moved its observance in the Roman Rite to the last Sunday of Ordinary Time, the final Sunday of the liturgical year. Most Anglicans, Lutherans and some Protestants celebrate it on the same day. However, Catholics who observe the pre-Vatican II General Roman Calendar of 1960, and members of the Anglican Catholic Church celebrate it instead on the last Sunday of October, the Sunday before All Saints' Day, the day assigned in 1925.

== Oklahoma ==
In April 2025, the Oklahoma Legislature voted to proclaim Christ is King and recognize "the enduring influence of Christian faith in the lives of its people".

== See also ==
- Jesus is Lord
- Cristo Rei, the Portuguese translation used for several place names
- Cristo Rey, the Spanish translation used for several place names
  - Viva Cristo Rey, Spanish slogan famously used in the Cristero War
- The Kingdom of God and the Kingdom of Heaven are theological concepts interpreted variously
- Cornelius Lucey, Christus Rex Society, 1941
- Peter McKevitt, Christus Rex Society, 1941
- Throne of God
- Symbolism of domes
- Jesus, King of the Jews
- Enthronement movement
- King Messiah, one of the designations in Judaism to refer to the messiah
