= Quas primas =

1925 encyclical by Pope Pius XI introducing the Feast of Christ the King

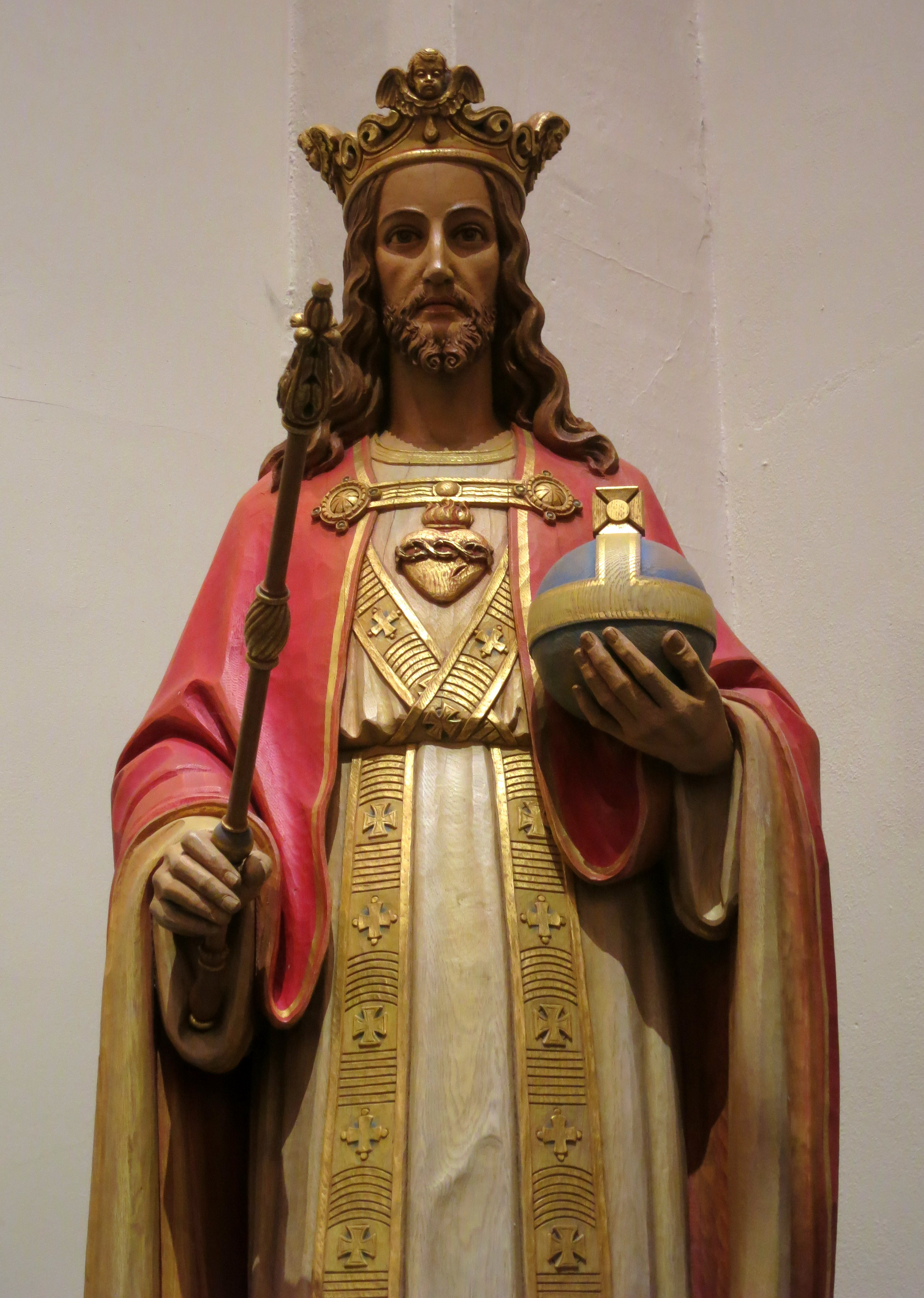
Christ the King, Cathedral of the Immaculate Conception, (Peoria, Ill.)

Quas primas (from Latin: "In the first") is an encyclical of Pope Pius XI. Promulgated on December 11, 1925, it introduced the Feast of Christ the King.

== Purpose and content ==
Quas primas followed Pius's initial encyclical, Ubi arcano Dei consilio, which he referred to in his opening statement:

...manifold evils in the world were due to the fact that the majority of men had thrust Jesus Christ and his holy law out of their lives; that these had no place either in private affairs or in politics: and we said further, that as long as individuals and states refused to submit to the rule of our Savior, there would be no really hopeful prospect of a lasting peace among nations.

In Ubi arcano, Pius enjoined the faithful to seek "the Peace of Christ in the Kingdom of Christ".

Quas primas established the Feast of Christ the King, which was Pope Pius XI's response to the world's increasing secularization and nationalism.

It was written in the aftermath of World War I and the Revolutions of 1917–1923, which saw the fall of the Hohenzollerns, Romanovs, Habsburgs and Ottomans. In contrast, Pope Pius XI pointed to a king "of whose kingdom there shall be no end". In 1925 the Pope asked the French Dominican priest Édouard Hugon, professor of philosophy and theology at the Pontifical University of Saint Thomas Aquinas, Angelicum, to work on Quas primas.

"[T]he Word of God, as consubstantial with the Father, has all things in common with him, and therefore has necessarily supreme and absolute dominion over all things created". In Matthew 28:18 Jesus himself says, "All power in heaven and on earth has been given to me." In Revelation 19:16 Christ is recognized as "King of kings and Lord of lords."

The encyclical summarised both the Old Testament and the New Testament teaching on the kingship of Christ. Invoking an earlier encyclical Annum sacrum of Pope Leo XIII, Pius XI suggested that the Kingdom of Christ embraces the whole mankind. Pius explained that by virtue of Christ's claim to kingship as creator and redeemer, societies as well as individuals owe him obligations as king.

So he is said to reign "in the hearts of men," both by reason of the keenness of his intellect and the extent of his knowledge, and also because he is very truth, and it is from him that truth must be obediently received by all mankind. He reigns, too, in the wills of men, for in him the human will was perfectly and entirely obedient to the Holy Will of God, and further by his grace and inspiration he so subjects our free-will as to incite us to the most noble endeavors. He is King of hearts, too, by reason of his "charity which exceedeth all knowledge.

— Quas primas, §7

== Significance for laity ==
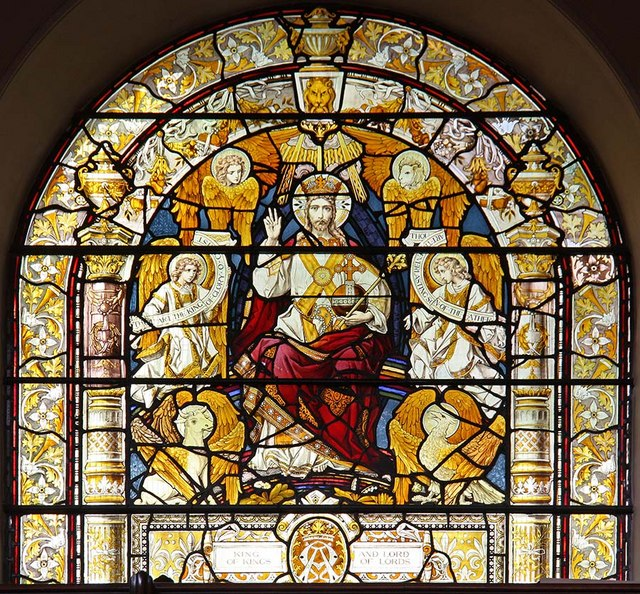
Christ the King, St Botolph without Aldersgate, London

While the encyclical was addressed to Catholic bishops, Pope Pius XI wanted the feast of Christ the King to encourage the laity:

The faithful, moreover, by meditating upon these truths, will gain much strength and courage, enabling them to form their lives after the true Christian ideal. If to Christ our Lord is given all power in heaven and on earth; if all men, purchased by his precious blood, are by a new right subjected to his dominion; if this power embraces all men, it must be clear that not one of our faculties is exempt from his empire. He must reign in our minds, which should assent with perfect submission and firm belief to revealed truths and to the doctrines of Christ. He must reign in our wills, which should obey the laws and precepts of God. He must reign in our hearts, which should spurn natural desires and love God above all things, and cleave to him alone. He must reign in our bodies and in our members, which should serve as instruments for the interior sanctification of our souls, or to use the words of the Apostle Paul, as instruments of justice unto God.

— Quas primas, §33
