= Christ the King School =

Christ the King School may refer to:

- Christ the King Catholic High School, Preston, Lancashire, England
- Christ the King Catholic High School, Southport, Merseyside, England
- Christ the King High School (Antigua), St. John's, Antigua and Barbuda
- Christ The King Elementary School, Brantford, Ontario, Canada
- Christ the King Sixth Form College, London, England
- Christ the King School of Cavite, Philippines

== United States ==
- Christ the King Cathedral School, Lubbock, Texas
- Christ the King Catholic High School (North Carolina)
- Christ the King Catholic School (Dallas, Texas), a Texas Association parochial school
- Christ the King Catholic School (Oklahoma City, Oklahoma)
- Christ the King Catholic School (Pleasant Hill, California)
- Christ the King Catholic School (Tampa, Florida), a school in Hillsborough County, Florida
- Christ the King Preparatory School (New Jersey)
- Christ the King Regional High School, Queens, New York
- Christ the King School (Atlanta, Georgia)
- Christ the King Catholic School (Tampa, Florida)
