= Christ the King Anglican College =

Coordinates: 35°55′24″S 145°39′35″E

Cobram Anglican Grammar School
- Campbell Road Campus; 40-48 Campbell Road, Cobram, Victoria; Australia

Information
- Type: Independent co-educational primary and secondary day school
- Motto: Integrity, Endeavour, Community
- Religious affiliation: Anglican Diocese of Wangaratta
- Denomination: Anglican
- Established: 2000; 26 years ago
- Status: Open
- Principal: Keith Willett
- Years: Foundation to 12
- Affiliation: Anglican Schools Commission
- Website: cags.vic.edu.au

Cobram Anglican Grammar School (CAGS) is a small co-educational school in Cobram, Victoria, Australia. It was founded in 2000 as Christ the King Anglican College, before changing its name in 2015 when the school was acquired by the Anglican Schools Commission (Inc.). The motto of the school is "Integrity, Endeavour, Community". The current principal is Mr Keith Willett.

== Overview ==
The school campus is located on Campbell Road Cobram, opposite the Cobram Sports Stadium and just a short walk from the Murray River. The school as of 2025, offers classes for students from Foundation through to Year 12. And although small in size compared to other independent/private schools in the region, CAGS offers curriculum closely aligned with the current Victorian and Australian Curriculum as well as a wide range of extra subjects for the senior students such as Woodwork, Food Technology, Art, Biology, Legal Studies, Agriculture and many more.

As of the first three quarters of 2025, the school's campus includes many special purpose facilities, these include a library, an Art/Textiles/Woodwork/automotive wing, a Performing Arts Center (PAC), Science Laboratory, Computer and STEM Lab, a large Agriculture Center, and soon to come Trade Centre.
