= Garajau =

Protected area in Portugal

Garajau Partial Nature Reserve
- Reserva Natural Parcial do Garajau
- IUCN category Ia (strict nature reserve)
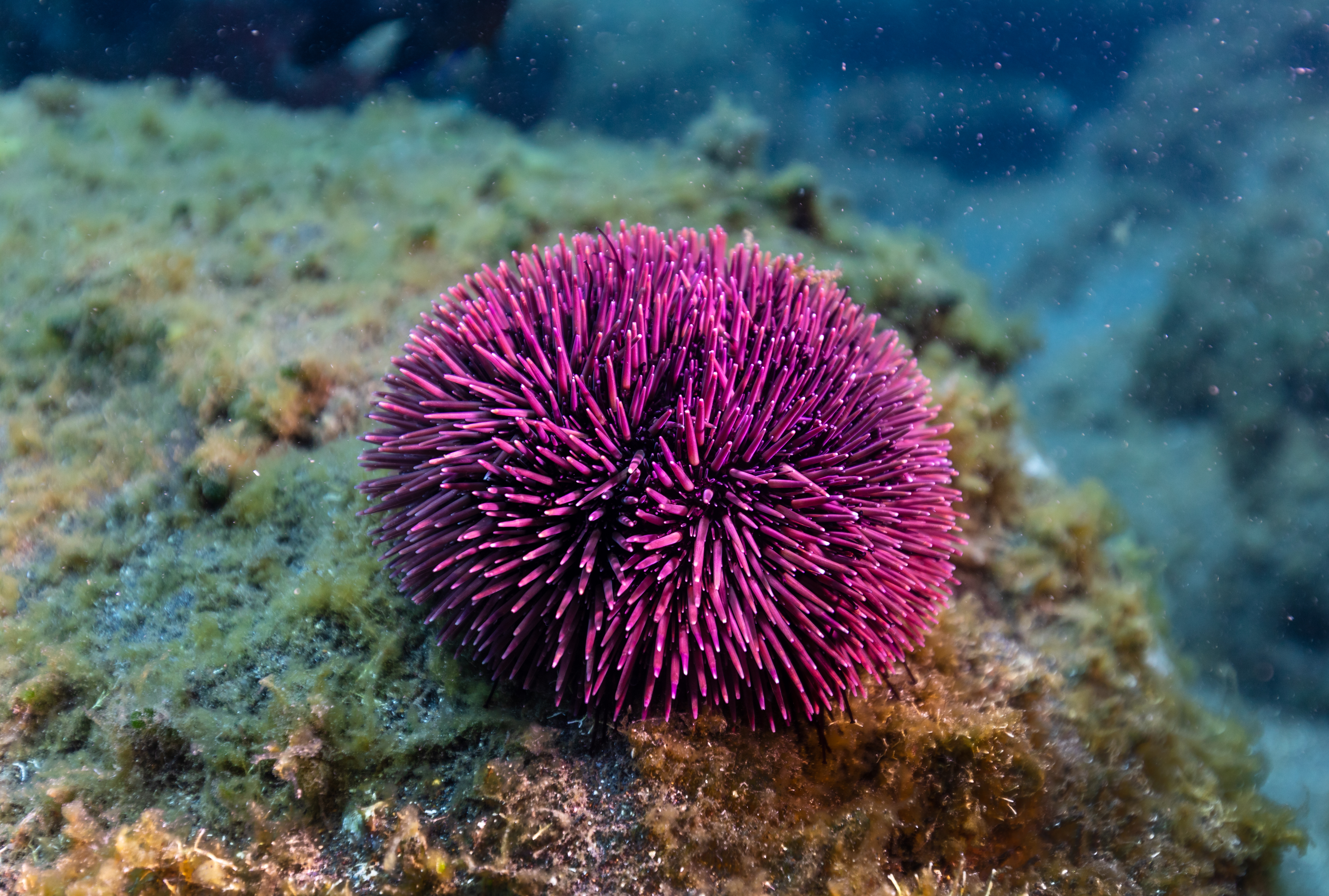
- Purple sea urchin (Sphaerechinus granularis) at Garajau Marine Natural Reserve
- Interactive map of Garajau Partial Nature Reserve
- Coordinates: 32°38′N 16°51′W
- Area: 376 ha (930 acres)
- Max. elevation: 0
- Min. elevation: 50 m (160 ft) below sea level
- Designated: 1986

The Garajau Partial Nature Reserve is a Portuguese marine reserve located on the Funchal Bay offshore Madeira Island. The protected area has existed since 1986.

It is a location for snorkelling and scuba-diving. Dive centres exist in the Garajau Reserve. The Garajau reserve is listed on ‘the MPA Global’ a marine-focused database of the world's protected areas that have some intertidal and/or subtidal component.

Marine species that can be seen in the Garajau Reserve include dusky groupers (Epinephelus marginatus), moray eels (Muraena helena) and garden eels (Taenioconger longissimus). Hunting and fishing are forbidden within the Madeiran marine reserves. The second marine nature reserve in Madeira is on the north coast of the island: Rocha do Navio.
