= Christ the King (Madeira) =

Cristo Rei
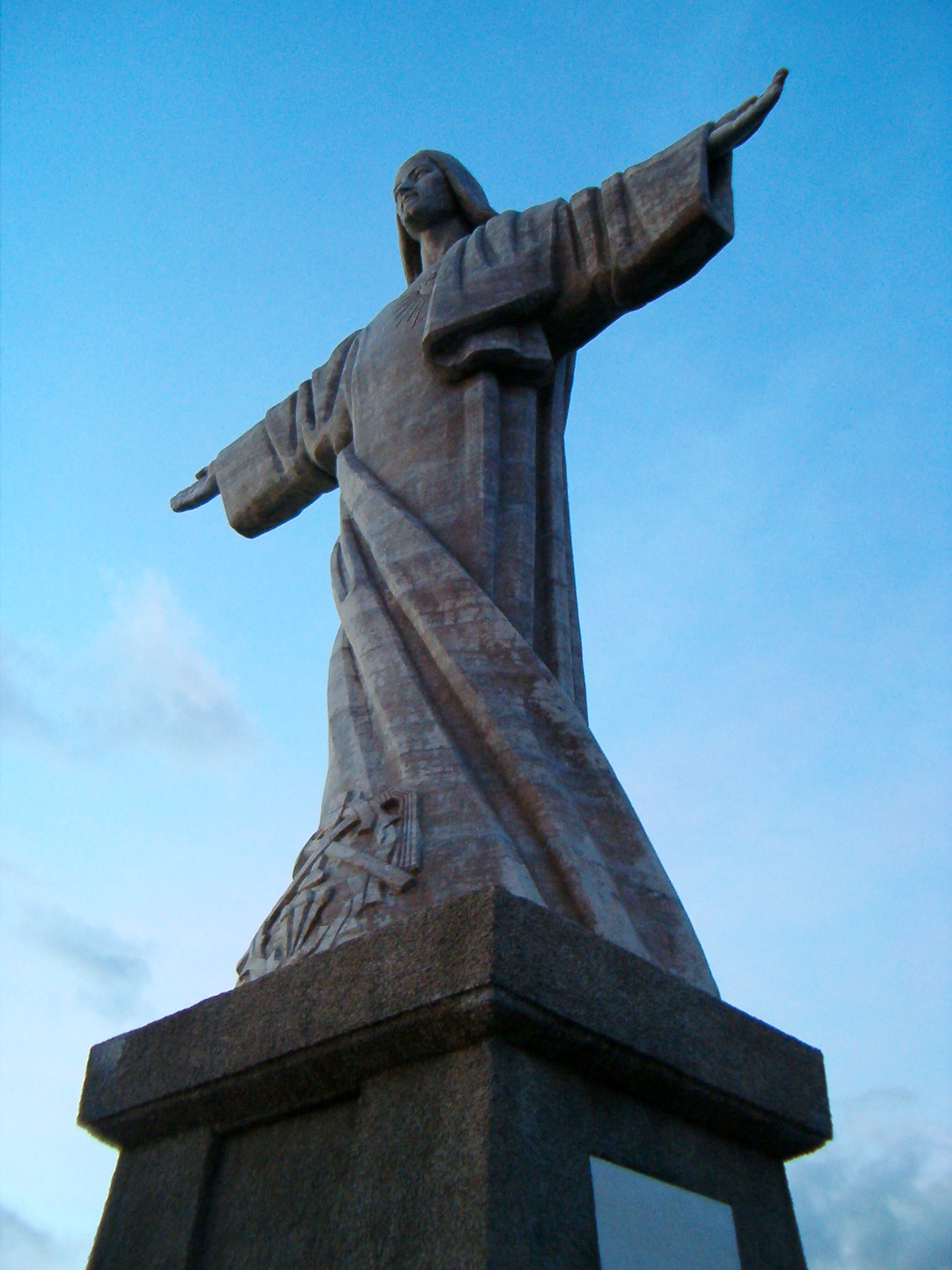
- Interactive map of Cristo Rei
- Location: Garajau, Madeira
- Coordinates: 32.6386°N 16.8507°W
- Height: 15 metres (49 ft) tall with its pedestal
- Completion date: October 30, 1927

The Christ the King statue (Portuguese: Cristo Rei) also known as the Sacred Heart statue, is an Art Deco statue of Jesus Christ in Garajau, Madeira.

== History ==
It is here that non catholic Christians were thrown from the cliffs as only Catholics were allowed to be buried on the island until 1770 when the British Cemetery of Funchal was established for non catholic Christians. The Jewish Cemetery of Funchal was established in 1851. The statue was built in remembrance of the function of the area's history.

The statue was built in 1927 and consecrated on October 30, 1927. Financed by the local lawyer Aires de Ornelas and his wife, created by French artists Georges Serraz and Pierre Charles Lenoir. The statue was completed 4 years before Christ the Redeemer statue in Brazil.

== See also ==
- Christ the Redeemer, in Rio de Janeiro, Brazil
- Cristo-Rei in Lisbon, Portugal (28 m)
- List of statues of Jesus
