= Christ the King Catholic School (Oklahoma City) =

Location
- Oklahoma City, Oklahoma; United States
- Coordinates: 35°33′11″N 97°33′27″W

Information
- Religious affiliation: Catholic
- Founded: 1949
- Principal: Amy Feighny
- Website: Christ the King School

Christ the King Catholic School is a Catholic private school in Oklahoma City, Oklahoma. Founded in 1949, the school was first run by the Benedictine Sisters. Christ the King operates as a parish school for grades Pre-Kindergarten through Eighth Grade. The principal is Amy Feighny, and its vice principals are Robert Crump and Jenny Richard. Students attend a Catholic Mass every Thursday, and attending Mass on Sunday is widely promoted.
