= Christ the King (Lubango) =

Catholic monument in Angola inspired by Christ the Redeemer in Rio de Janeiro

- Portuguese: Cristo Rei
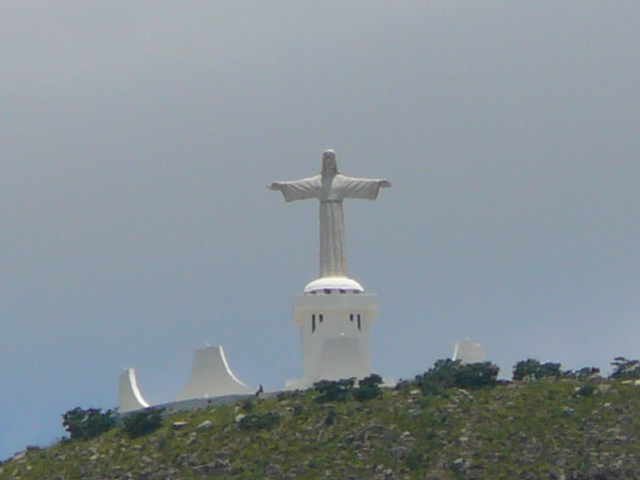
- Cristo Rei in Lubango
- Location: Lubango, Angola
- Coordinates: 14°56′21.3″S 13°30′43.42″E
- Designer: Frazão Sardinha
- Height: 2,130 metres (6,990 ft)
- Beginning date: 1957

The Christ the King statue (Portuguese: Cristo Rei) is a Catholic monument and shrine overlooking the city of Lubango in the South of Angola. It was inspired by the Christ the Redeemer statue in Rio de Janeiro (Brazil), as one of only four in the world. This 30-metre-high (98 ft) white marble statue was built in 1957.

The monument was designed in the 1950s by Portuguese engineer of Madeira, Frazão Sardinha, and the country's Ministry of Culture declared it an Angolan World Heritage Site as of April 18, 2014.

== History ==
The statue was built in 1957, by the settlers of the region of Madeira (Portugal). It was built as a Catholic landmark, but represented colonial interests in various Portuguese countries during the colonial period.

== Architecture ==
Built on a base of cement and hydraulic lime, at an altitude of two thousand 130 meters above sea level, the monument rests on a foundation of stones, cement and bricks, with two levels to support a ladder to the last, which is more practical view the statue.

== See also ==
- List of statues of Jesus
