= Ubi arcano Dei consilio =

1922 papal encyclical by Pius XI

Ubi arcano Dei consilio Latin for 'When in the inscrutable designs of God' Encyclical of Pope Pius XI
- Signature date: 23 December 1922
- Subject: On the Peace of Christ in the Kingdom of Christ
- Number: 1 of 31 of the pontificate
- Text: In Latin; In English

Ubi arcano Dei consilio (English: When in the inscrutable designs of God) was Pius XI's first encyclical. Promulgated 23 December 1922, it is subtitled "On the Peace of Christ in the Kingdom of Christ".

== Context ==
Pius XI was elected to the papacy on 6 February 1922. He took as his papal motto Pax Christi in Regno Christi (translated "The Peace of Christ in the Kingdom of Christ)". He followed the theme of Pius X, Instaurare Omnia in Christo ("To Restore All Things in Christ"). He observed that the recent Great War had not brought true peace, and to counter that, the Church and Christianity should be active in, not insulated from, society:

Since the close of the Great War individuals, the different classes of society, the nations of the earth have not as yet found true peace... the old rivalries between nations have not ceased to exert their influence.... Conditions have become increasingly worse because the fears of the people are being constantly played upon by the ever-present menace of new wars, likely to be more frightful and destructive than any which have preceded them. Whence it is that the nations of today live in a state of armed peace which is scarcely better than war itself, a condition which tends to exhaust national finances, to waste the flower of youth, to muddy and poison the very fountainheads of life, physical, intellectual, religious, and moral.

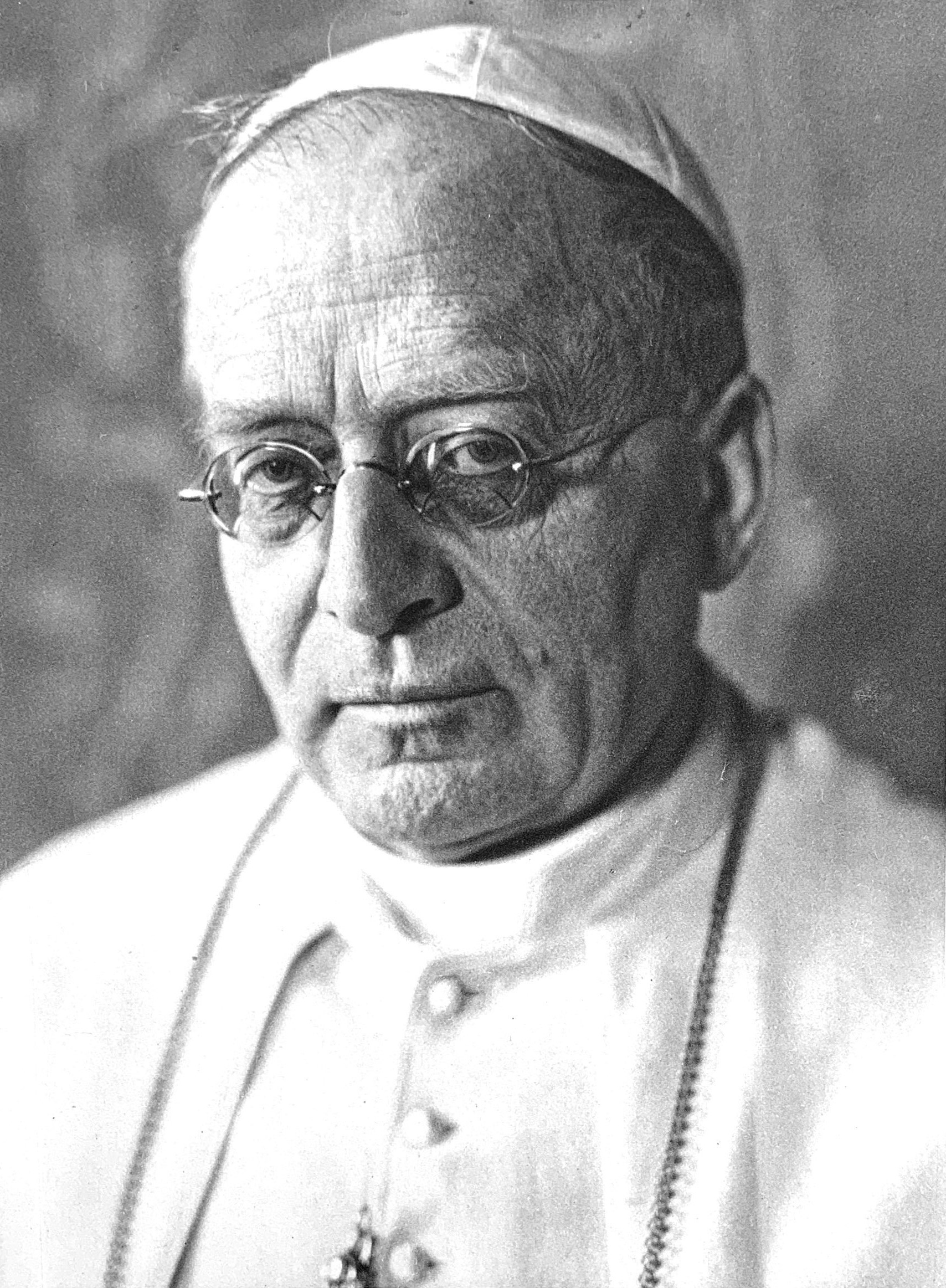
Pius XI

Pius took note of persistent class warfare and political parties, which rather than pursue a disinterested search for what would best promote the common welfare, desire power and protection for some private interest, which inevitably results in injury to the citizens as a whole. He stated that the principles of the Catholic faith can easily be reconciled with any reasonable and just system of government, but that such governments are the most exposed to the danger of being overthrown by one faction or another:

"Patriotism - the stimulus of so many virtues and of so many noble acts of heroism when kept within the bounds of the law of Christ - becomes merely an occasion, an added incentive to grave injustice when true love of country is debased to the condition of an extreme nationalism, when we forget that all men are our brothers and members of the same great human family, that other nations have an equal right with us both to life and to prosperity, that it is never lawful nor even wise, to dissociate morality from the affairs of practical life...."

He deplored the fact that churches turned to secular uses had not yet been restored to their intended function; the lack of clergy, many of whom served as chaplains and died in the war; and the fact that a number of seminaries had not re-opened.

He attributed much of society's ills to concupiscence, which he described as inordinate desire for pleasure, the inordinate desire for possessions and the inordinate desire to rule or to domineer over others. Pius proclaimed that true peace cannot be found except under the Kingship of Christ as "Prince of Peace" and exhorted bishops to strive for its realisation.

== Catholic Action ==
The document promoted the "Catholic Action" movement. The idea was to involve lay men and women in an organisation, under the supervision of the bishops, which would in varied ways manifest the social teachings of the church through direct service to the poor and those who lived on the margins of society.

Pius XI also gave his approval to specialised movements like the Jocists, associations of young Catholic industrial workers who aimed to Christianise the workforce, and to provide a Catholic alternative to communist and socialist trade unions.

== See also ==
- Quas primas
