= Ifinger =

Italian mountain

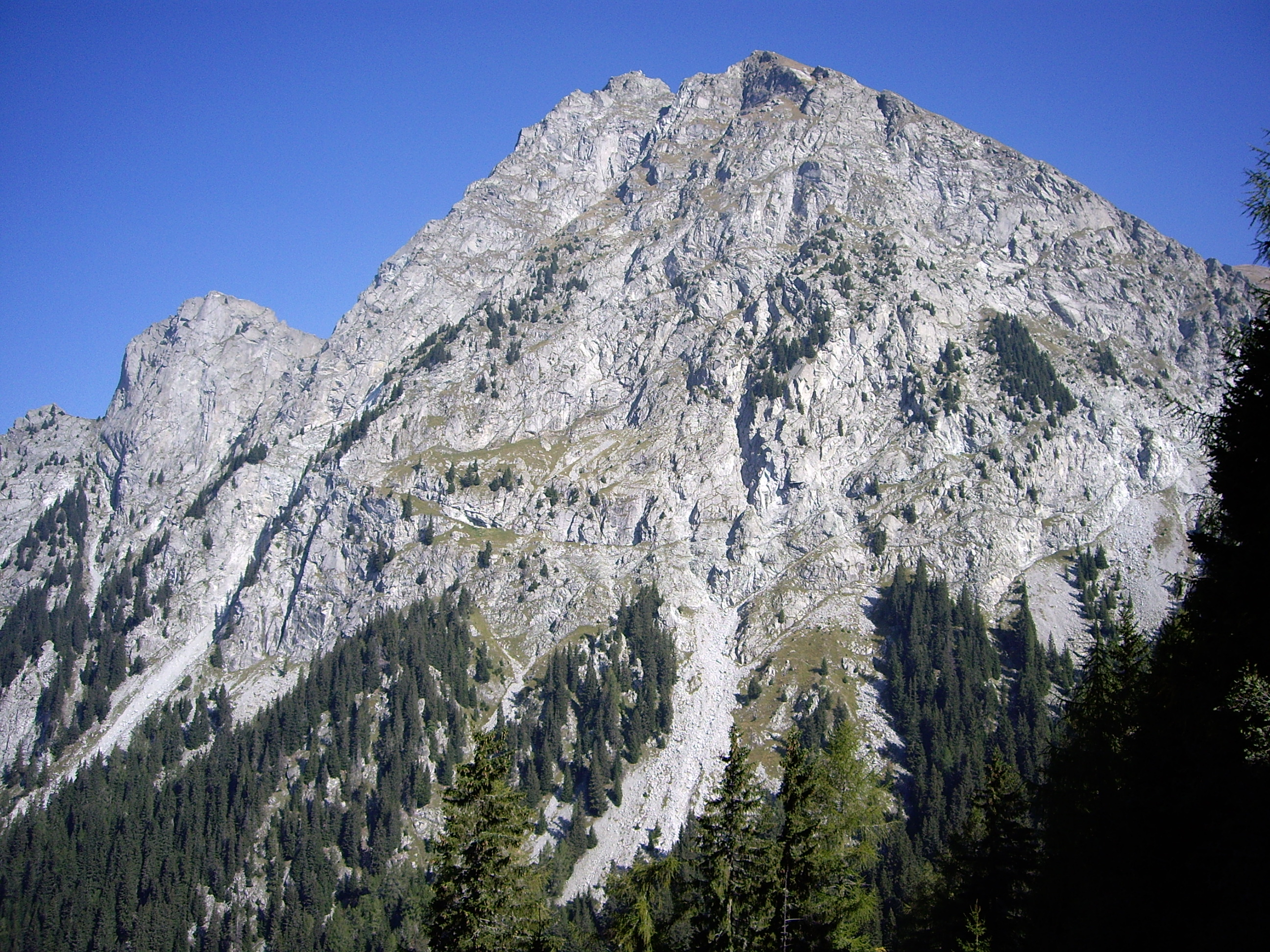

Highest point
- Elevation: 2,581 m (8,468 ft)
- Coordinates: 46°41′35.71″N 11°15′19.77″E

Geography
- Location: South Tyrol, Italy
- Parent range: Sarntal Alps

The Ifinger is a mountain in the Sarntal Alps in South Tyrol, Italy.
