= Depiction of Jesus =

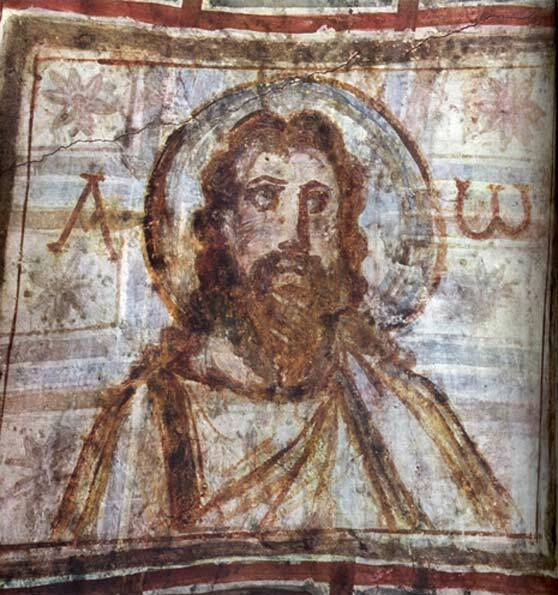
A mural painting from the catacomb of Commodilla. One of the first bearded images of Jesus, late 4th century.

The depiction of Jesus in pictorial form dates back to early Christian art and architecture, as aniconism in Christianity was rejected within the ante-Nicene period. It took several centuries to reach a conventional standardized form for his physical appearance, which has subsequently remained largely stable since that time. Most images of Jesus have in common a number of traits which are now almost universally associated with Jesus, although variants are seen.

The conventional image of a fully bearded Jesus with long hair emerged around AD 300, but did not become established until the 6th century in Eastern Christianity, and much later in the West. It has always had the advantage of being easily recognizable, and distinguishing Jesus from other figures shown around him, which the use of a cruciform halo also achieves. Earlier images were much more varied.

Images of Jesus tend to show ethnic characteristics similar to those of the culture in which the image has been created. Beliefs that certain images are historically authentic, or have acquired an authoritative status from Church tradition, remain powerful among some of the faithful, in Eastern Orthodoxy, Lutheranism, Anglicanism, and Roman Catholicism. The Shroud of Turin is now the best-known example, though the Image of Edessa and the Veil of Veronica were better known in medieval times.

The representation of Jesus was controversial in the early period; the regional Synod of Elvira in Spain in 306 states in its 36th canon that no images should be in churches. Later, in the Eastern church, Byzantine iconoclasm banned and destroyed images of Christ for a period, before they returned in full strength. In the 16th-century Protestant Reformation, the followers of John Calvin in particular saw images of Christ as idolatrous and enforced their removal. Due to their understanding of the second of the Ten Commandments, most Evangelical Protestants still avoid displaying representations of Jesus in their places of worship.

== Early Christianity ==
=== Before Constantine ===
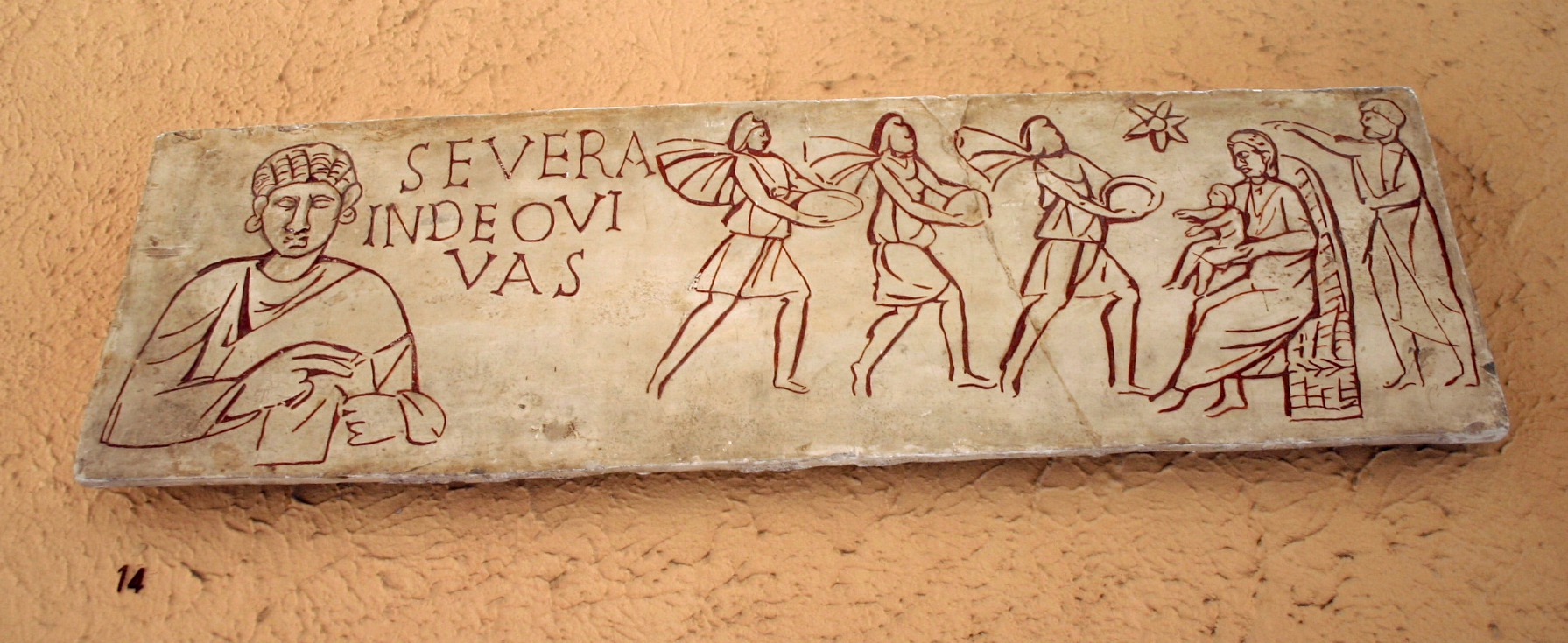
Incised sarcophagus slab with the Adoration of the Magi from the Catacombs of Rome, 3rd century. Plaster cast with added colour.

Except for Jesus wearing tzitzit—the tassels on a tallit—in Matthew 14:36 and Luke 8:43–44, there is no physical description of Jesus contained in any of the canonical Gospels. In the Acts of the Apostles, Jesus is said to have manifested as a "light from heaven" that temporarily blinded the Apostle Paul, but no specific form is given. In the Book of Revelation there is a vision the author had of "someone like a Son of Man" in spirit form: "dressed in a robe reaching down to his feet and with a golden sash around his chest. The hair on his head were white like wool, and his eyes were like blazing fire. His feet were like burnt bronze glowing in a furnace (...) His face was like the sun shining in all its brilliance" (Revelation 1:12–16, NIV). Use in art of the Revelation description of Jesus has generally been restricted to illustrations of the book itself, and nothing in the scripture confirms the spiritual form's resemblance to the physical form Jesus took in his life on Earth.

In the first-century AD, many Jews understood Exodus 20:4–6 ("Thou shalt not make unto thee any graven image") as a proscription against any depiction of humans or animals. Consequently, no figure art was produced for, or by, the Jewish communities in Judea and Galilee during Jesus' lifetime, or in the decades that followed. But attitudes towards the interpretation of this Commandment changed through the centuries, and by the third century, some Jewish communities were producing figure art. The frescos decorating the interior of Dura-Europos synagogue (c. 240 AD) depict many scenes from the Tanakh. They are the earliest-known examples of Jewish figure art.

During the persecution of Christians under the Roman Empire, Christian art was necessarily furtive and ambiguous, and there was hostility to idols in a group still with a large component of members with Jewish origins, surrounded by, and polemicising against, sophisticated pagan images of gods. Irenaeus (d. c. 202), Clement of Alexandria (d. 215), and Lactantius (c. 240–c. 320) disapproved of portrayals in images of Jesus. Eusebius of Caesaria, in his 4th century work The History of the Church, makes reference to a statue of Jesus that existed in the city of Caesaria, erected before his time, purportedly near the house of the Haemorrhoissa as a memorial to Jesus's having healed her affliction, around the base of which was "a certain strange plant, which climbs up to the hem of the brazen cloak, and is a remedy for all kinds of diseases." However it is also noted that Eusebius himself did not approve of such images and depictions of Christ, considering them to be idolatrous.

The 36th canon of the non-ecumenical Synod of Elvira in 306 AD reads, "It has been decreed that no pictures be had in the churches, and that which is worshipped or adored be not painted on the walls", which has been interpreted by John Calvin and other Protestants as an interdiction of the making of images of Christ. The issue remained the subject of controversy until the end of the 4th century.

The earliest surviving Christian art comes from the late 2nd to early 4th centuries on the walls of tombs belonging, most likely, to wealthy Christians in the catacombs of Rome, although from literary evidence there may well have been panel icons which, like almost all classical painting, have disappeared.

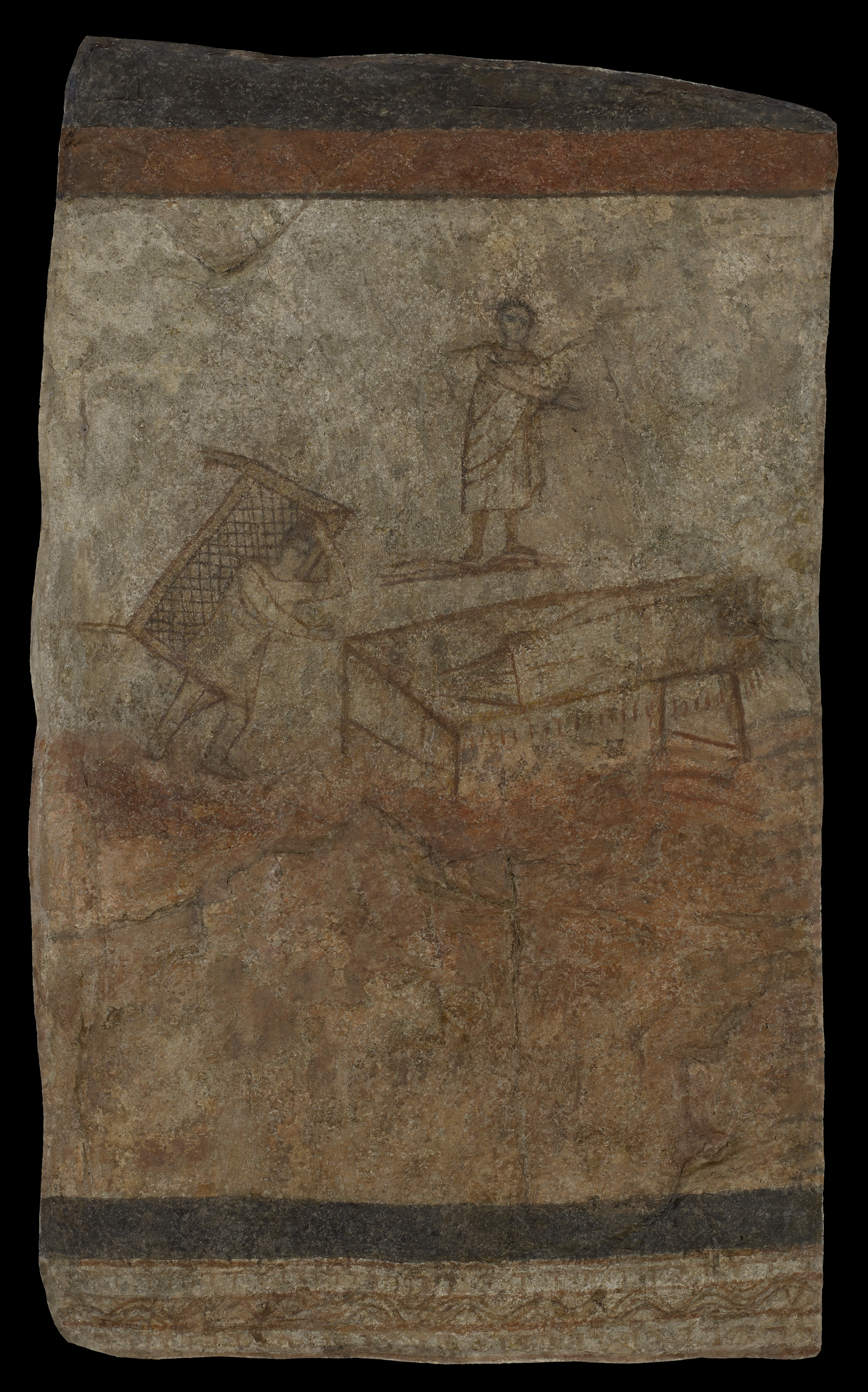
Dura Europos fresco which was dubbed The Healing of the Paralytic – one of the oldest possible depictions of Jesus, although there are different interpretations of the scene. from the Syrian city of Dura Europos, dating from about 235 AD

Initially Jesus was represented indirectly by pictogram symbols such as the ichthys (fish), the peacock, or an anchor (the Labarum or Chi-Rho was a later development). The staurogram seems to have been a very early representation of the crucified Jesus within the sacred texts. Later personified symbols were used, including Jonah, whose three days in the belly of the whale pre-figured the interval between Christ's death and resurrection; Daniel in the lion's den; or Orpheus charming the animals. The image of "The Good Shepherd", a beardless youth in pastoral scenes collecting sheep, was the most common of these images, and was probably not understood as a portrait of the historical Jesus at this period. It continues the classical Kriophoros ("ram-bearer" figure), and in some cases may also represent the Shepherd of Hermas, a popular Christian literary work of the 2nd century.

Among the earliest depictions clearly intended to directly represent Jesus himself are many showing him as a baby, usually held by his mother, especially in the Adoration of the Magi, seen as the first theophany, or display of the incarnate Christ to the world at large. The oldest known portrait of Jesus, found in Syria and dated to about 235, shows him as a beardless young man of authoritative and dignified bearing. He is depicted with close-cropped hair and wearing a tunic and pallium—the common male dress for much of Greco-Roman society, and similar to that found in the figure art in the Dura-Europos Synagogue.

The appearance of Jesus had some theological implications. While some Christians thought Jesus should have the beautiful appearance of a young classical hero, and the Gnostics tended to think he could change his appearance at will, for which they cited the Meeting at Emmaus as evidence, others including the Church Fathers Justin (d. 165) and Tertullian (d. 220) believed, following Isaiah 53:2, that Christ's appearance was unremarkable: "he had no form nor comeliness, that we should look upon him, nor beauty that we should delight in him." But when the pagan Celsus ridiculed the Christian religion for having an ugly God in about 180, Origen (d. 248) cited Psalm 45:3: "Gird thy sword upon thy thigh, mighty one, with thy beauty and fairness". Later the emphasis of leading Christian thinkers changed; Jerome (d. 420) and Augustine of Hippo (d. 430) argued that Jesus must have been ideally beautiful in face and body. For Augustine he was "beautiful as a child, beautiful on earth, beautiful in heaven."

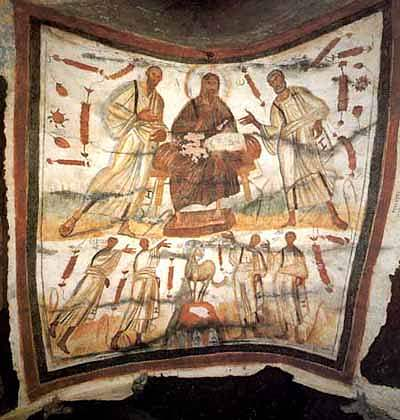
Bearded Jesus between Peter and Paul, Catacombs of Marcellinus and Peter, Rome. Second half of the 4th century. Such works "first present us with the fully formed image of Christ in Majesty that will so dominate Byzantine art." For detail of Christ, see this file.

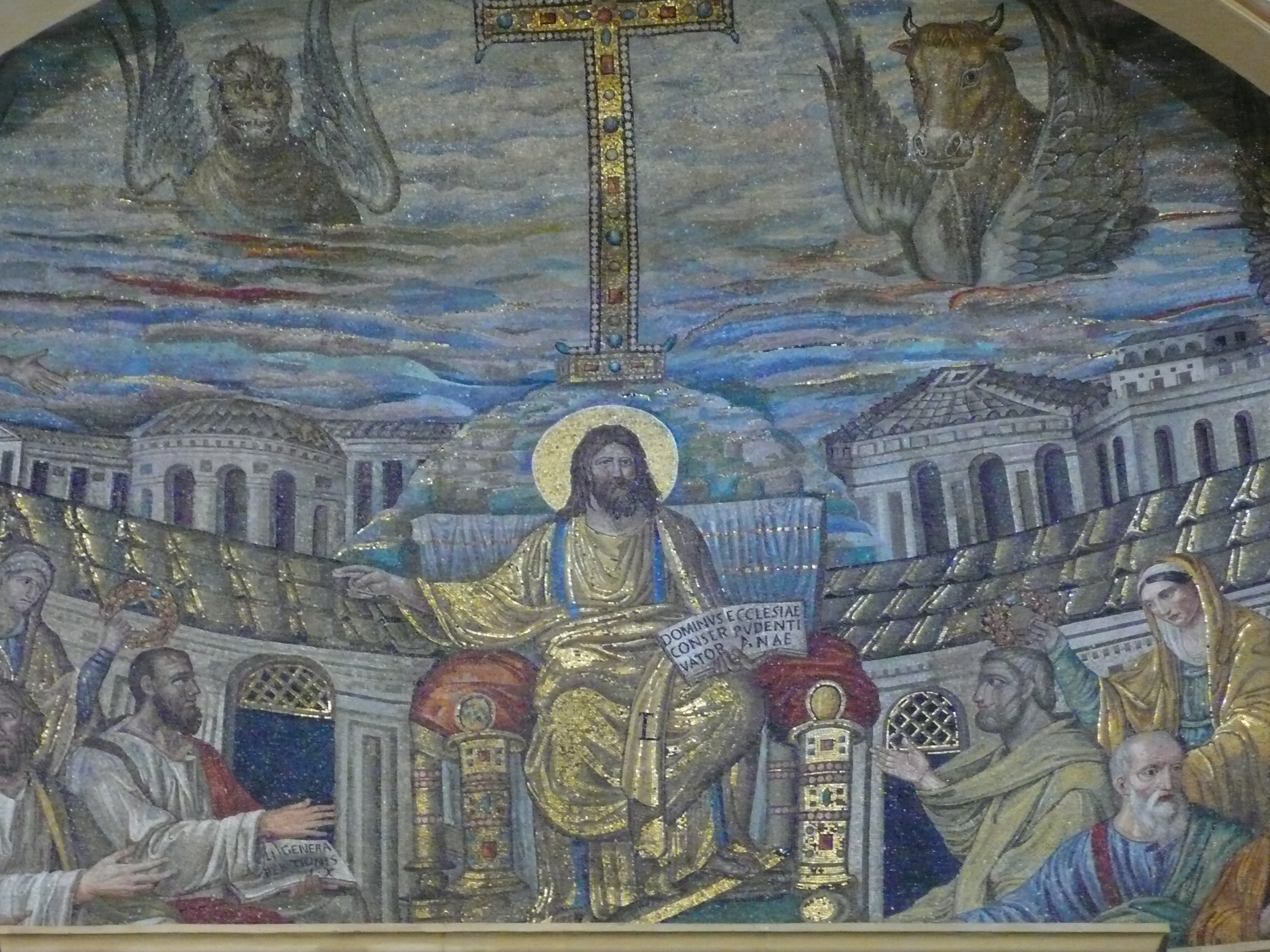
Christ Pantocrator in a Roman mosaic in the church of Santa Pudenziana, Rome, c. 400–410 AD during the Western Roman Empire

From the 3rd century onwards, the first narrative scenes from the Life of Christ to be clearly seen are the Baptism of Christ, painted in a catacomb in about 200, and the miracle of the Raising of Lazarus, both of which can be clearly identified by the inclusion of the dove of the Holy Spirit in Baptisms, and the vertical, shroud-wrapped body of Lazarus. Other scenes remain ambiguous—an agape feast may be intended as a Last Supper, but before the development of a recognised physical appearance for Christ, and attributes such as the halo, it is impossible to tell, as tituli or captions are rarely used. There are some surviving scenes from Christ's Works of about 235 from the Dura Europos church on the Persian frontier of the Empire. During the 4th century a much greater number of scenes came to be depicted, usually showing Christ as youthful, beardless and with short hair that does not reach his shoulders, although there is considerable variation.

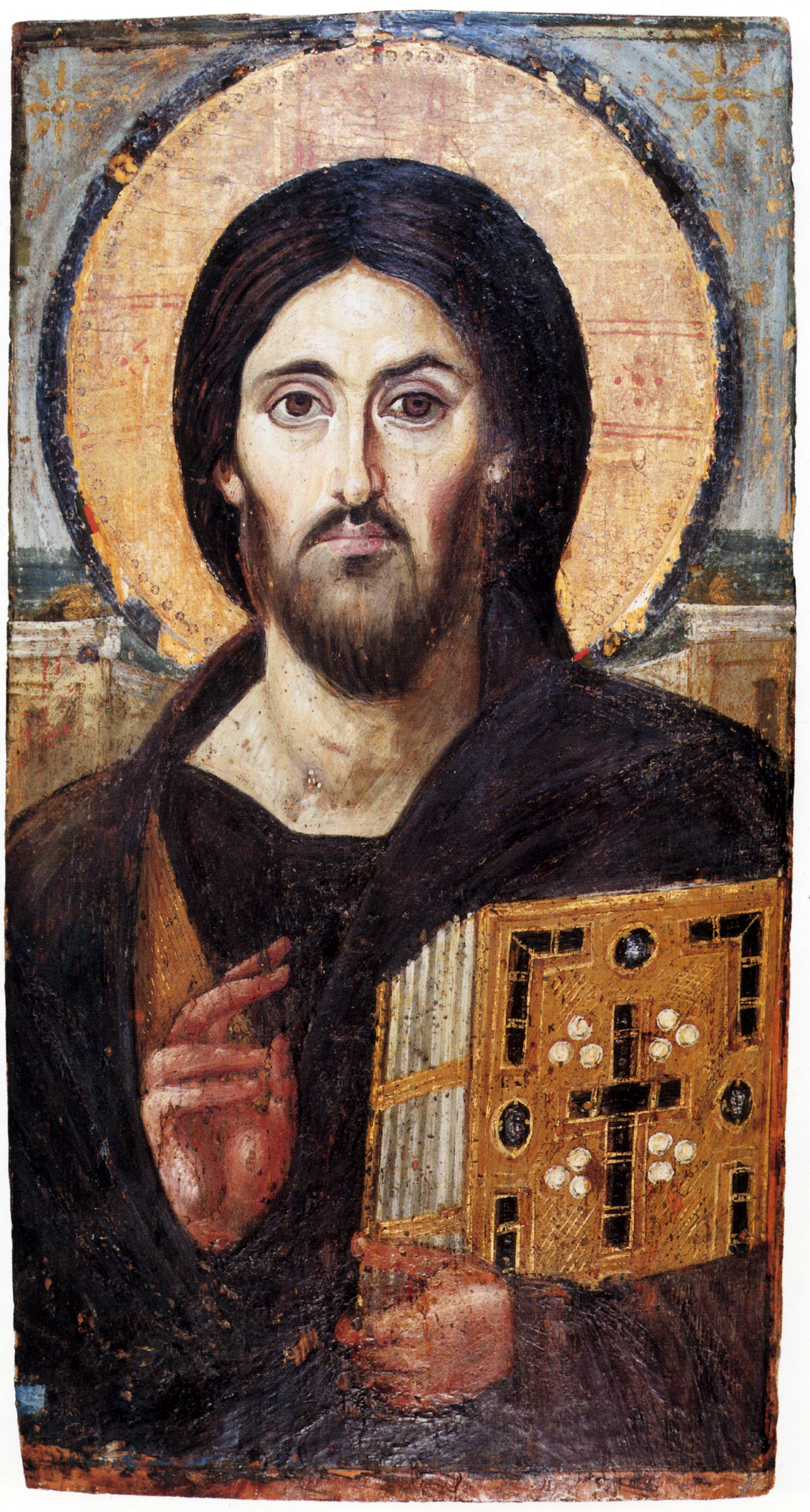
The oldest surviving panel icon of Christ Pantocrator, encaustic on panel, c. 6th century, showing the appearance of Jesus that is still immediately recognised today.

Jesus is sometimes shown performing miracles by means of a wand, as on the doors of Santa Sabina in Rome (430–32). He uses the wand to change water to wine, multiply the bread and fishes, and raise Lazarus. When pictured healing, he only lays on hands. The wand is thought to be a symbol of power. The bare-faced youth with the wand may indicate that Jesus was thought of as a user of magic or wonder worker by some of the early Christians. No art has been found picturing Jesus with a wand before the 2nd century. Some scholars suggest that the Gospel of Mark, the Secret Gospel of Mark and the Gospel of John (the so-called Signs Gospel), portray such a wonder worker, user of magic, a magician or a Divine man. Only the Apostle Peter is also depicted in ancient art with a wand. Research by Lee M. Jefferson however, argued that the depiction of Jesus holding a wand is not an attempt to portray Jesus as a magician or magic user, but rather a continuity of biblical tradition of Moses's staff. It is also argued that early Christians were strong in their rejection of magic and anything related to it.

Another depiction, seen from the late 3rd century or early 4th century onwards, showed Jesus with a beard, and within a few decades can be very close to the conventional type that later emerged. This depiction has been said to draw variously on Imperial imagery, the type of the classical philosopher, and that of Zeus, leader of the Greek gods, or Jupiter, his Roman equivalent, and the protector of Rome. According to art historian Paul Zanker, the bearded type has long hair from the start, and a relatively long beard (contrasting with the short "classical" beard and hair always given to St Peter, and most other apostles); this depiction is specifically associated with "Charismatic" philosophers like Euphrates the Stoic, Dio of Prusa and Apollonius of Tyana, some of whom were claimed to perform miracles.

After the very earliest examples of c. 300, this depiction is mostly used for hieratic images of Jesus, and scenes from his life are more likely to use a beardless, youthful type. The tendency of older scholars such as Talbot Rice to see the beardless Jesus as associated with a "classical" artistic style and the bearded one as representing an "Eastern" one drawing from ancient Syria, Mesopotamia and Persia seems impossible to sustain, and does not feature in more recent analyses. Equally attempts to relate on a consistent basis the explanation for the type chosen in a particular work to the differing theological views of the time have been unsuccessful. From the 3rd century on, some Christian leaders, such as Clement of Alexandria, had recommended the wearing of beards by Christian men. The centre parting was also seen from early on, and was also associated with long-haired philosophers.

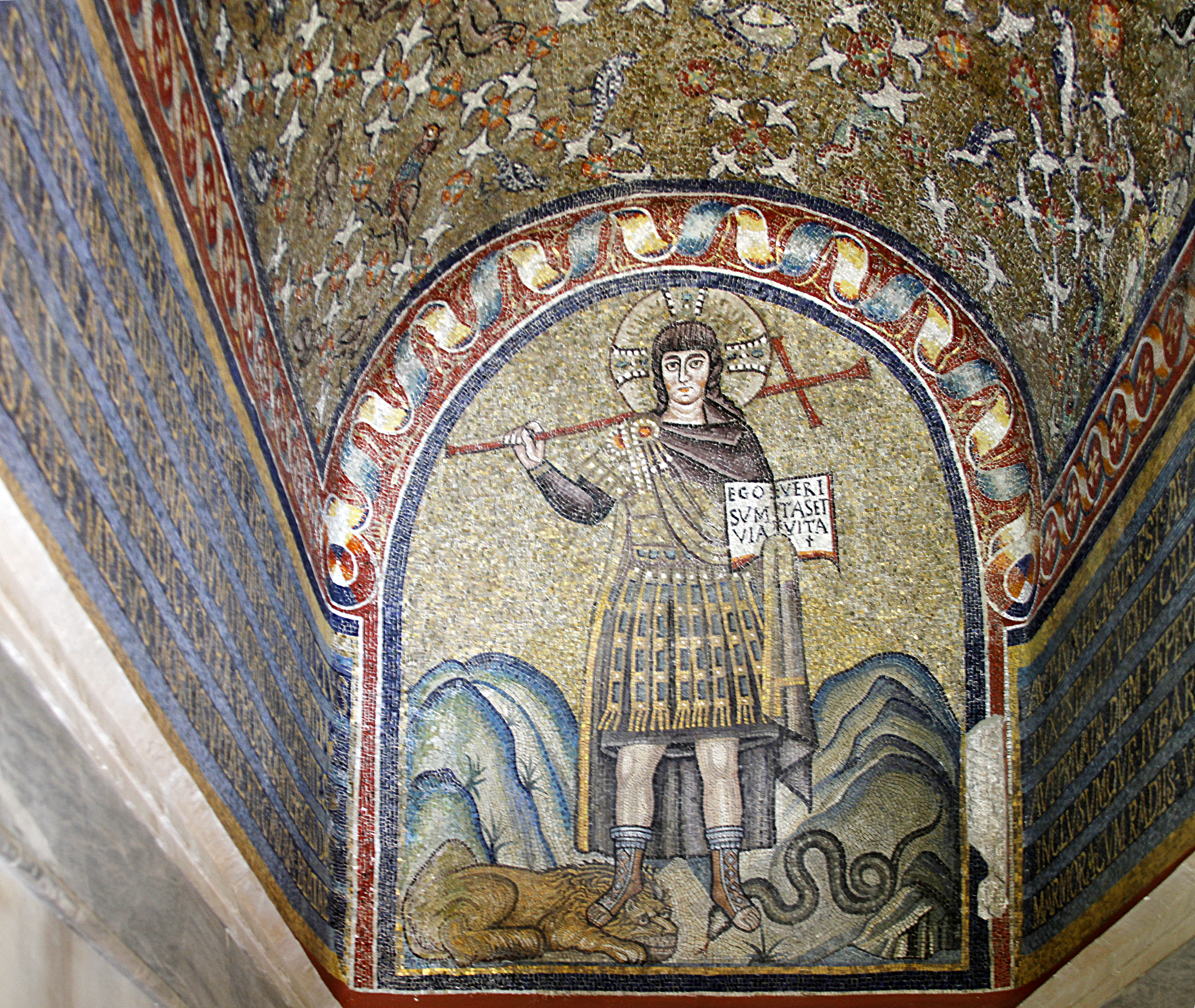
Christ as Emperor, wearing military dress, and crushing the serpent representing Satan. "I am the way and the truth and the life" (John 14:6) reads the inscription. Ravenna, after 500

=== After Constantine ===
From the middle of the 4th century, after Christianity was legalized by the Edict of Milan in 313, and gained Imperial favour, there was a new range of images of Christ the King, using either of the two physical types described above, but adopting the costume and often the poses of Imperial iconography. These developed into the various forms of Christ in Majesty. Some scholars reject the connection between the political events and developments in iconography, seeing the change as a purely theological one, resulting from the shift of the concept and title of Pantocrator ("Ruler of all") from God the Father (still not portrayed in art) to Christ, which was a development of the same period, perhaps led by Athanasius of Alexandria (d. 373).

Another depiction drew from classical images of philosophers, often shown as a youthful "intellectual wunderkind" in Roman sarcophagii; the Traditio Legis image initially uses this type. Gradually Jesus became shown as older, and during the 5th century the image with a beard and long hair, now with a cruciform halo, came to dominate, especially in the Eastern Empire. In the earliest large New Testament mosaic cycle, in Sant'Apollinare Nuovo, Ravenna (c. 520), Jesus is beardless through the period of his ministry until the scenes of the Passion, after which he is shown with a beard.

The Good Shepherd, now clearly identified as Christ, with halo and often rich robes, is still depicted, as on the apse mosaic in the church of Santi Cosma e Damiano in Rome, where the twelve apostles are depicted as twelve sheep below the imperial Jesus, or in the Mausoleum of Galla Placidia at Ravenna.

Once the bearded, long-haired Jesus became the conventional representation of Jesus, his facial features slowly began to be standardised, although this process took until at least the 6th century in the Eastern Church, and much longer in the West, where clean-shaven Jesuses are common until the 12th century, despite the influence of Byzantine art. But by the late Middle Ages the beard became almost universal and when Michelangelo showed a clean-shaven Apollo-like Christ in his Last Judgment fresco in the Sistine Chapel (1534–41) he came under persistent attack in the Counter-Reformation climate of Rome for this, as well as other things.

French scholar Paul Vignon has listed fifteen similarities, or "marks", between most of the icons of Jesus after this point, particularly in the icons of "Christ Pantocrator" ("The all-powerful Messiah"). He claims that these are due to the availability of the Image of Edessa (which he claims to be identical to the Shroud of Turin) to the artists, via Constantinople. Certainly images believed to have miraculous origins, or the Hodegetria, believed to be a portrait of Mary from the life by Saint Luke, were widely regarded as authoritative by the Early Medieval period and greatly influenced depictions. In Eastern Orthodoxy the form of images was, and largely is, regarded as revealed truth, with a status almost equal to scripture, and the aim of artists is to copy earlier images without originality, although the style and content of images does in fact change slightly over time.

As to the historical appearance of Jesus, in one possible translation of the apostle Paul's First Epistle to the Corinthians, Paul urges Christian men of first-century Corinth not to have long hair. An early commentary by Pelagius (c. AD 354 – c. AD 420/440) says, "Paul was complaining because men were fussing about their hair and women were flaunting their locks in church. Not only was this dishonoring to them, but it was also an incitement to fornication." Some have speculated that Jesus and/or Paul were Nazirites, a temporary vow during which hair is not cut. Critics emphasize that at the time, long hair on men was considered shameful as Paul states in I Corinthians 11:14. Jesus was a practicing Jew so presumably had a beard.

== Later periods ==
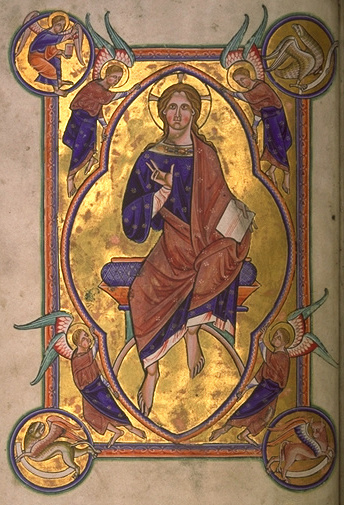
Christ in Majesty, still with no beard, from an English 12th-century illuminated manuscript.

By the 5th century depictions of the Passion began to appear, perhaps reflecting a change in the theological focus of the early Church. The 6th-century Rabbula Gospels includes some of the earliest surviving images of the crucifixion and resurrection. By the 6th century the bearded depiction of Jesus had become standard in the East, though the West, especially in northern Europe, continued to mix bearded and unbearded depictions for several centuries. The depiction with a longish face, long straight brown hair parted in the middle, and almond shaped eyes shows consistency from the 6th century to the present. Various legends developed which were believed to authenticate the historical accuracy of the standard depiction, such as the image of Edessa and later the Veil of Veronica. The earliest depiction of Jesus on a coin is a Byzantine gold solidus of the emperor Justinian II issued in 685 AD.

Partly to aid recognition of the scenes, narrative depictions of the Life of Christ focused increasingly on the events celebrated in the major feasts of the church calendar, and the events of the Passion, neglecting the miracles and other events of Jesus' public ministry, except for the raising of Lazarus, where the mummy-like wrapped body was shown standing upright, giving an unmistakable visual signature. A cruciform halo was worn only by Jesus (and the other persons of the Trinity), while plain halos distinguished Mary, the Apostles and other saints, helping the viewer to read increasingly populated scenes.

The period of Byzantine Iconoclasm acted as a barrier to developments in the East, but by the 9th century art was permitted again. The Transfiguration of Jesus was a major theme in the East and every Eastern Orthodox monk who had trained in icon painting had to prove his craft by painting an icon of the Transfiguration. However, while Western depictions increasingly aimed at realism, in Eastern icons a low regard for perspective and alterations in the size and proportion of an image aim to reach beyond earthly reality to a spiritual meaning.

The 13th century witnessed a turning point in the portrayal of the powerful Kyrios image of Jesus as a wonder worker in the West, as the Franciscans began to emphasize the humility of Jesus both at his birth and his death via the nativity scene as well as the crucifixion. The Franciscans approached both ends of this spectrum of emotions and as the joys of the Nativity of were added to the agony of crucifixion a whole new range of emotions were ushered in, with wide-ranging cultural impact on the image of Jesus for centuries thereafter.

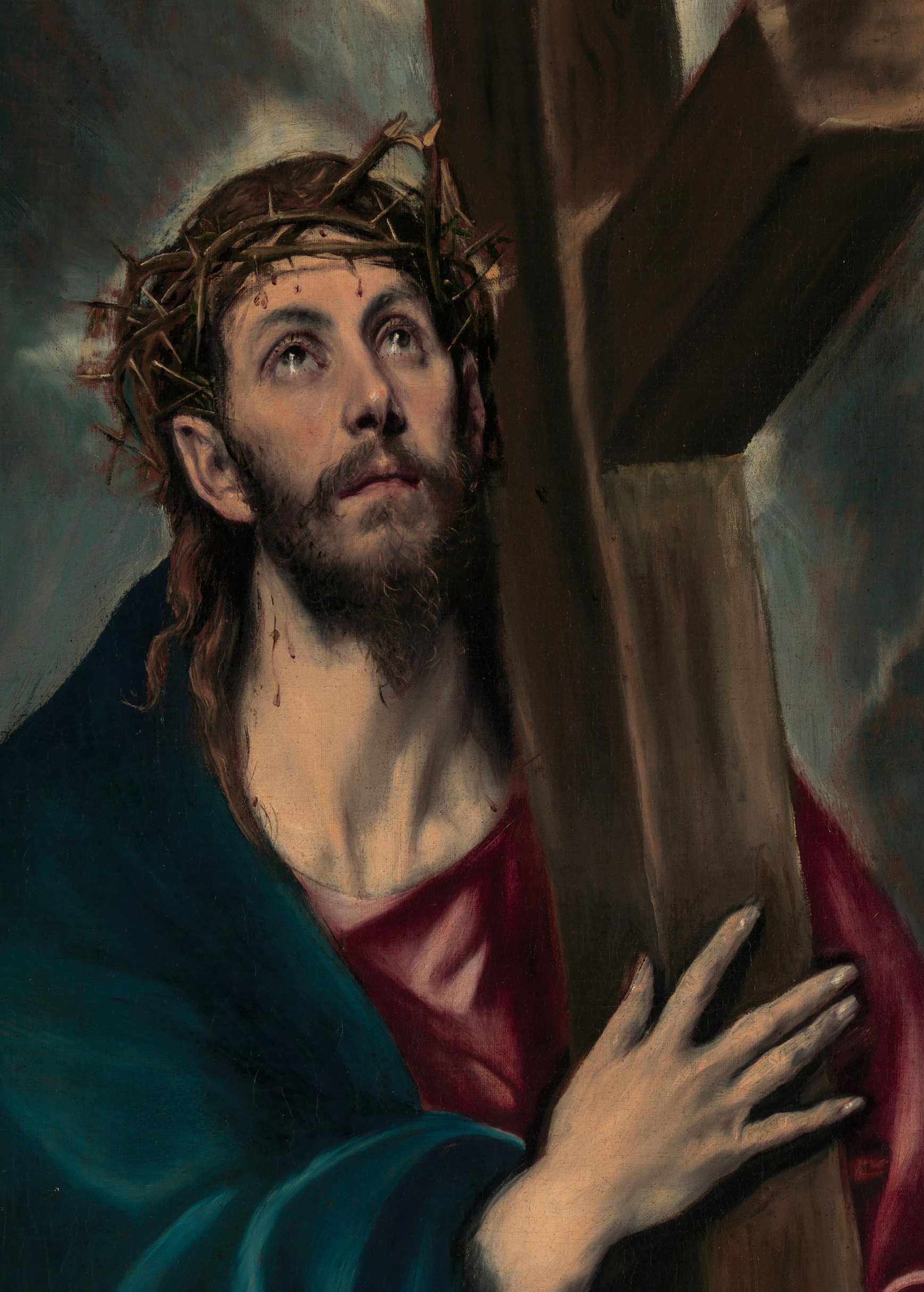
Christ Carrying the Cross, 1580, by El Greco, whose art reflects both his roots in Greek Orthodox traditions and the Catholic Counter-Reformation

After Giotto, Fra Angelico and others systematically developed uncluttered images that focused on the depiction of Jesus with an ideal human beauty, in works like Leonardo da Vinci's Last Supper, arguably the first High Renaissance painting. Images of Jesus now drew on classical sculpture, at least in some of their poses. However Michelangelo was considered to have gone much too far in his beardless Christ in his The Last Judgment fresco in the Sistine Chapel, which very clearly adapted classical sculptures of Apollo, and this path was rarely followed by other artists.

The High Renaissance was contemporary with the start of the Protestant Reformation which, especially in its first decades, violently objected to almost all public religious images as idolatrous, and vast numbers were destroyed. Gradually images of Jesus became acceptable to most Protestants in various contexts, especially in narrative contexts, as book illustrations and prints, and later in larger paintings. Protestant art continued the now-standard depiction of the physical appearance of Jesus. Meanwhile, the Catholic Counter-Reformation re-affirmed the importance of art in assisting the devotions of the faithful, and encouraged the production of new images of or including Jesus in enormous numbers, also continuing to use the standard depiction.

During the 17th century, some writers, such as Thomas Browne in his Pseudodoxia Epidemica criticized depictions of Jesus with long hair. Although some scholars believed that Jesus wore long hair because he was a Nazarite and therefore could not cut his hair, Browne argues "that our Saviour was a Nazarite after this kind, we have no reason to determine; for he drank Wine, and was therefore called by the Pharisees, a Wine-bibber; he approached also the dead, as when he raised from death Lazarus, and the daughter of Jairus."

By the end of the 19th century, new reports of miraculous images of Jesus had appeared and continue to receive significant attention, e.g. Secondo Pia's 1898 photograph of the Shroud of Turin, one of the most controversial artifacts in history, which during its May 2010 exposition it was visited by over 2 million people. Another 20th-century depiction of Jesus, namely the Divine Mercy image based on Faustina Kowalska's reported vision has over 100 million followers.

A scene from the documentary film Super Size Me showed American children being unable to identify a common depiction of Jesus, despite recognizing other figures like George Washington and Ronald McDonald.

== Film ==
The cinematic depiction of Jesus developed alongside the evolution of film itself. The earliest productions, made between 1897 and the 1910s, consisted largely of short Passion plays and tableaux inspired by Christian iconography and stage performances. Among the first were Albert Kirchner's Passion du Christ (1897), Georges Hatot and Louis Lumière's La Vie et la Passion de Jésus-Christ (1898), Henry C. Vincent's The Passion Play of Oberammergau (1898), based on the play Oberammergau Passion Play, Georges Méliès' Christ Walking on the Water (1899), Ferdinand Zecca and Lucien Nonguet's Vie et Passion du Christ (1903–1907), Alice Guy-Blaché's The Birth, the Life and the Death of Christ (1906), André Calmettes and Armand Bour's Le Baiser de Judas (1908), Louis Feuillade's Le Christ en croix (1910), Sidney Olcott's From the Manger to the Cross (1912), and Giulio Antamoro's Christus (1916).

As silent cinema matured, Jesus increasingly appeared within ambitious historical epics that combined biblical narrative with the emerging language of feature-length filmmaking. Thomas H. Ince's Civilization presented Christ as a pacifist ideal during the First World War; D. W. Griffith incorporated the Passion into the parallel narrative structure of Intolerance (1916); Carl Theodor Dreyer's Leaves from Satan's Book (1920) portrayed Satan's recurring attempts to corrupt humanity, including the betrayal of Jesus; Robert Wiene's I.N.R.I. framed the Passion within a modern story of persecution; and Cecil B. DeMille's The King of Kings established one of the most influential screen portrayals of Jesus of the silent era.

The arrival of sound cinema allowed for more elaborate and varied portrayals of Jesus. Julien Duvivier's Golgotha (1935) was one of the earliest major sound films devoted directly to the Passion. William Wyler's Ben-Hur portrayed Jesus indirectly, largely withholding his face and presenting him through the experience of Judah Ben-Hur. Nicholas Ray's King of Kings and George Stevens' The Greatest Story Ever Told (1965) offered large-scale Hollywood dramatizations of the Gospel narrative. By contrast, Pier Paolo Pasolini's The Gospel According to St. Matthew (1964), filmed in black and white with non-professional actors, adopted a more austere visual style and remained closely aligned with the text of the Gospel of Matthew.

From the 1970s onward, filmmakers explored increasingly diverse interpretations of Jesus. Norman Jewison's Jesus Christ Superstar (1973) adapted the rock opera as a musical retelling of the Passion, while Roberto Rossellini's The Messiah emphasized the historical and human dimensions of Jesus' ministry. Franco Zeffirelli's television production Jesus of Nazareth (1977) presented an extensive dramatization of his life and became one of the most widely circulated screen portrayals of Christ. Martin Scorsese's The Last Temptation of Christ (1988) generated controversy through its depiction of Jesus' doubts, fears and imagined human life, whereas Denys Arcand's Jesus of Montreal (1989) transposed the Passion narrative into contemporary Quebec. Derek W. Hayes and Stanislav Sokolov's animated film The Miracle Maker combined stop-motion animation with traditionally drawn sequences; Mel Gibson's The Passion of the Christ (2004) concentrated on the final hours of Jesus and emphasized the physical violence of the Passion; and Christopher Spencer's Son of God (2014) returned to a more conventional dramatization of the Gospel narrative for contemporary audiences.

The depiction of Jesus in cinema has been the subject of several book-length studies, including Lloyd Baugh's Imaging the Divine: Jesus and Christ-Figures in Film (1997), W. Barnes Tatum's Jesus at the Movies: A Guide to the First Hundred Years (1997), Adele Reinhartz's Jesus of Hollywood (2007), Peter Malone's Screen Jesus: Portrayals of Christ in Television and Film (2012), and Gustavo Bernstein's The Face of Christ in Cinema: A Cinematic Reading of the Gospel (2019).

== Conventional depictions ==
Conventional depictions of Christ developed in medieval art include the narrative scenes of the Life of Christ, and many other conventional depictions:

Common narrative scenes from the Life of Christ in art include:

- Nativity of Jesus in art
- Adoration of the Shepherds
- Adoration of the Magi
- Finding in the Temple
- Baptism of Jesus
- Crucifixion of Jesus
- Descent from the Cross
- Last Judgement

Devotional images include:

- Madonna and child
- Christ in Majesty
- Christ Pantokrator
- Sacred Heart
- Pietà (mother and dead son)
- Lamb of God
- Man of sorrows
- Pensive Christ

== Range of depictions ==
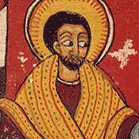
An 18th-century Ethiopian image of Jesus

Certain local traditions have maintained different depictions, sometimes reflecting local racial characteristics, as do the Catholic and Orthodox depictions. The Coptic Church of Egypt separated in the 5th century, and has a distinctive depiction of Jesus, consistent with Coptic art. The Ethiopian Church, also Coptic, developed on Coptic traditions, but shows Jesus and all Biblical figures with the Ethiopian appearance of its members. Other traditions in China, Central Asia and elsewhere generally depict the appearance of Jesus as that of the local population (see the gallery below).

In modern times such variation has become more common, but images following the traditional depiction in both physical appearance and clothing are still dominant, perhaps surprisingly so. In Europe, local ethnic tendencies in depictions of Jesus can be seen, for example in Spanish, German, or Early Netherlandish painting, but almost always surrounding figures are still more strongly characterised. For example, the Virgin Mary, after the vision reported by Bridget of Sweden, was often shown with blonde hair, but Christ's is very rarely paler than a light brown.

Some medieval Western depictions, usually of the Meeting at Emmaus, where his disciples do not recognise him at first (Luke.24.13–32), showed Jesus wearing a Jewish hat.

The CGI model created in 2001 depicted Jesus' skin color as being darker and more olive-colored than his traditional depictions in Western art.

In 2001, the television series Son of God used one of three first-century Jewish skulls from a leading department of forensic science in Israel to depict Jesus in a new way. A face was constructed using forensic anthropology by Richard Neave, a retired medical artist from the Unit of Art in Medicine at the University of Manchester. The face that Neave constructed suggested that Jesus would have had a broad face and large nose, and differed significantly from the traditional depictions of Jesus in renaissance art. Additional information about Jesus' skin color and hair was provided by Mark Goodacre, a New Testament scholar and professor at Duke University.

Using third-century images from a synagogue—the earliest pictures of Jewish people—Goodacre proposed that Jesus' skin color would have been darker and swarthier than his traditional Western image. He also suggested that he would have had short, curly hair and a short cropped beard. Although entirely speculative as the face of Jesus, the result of the study determined that Jesus' skin would have been more olive-colored than white or black, and that he would have looked like a typical Galilean Semite. Among the points made was that the Bible records that Jesus's disciple Judas had to point him out to those arresting him in Gethsemane. The implied argument is that if Jesus's physical appearance had differed markedly from his disciples, then he would have been relatively easy to identify.

== Miraculous images of Jesus ==
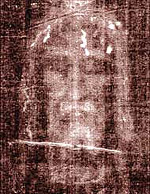
Secondo Pia's negative of his 1898 photo of the Shroud of Turin. Many Christians believe this image to be the Holy Face of Jesus.

There are, however, some images which have been claimed to realistically show how Jesus looked. One early tradition, recorded by Eusebius of Caesarea, says that Jesus once washed his face with water and then dried it with a cloth, leaving an image of his face imprinted on the cloth. This was sent by him to King Abgarus of Edessa, who had sent a messenger asking Jesus to come and heal him of his disease. This image, called the Mandylion or Image of Edessa, appears in history in around 525. Numerous replicas of this "image not made by human hands" remain in circulation. There are also icon compositions of Jesus and Mary that are traditionally believed by many Orthodox to have originated in paintings by Luke the Evangelist.

A currently familiar depiction is that on the Shroud of Turin, whose records go back to 1353. Controversy surrounds the shroud and its exact origin remains subject to debate. The Shroud of Turin is respected by Christians of several traditions, including Baptists, Catholics, Lutherans, Methodists, Orthodox, Pentecostals, and Presbyterians. It is one of the Catholic devotions approved by the Holy See, that to the Holy Face of Jesus, now uses the image of the face on the shroud as it appeared in the negative of the photograph taken by amateur photographer Secondo Pia in 1898. The image cannot be clearly seen on the shroud itself with the naked eye, and it surprised Pia to the extent that he said he almost dropped and broke the photographic plate when he first saw the developed negative image on it in the evening of 28 May 1898.

Before 1898, devotion to the Holy Face of Jesus used an image based on the Veil of Veronica, where legend recounts that Veronica from Jerusalem encountered Jesus along the Via Dolorosa on the way to Calvary. When she paused to wipe the sweat from Jesus's face with her veil, the image was imprinted on the cloth. The establishment of these images as Catholic devotions traces back to Sister Marie of St Peter and the Venerable Leo Dupont who started and promoted them from 1844 to 1874 in Tours France, and Sister Maria Pierina De Micheli who associated the image from the Shroud of Turin with the devotion in 1936 in Milan Italy.

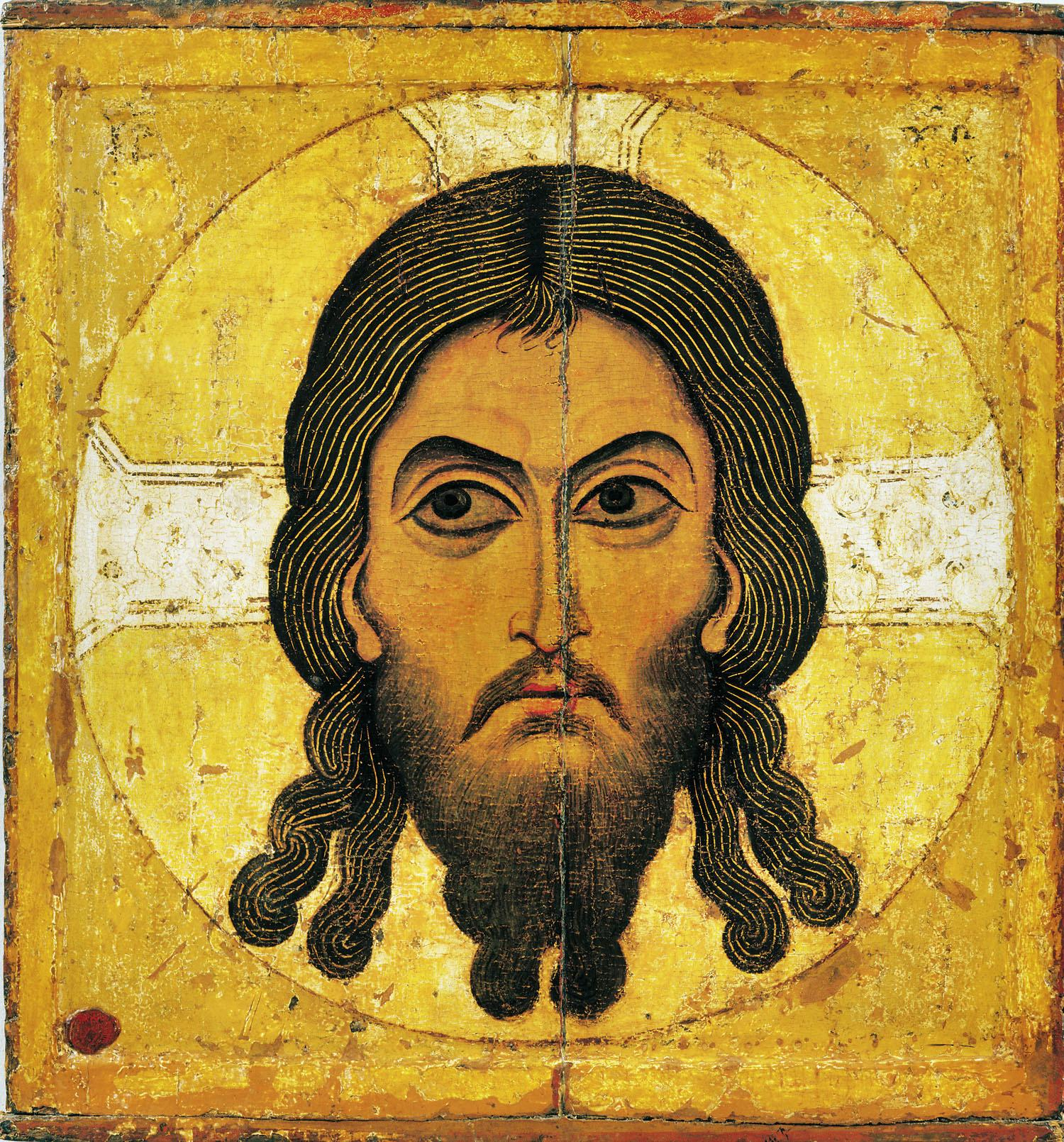
"The Saviour Not Made by Hands", a Novgorodian icon from c. 1100 based on a Byzantine model

A very popular 20th-century depiction among Roman Catholics and Anglicans is the Divine Mercy image, which was approved by Pope John Paul II in April 2000. The Divine Mercy depiction is formally used in celebrations of Divine Mercy Sunday and is venerated by over 100 million Catholics who follow the devotion. The image is not part of Acheiropoieta in that it has been depicted by modern artists, but the pattern of the image is said to have been miraculously shown to Saint Faustina Kowalska in a vision of Jesus in 1931 in Płock, Poland.

Faustina wrote in her diary that Jesus appeared to her and asked her to "Paint an image according to the pattern you see". Faustina eventually found an artist (Eugene Kazimierowski) to depict the Divine Mercy image of Jesus with his right hand raised in a sign of blessing and the left hand touching the garment near his breast, with two large rays, one red, the other white emanating from near his heart. After Faustina's death, a number of other artists painted the image, with the depiction by Adolf Hyla being among the most reproduced.

Warner Sallman stated that The Head of Christ was the result of a "miraculous vision that he received late one night", proclaiming that "the answer came at 2 A.M., January 1924" as "a vision in response to my prayer to God in a despairing situation." The Head of Christ is venerated in the Coptic Orthodox Church, after twelve-year-old Isaac Ayoub, who diagnosed with cancer, saw the eyes of Jesus in the painting shedding tears; Fr. Ishaq Soliman of St. Mark's Coptic Church in Houston, on the same day, "testified to the miracles" and on the next day, "Dr. Atef Rizkalla, the family physician, examined the youth and certified that there were no traces of leukemia".

With episcopal approval from Bishop Tadros of Port Said and Bishop Yuhanna of Cairo, "Sallman's Head of Christ was exhibited in the Coptic Church", with "more than fifty thousand people" visiting the church to see it. In addition, several religious magazines have explained the "power of Sallman's picture" by documenting occurrences such as headhunters letting go of a businessman and fleeing after seeing the image, a "thief who aborted his misdeed when he saw the Head of Christ on a living room wall", and deathbed conversions of non-believers to Christianity. As an extraordinarily successful work of Christian popular devotional art, it had been reproduced over half a billion times worldwide by the end of the 20th century.

== Examples ==
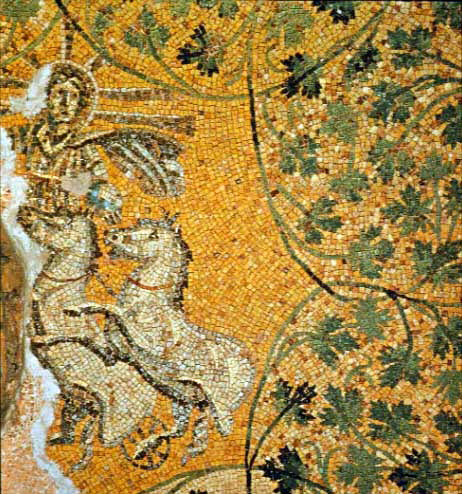
A representation of Jesus as Sol Invictus. Mosaic of the 3rd century on the Tomb of the Julii under St. Peter's Basilica.

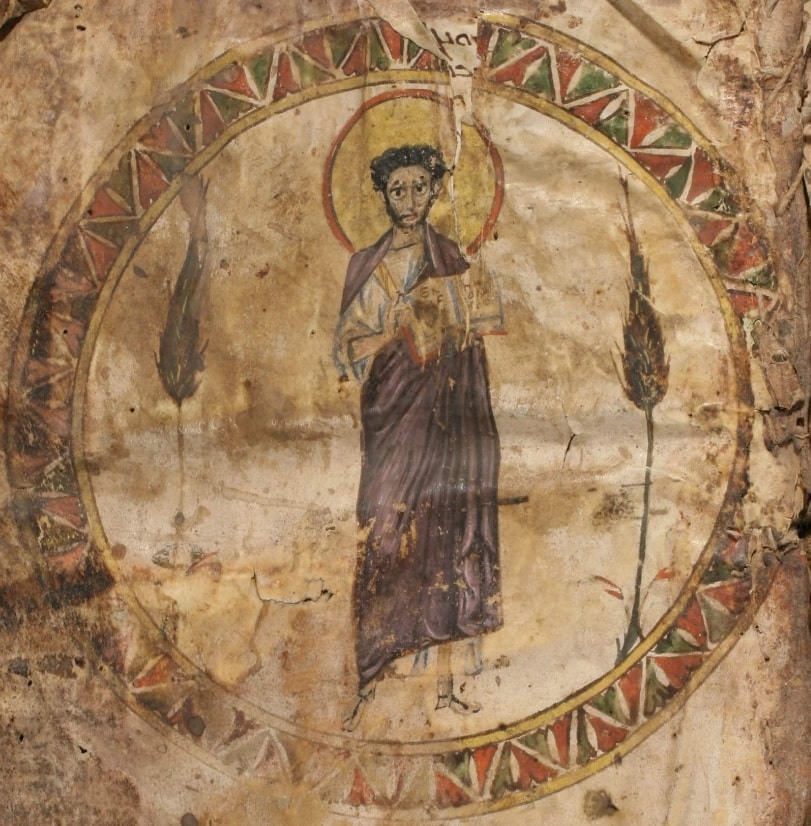
Christ holding Gospel of John, miniature in Syriac manuscript DIYR 339, a 6th-century gospel book from St. Mary Church, Diyarbakır

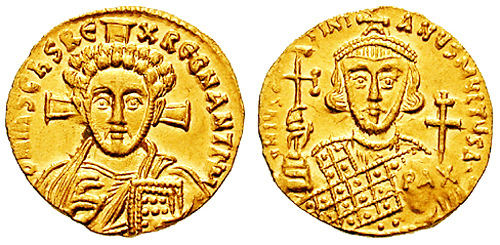
Jesus depicted on an early 8th-century Byzantine coin. After the Byzantine iconoclasm all coins had Christ on them.

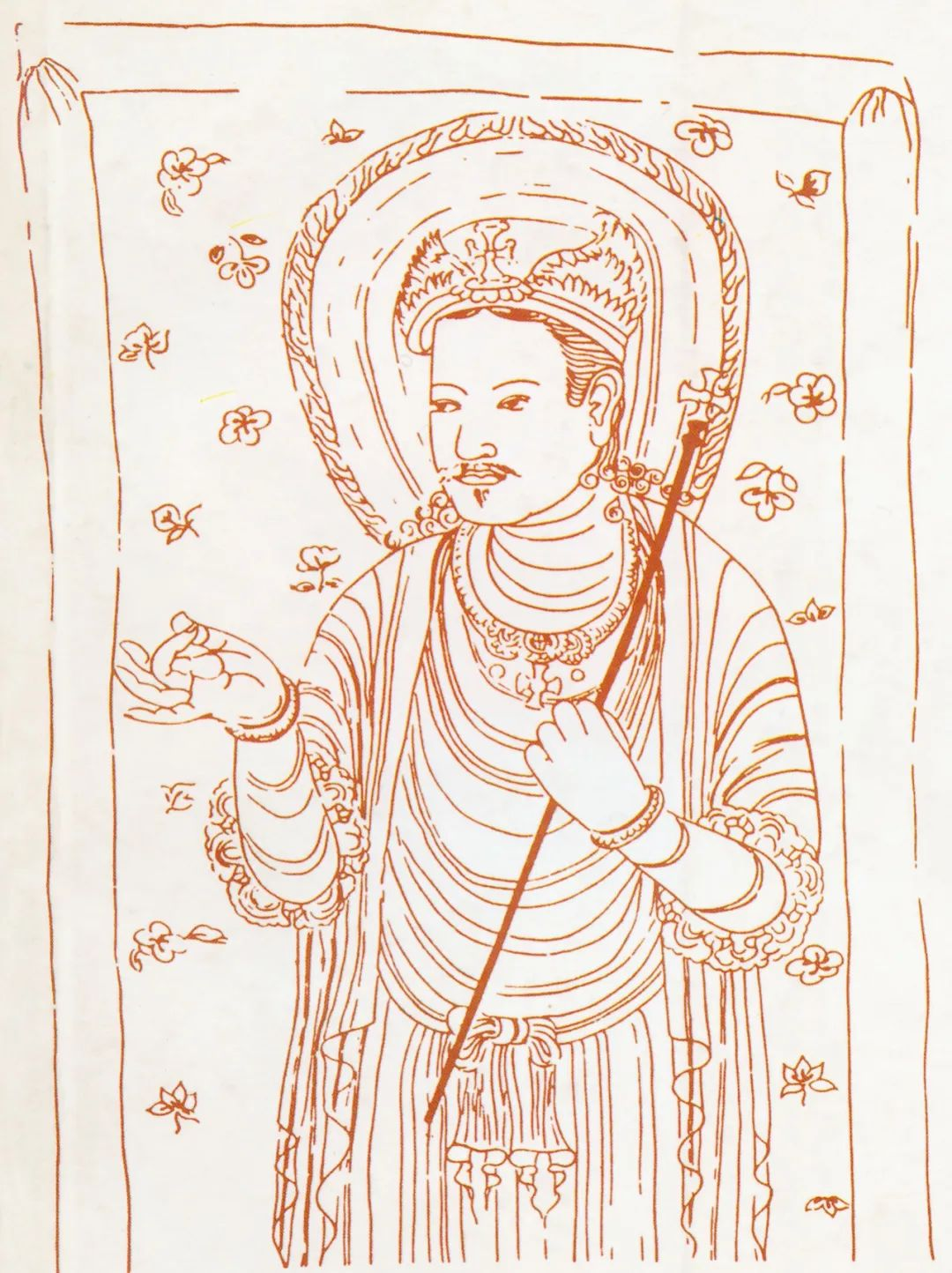
Restored Church of the East painting of Jesus Christ, 9th century

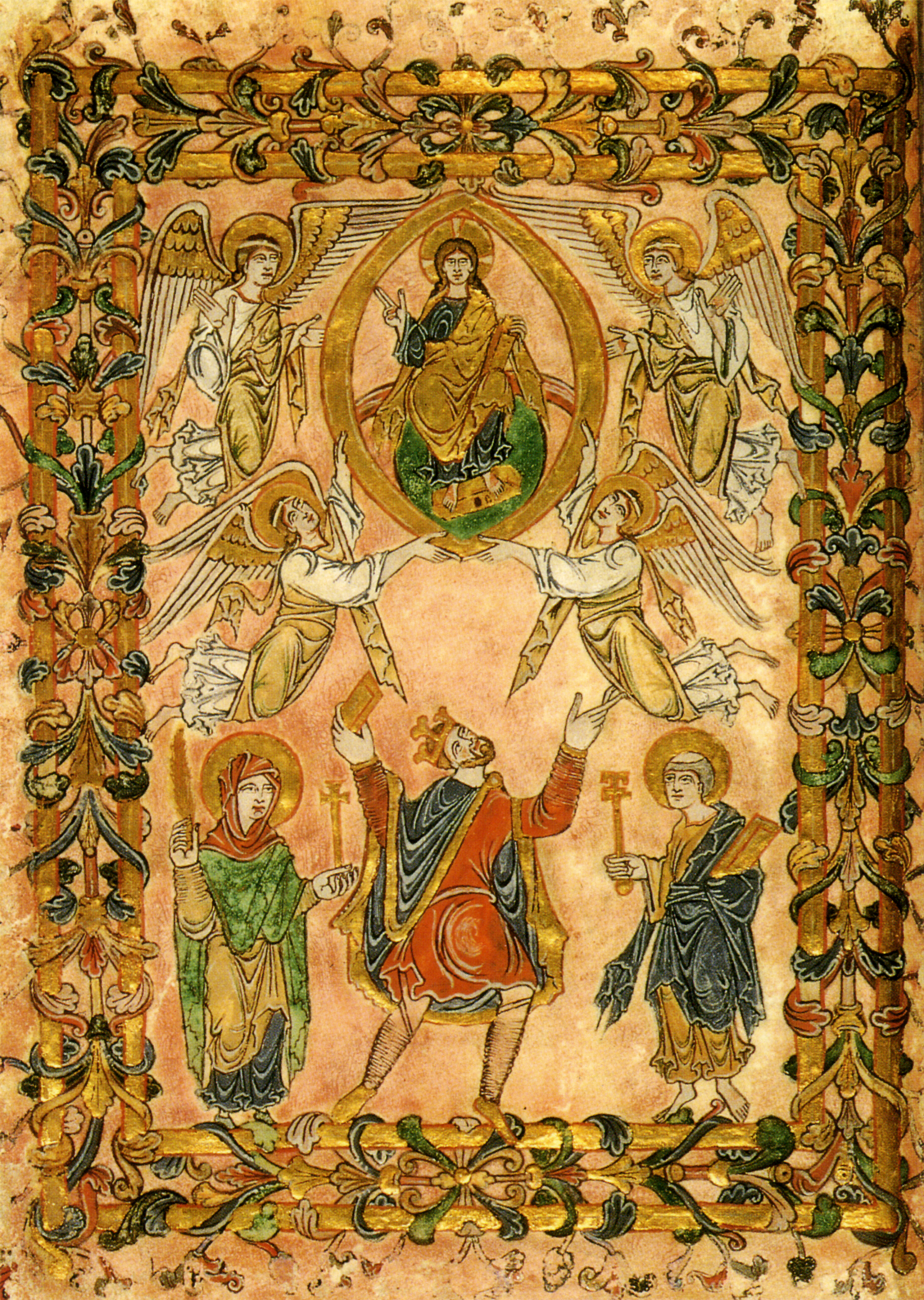
A beardless Christ in the Anglo-Saxon New Minster Charter, Winchester, mid-10th century

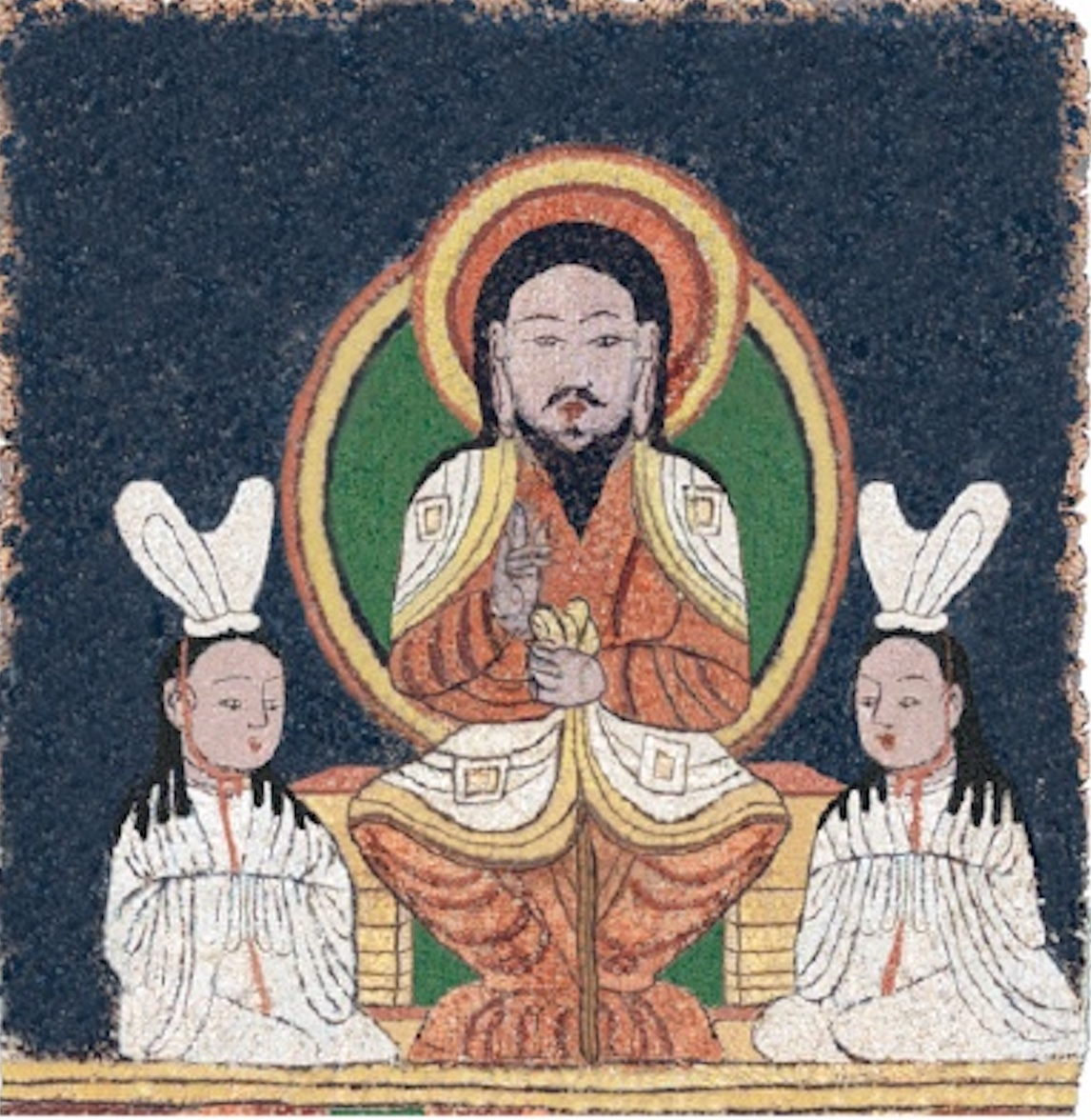
Reconstruction of the enthroned Jesus (Yišō) image on a Manichaean temple banner from c. 10th-century Qocho (East Central Asia)

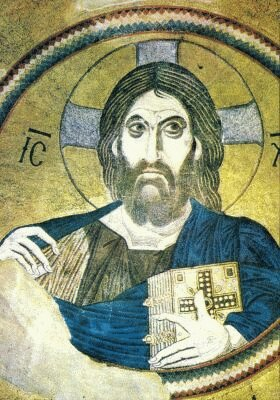
11th-century Christ Pantocrator with the halo in a cross form, used throughout the Middle Ages. Characteristically, he is portrayed as similar in features and skin tone to the culture of the artist.

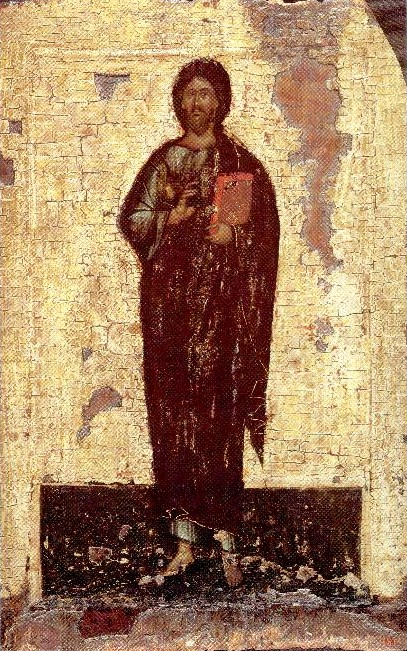
"Christ All Mercy" Eastern Orthodox icon

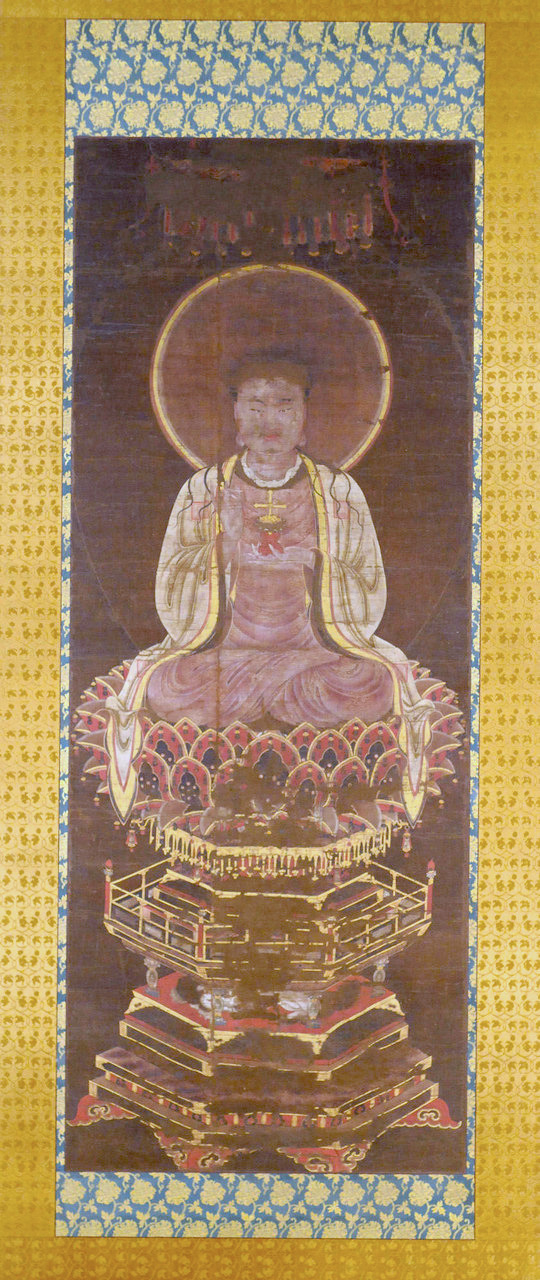
Manichaean Painting of the Buddha Jesus, a 12th- or 13th-century Chinese hanging scroll depicting Jesus Christ as the Manichaean prophet Yišō

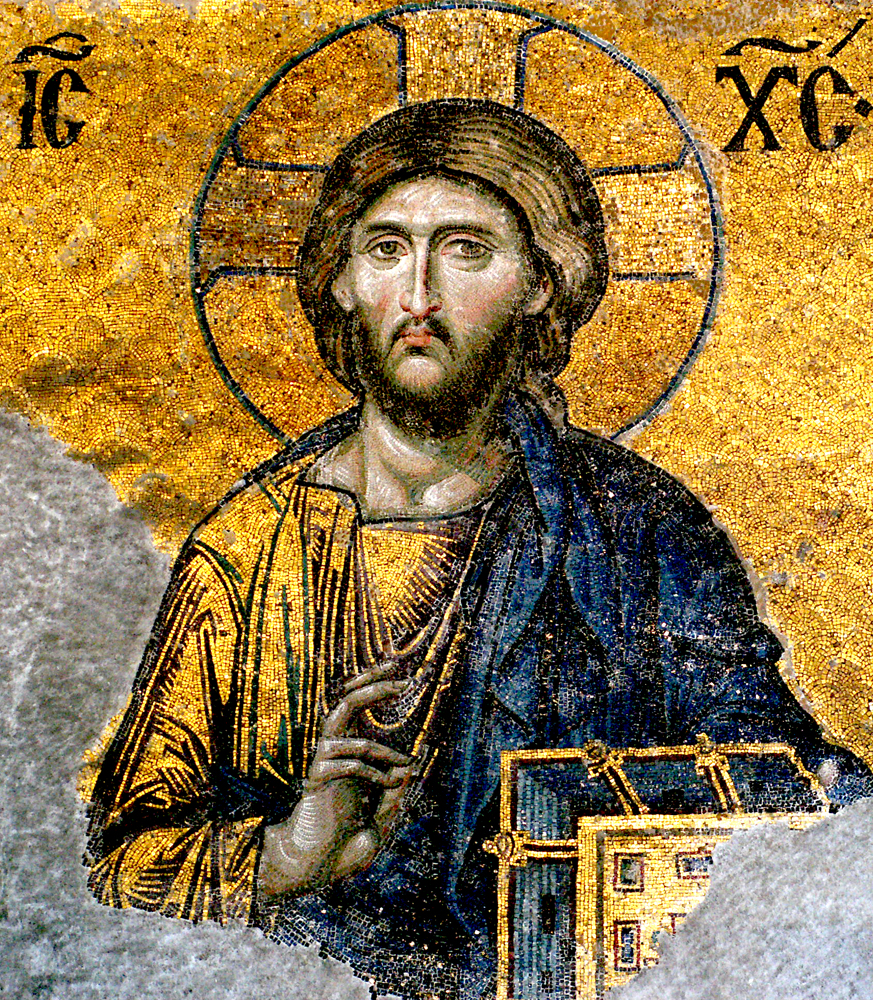
Jesus Christ Pantocrator – 13th-century mosaic from Hagia Sophia

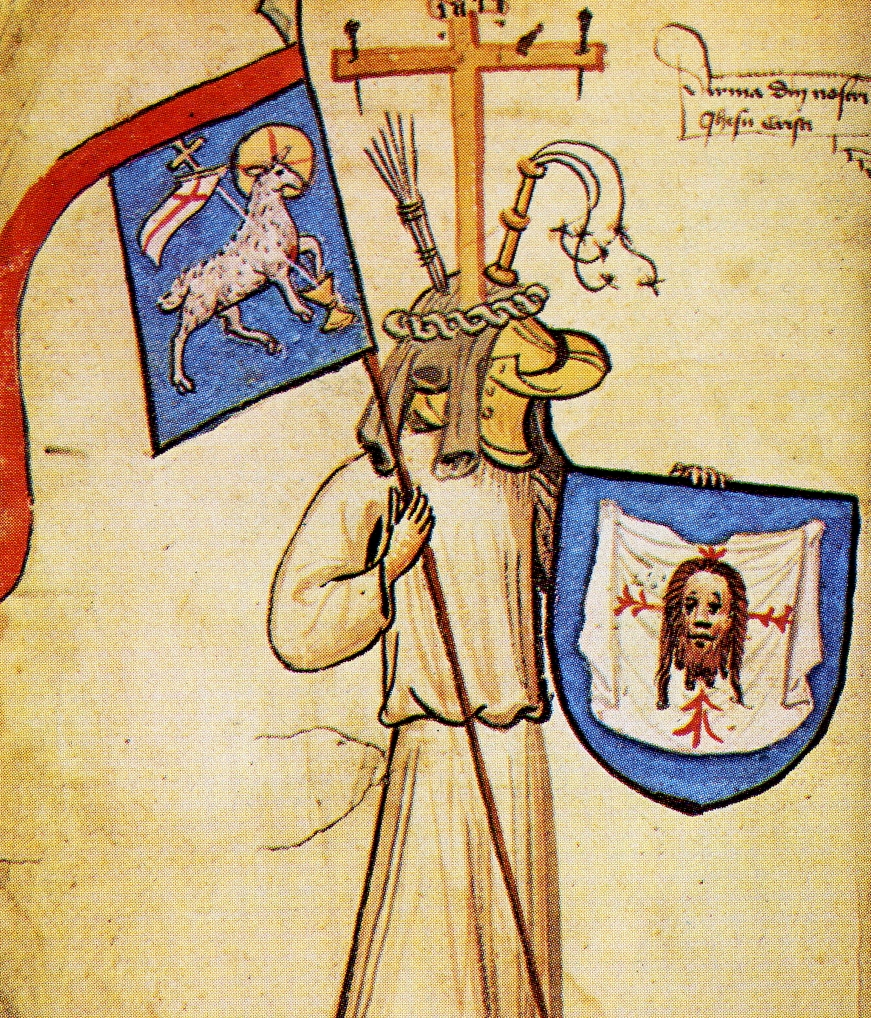
An unusual 15th-century image of Jesus as a medieval knight bearing an attributed coat of arms based on the Veil of Veronica

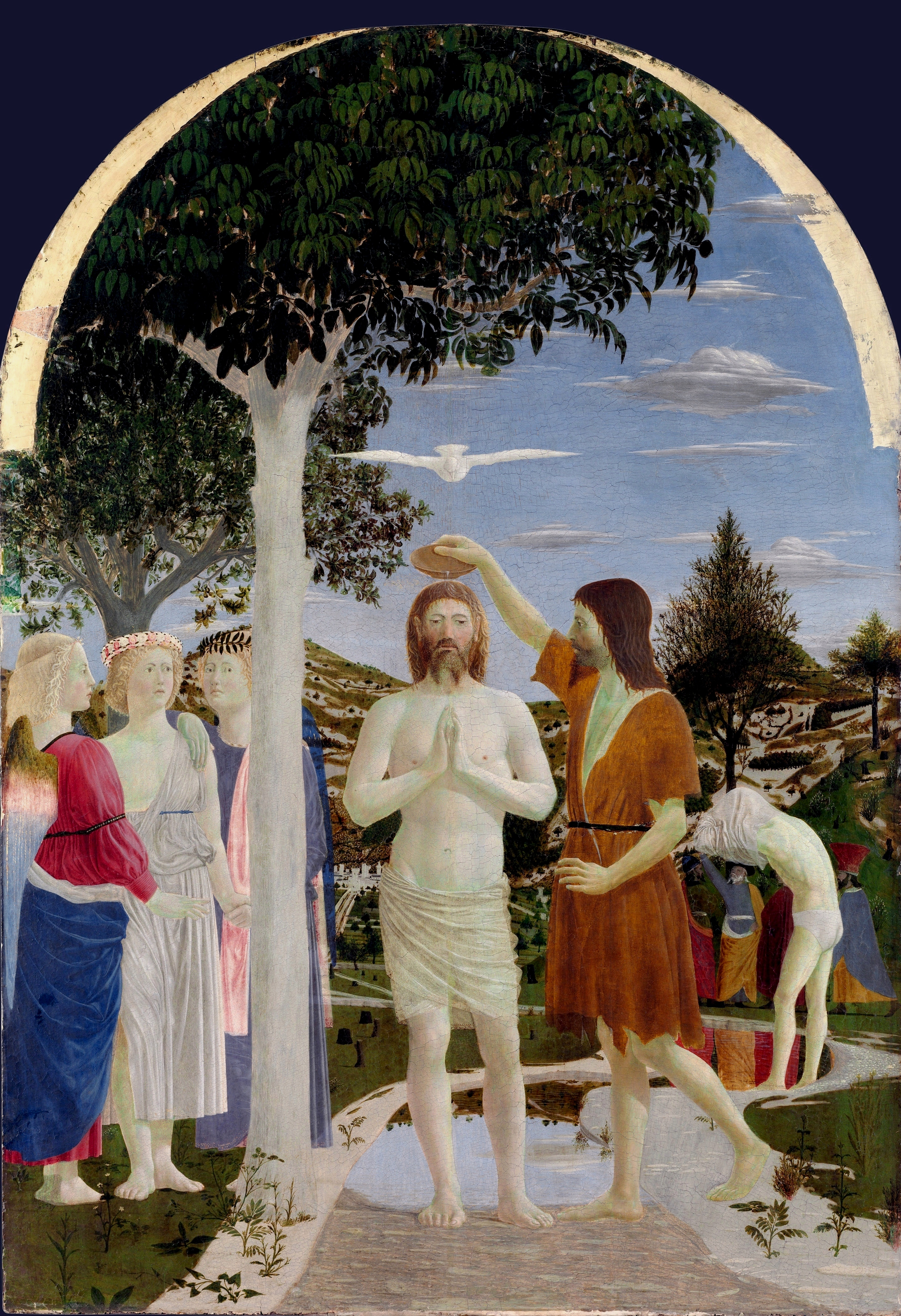
The Baptism of Jesus Christ, by Piero della Francesca, c. 1448-1450

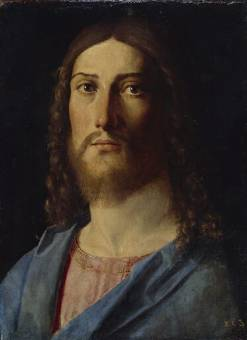
Portrait of Jesus by Cima da Conegliano (1459–1517)

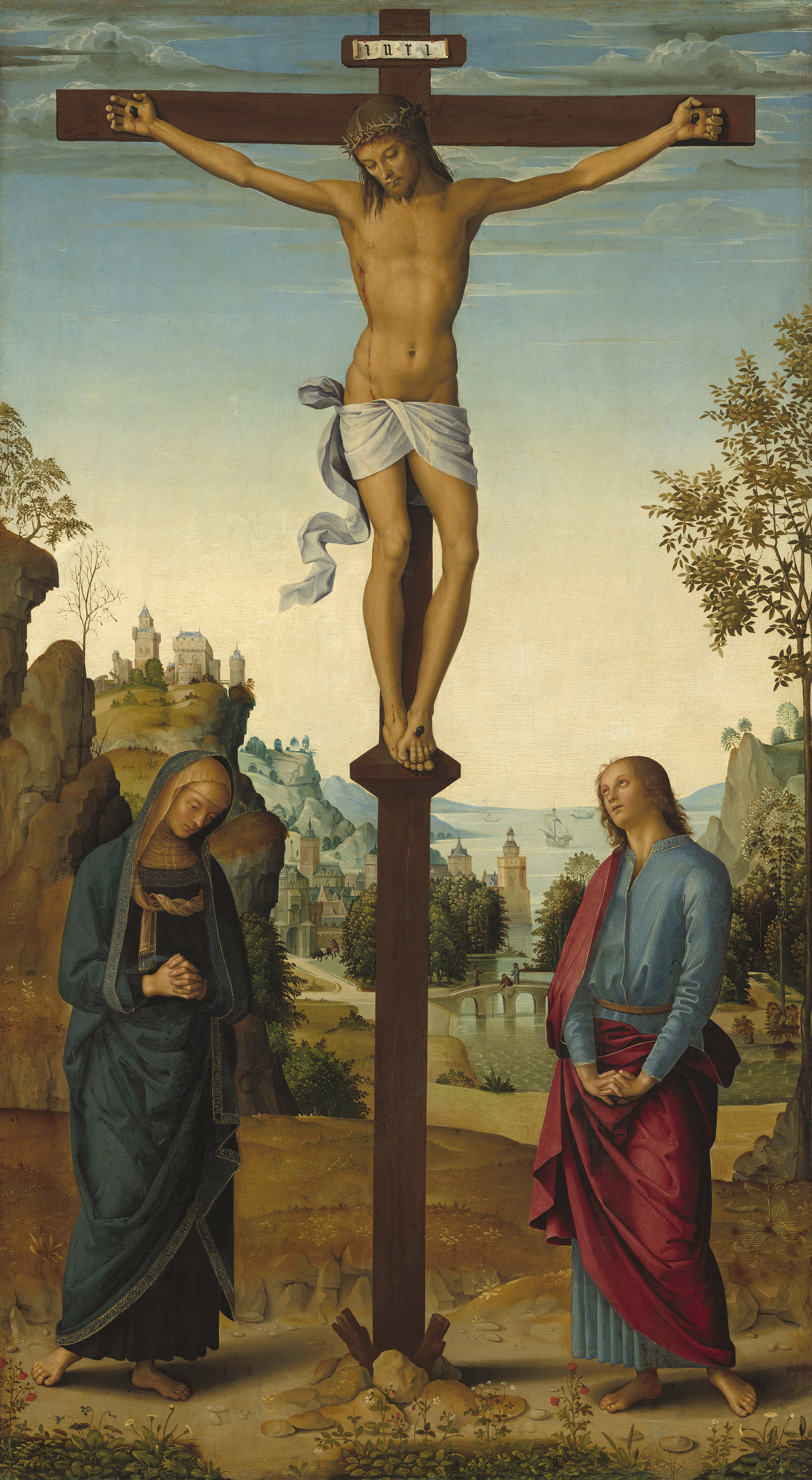
Pietro Perugino's depiction of the Crucifixion as Stabat Mater, 1482

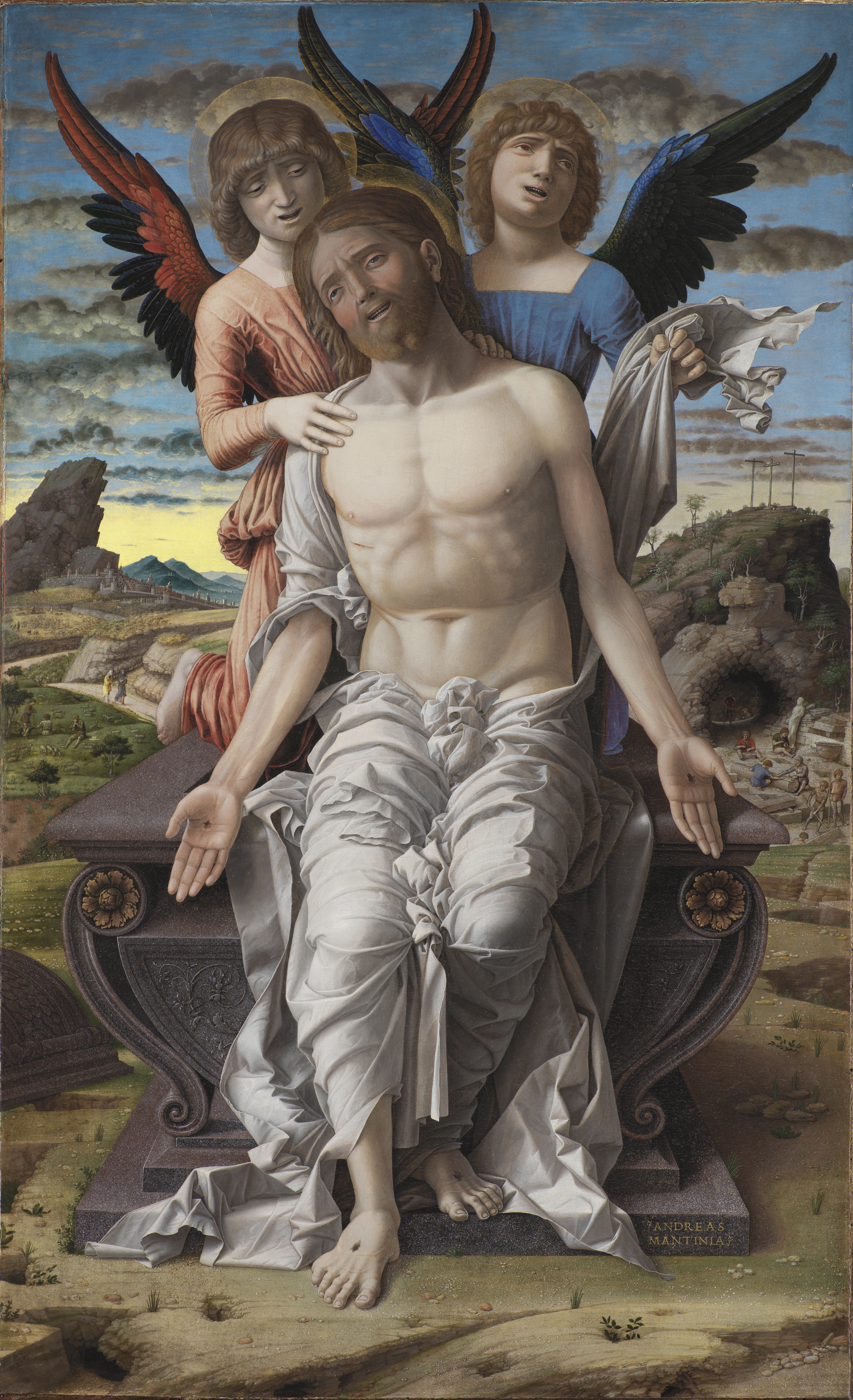
Christ as the Suffering Redeemeer, c. 1488–1500, by Andrea Mantegna

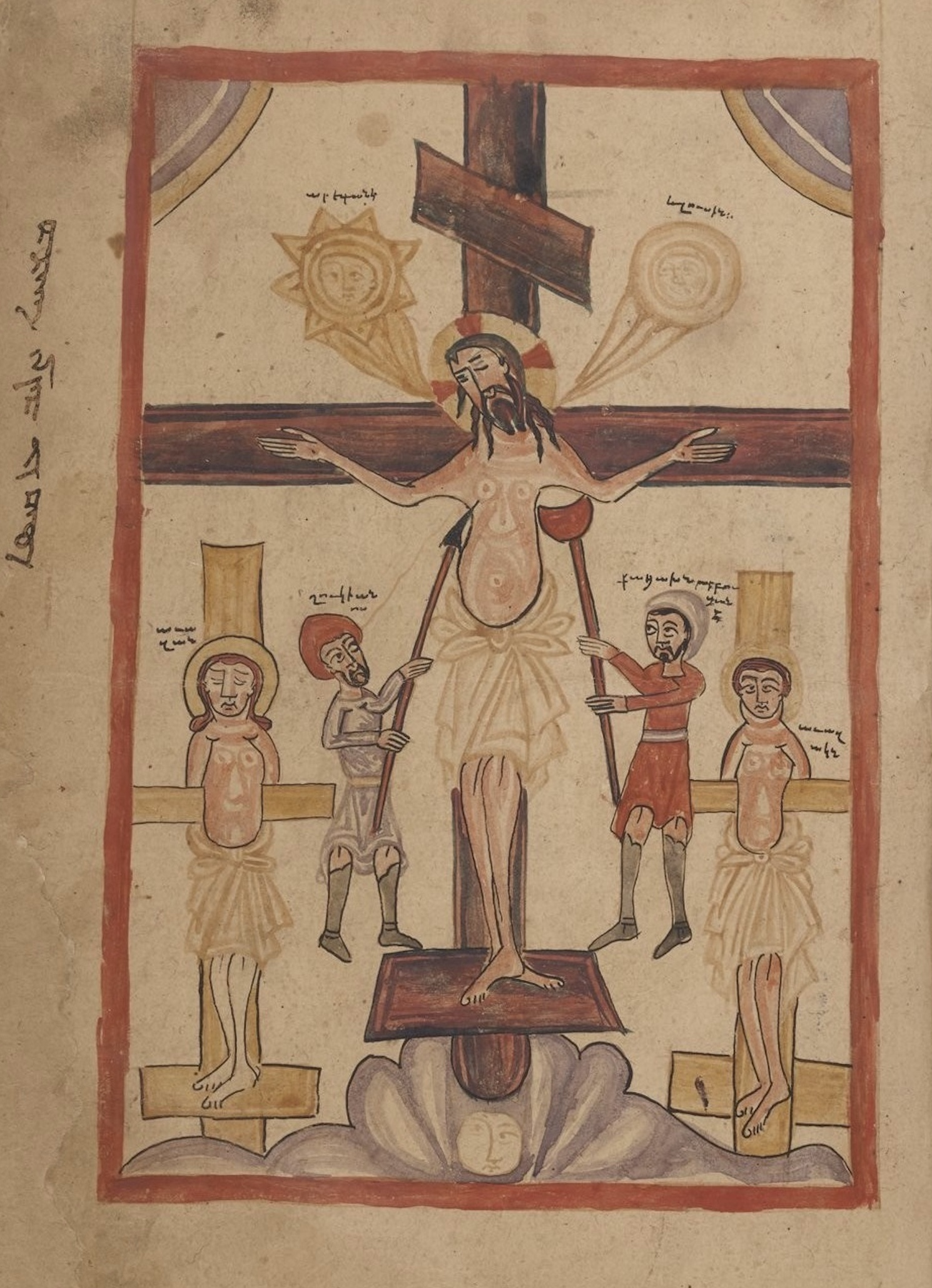
A Nestorian "Crucifixion of Jesus", illustration from the Nestorian Evangelion, 16th century

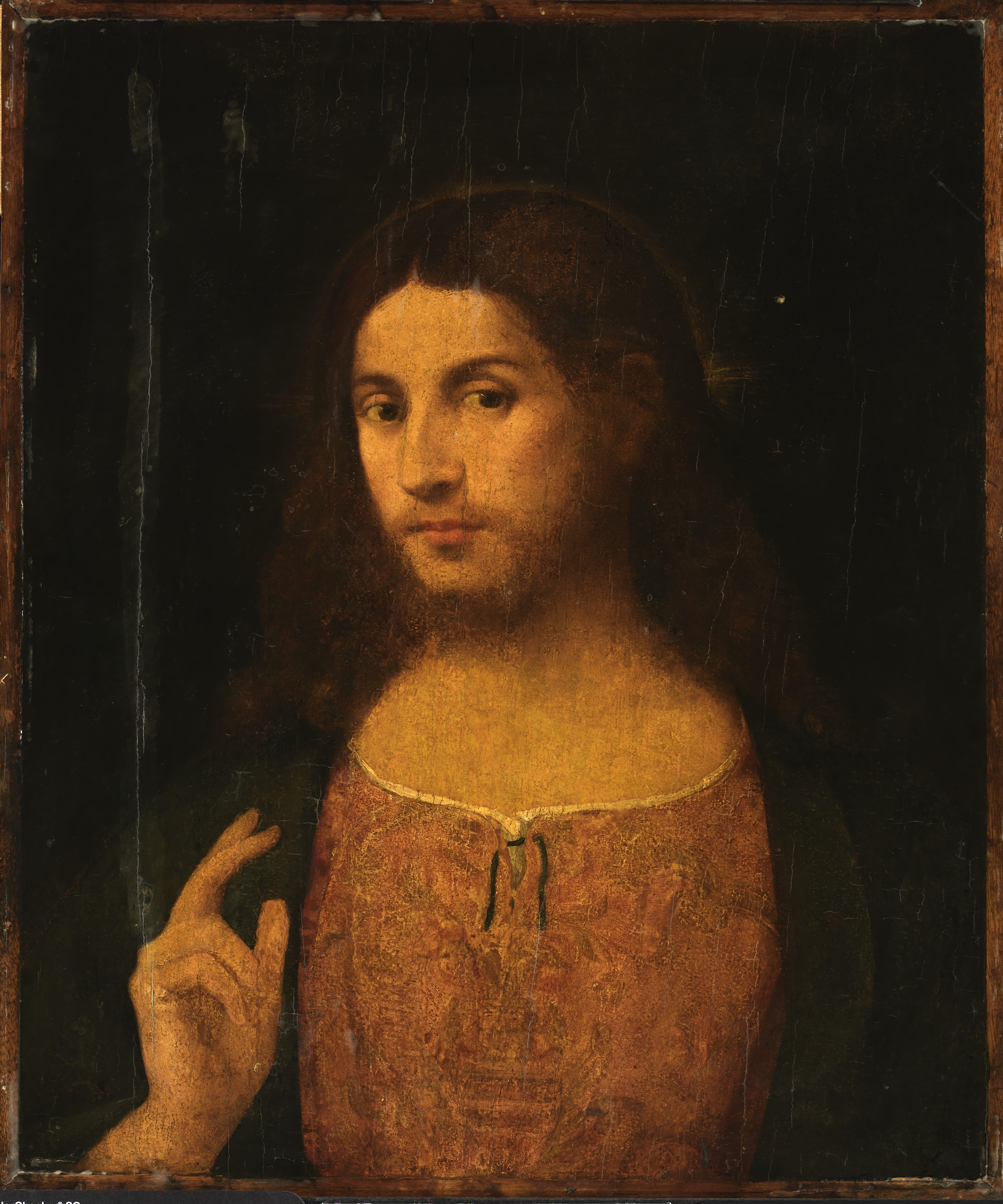
Palma il Vecchio, Head of Christ, 16th century, Italy

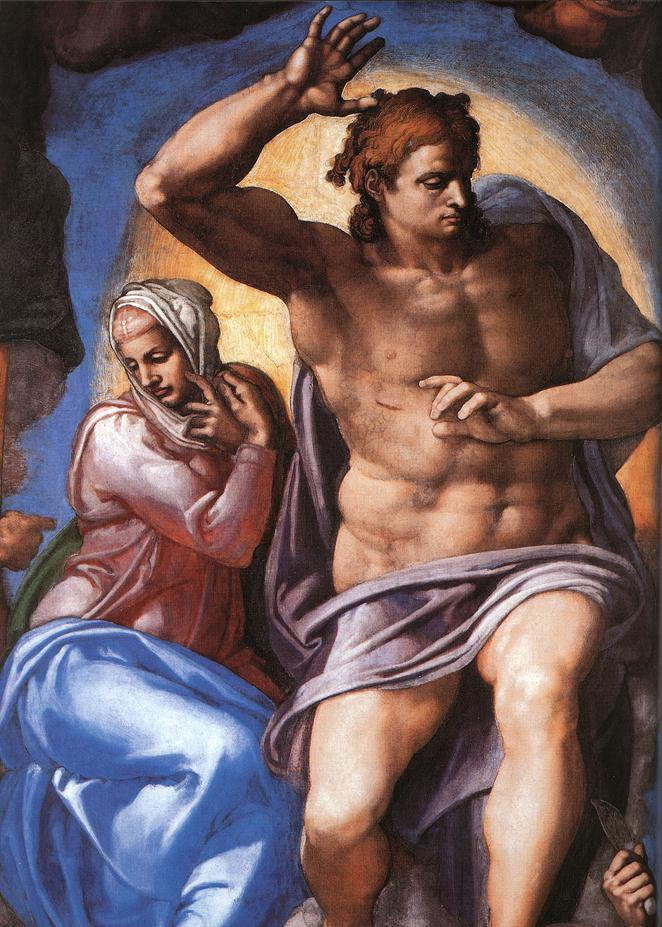
Mary and Christ, in The Last Judgement by Michelangelo (1541). This depiction was much criticised.

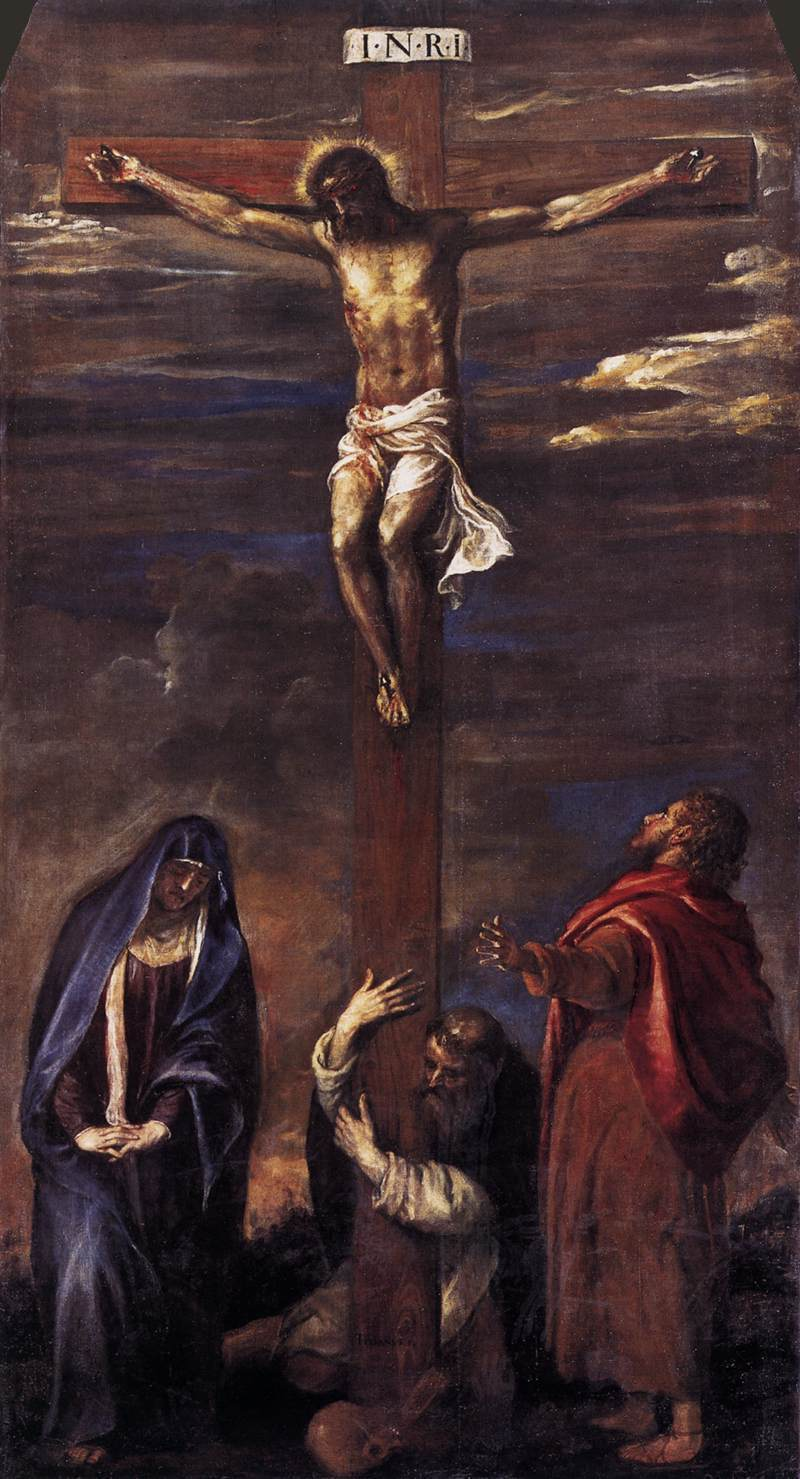
The Crucifixion of Christ, 1558, by Titian

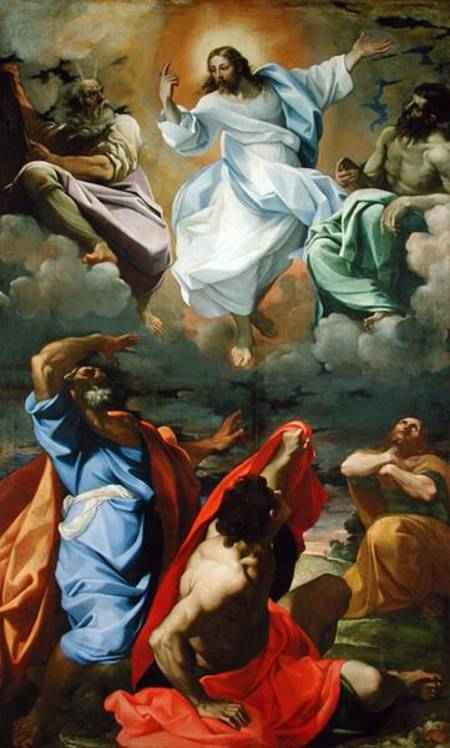
Transfiguration of Jesus depicting him with Elijah, Moses and three apostles by Carracci, 1594

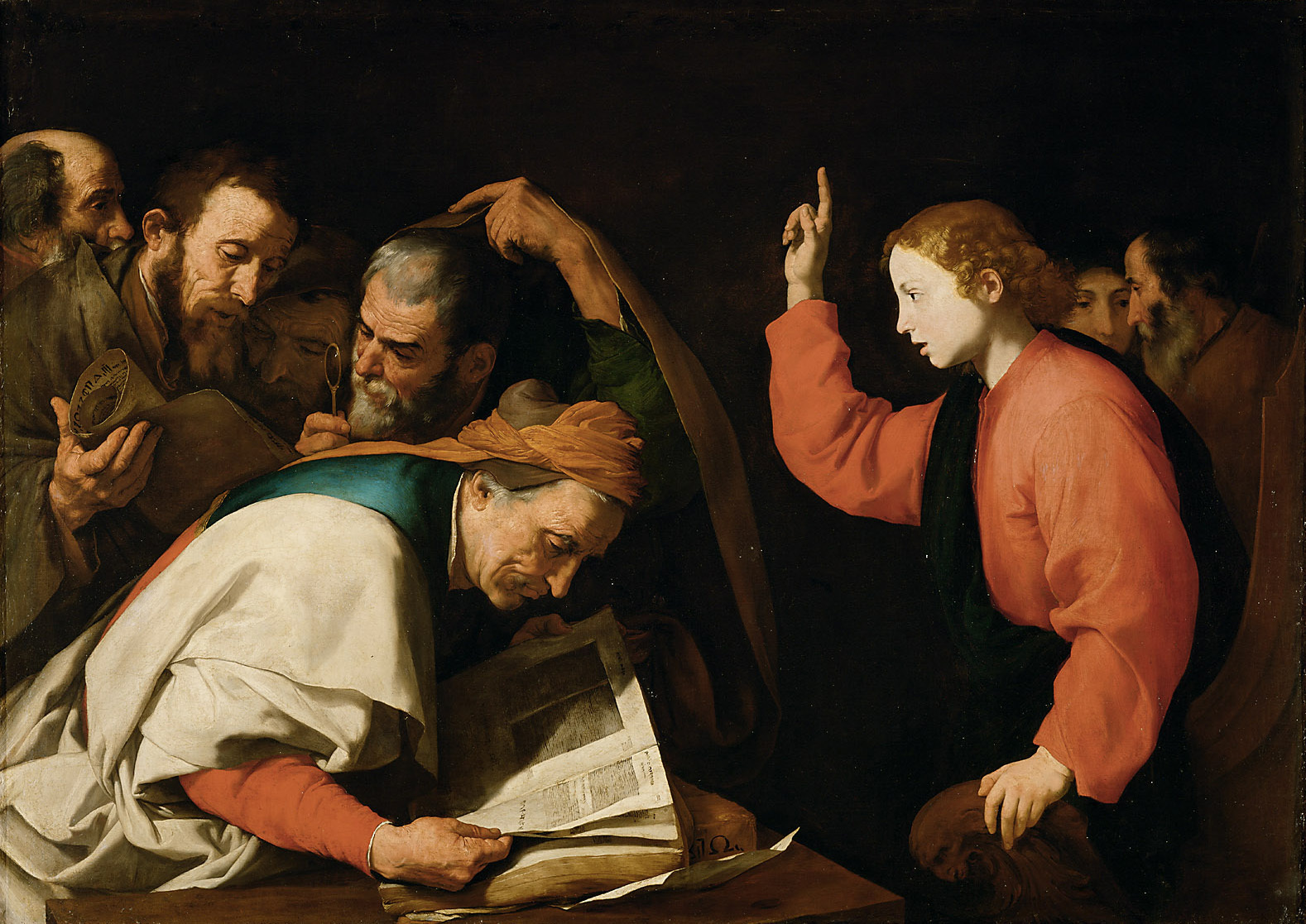
Jesus, aged 12, Jesus among the Doctors (as a child debating in the temple), 1630 by Jusepe de Ribera

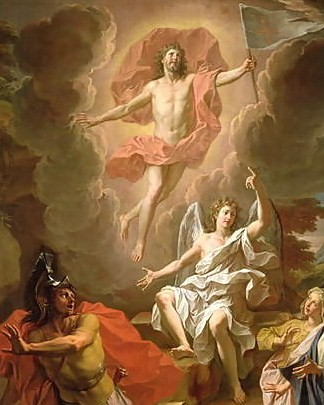
Resurrection by Noël Coypel, 1700, using a hovering depiction of Jesus

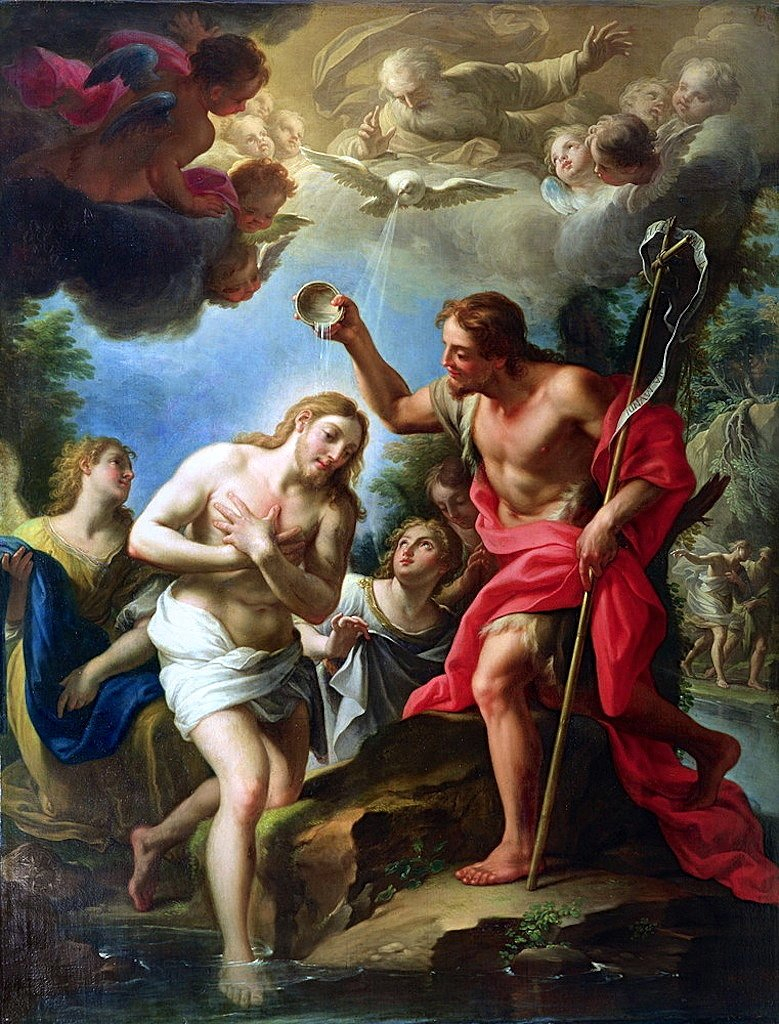
Trevisani's depiction of the typical baptismal scene with the sky opening and the Holy Spirit descending as a dove, 1723

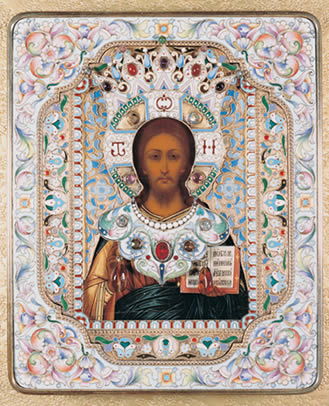
19th-century Russian icon of Christ Pantocrator

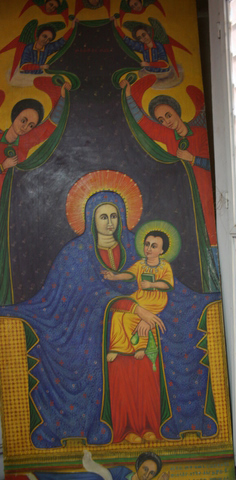
A traditional Ethiopian depiction of Jesus and Mary with distinctively Ethiopian features

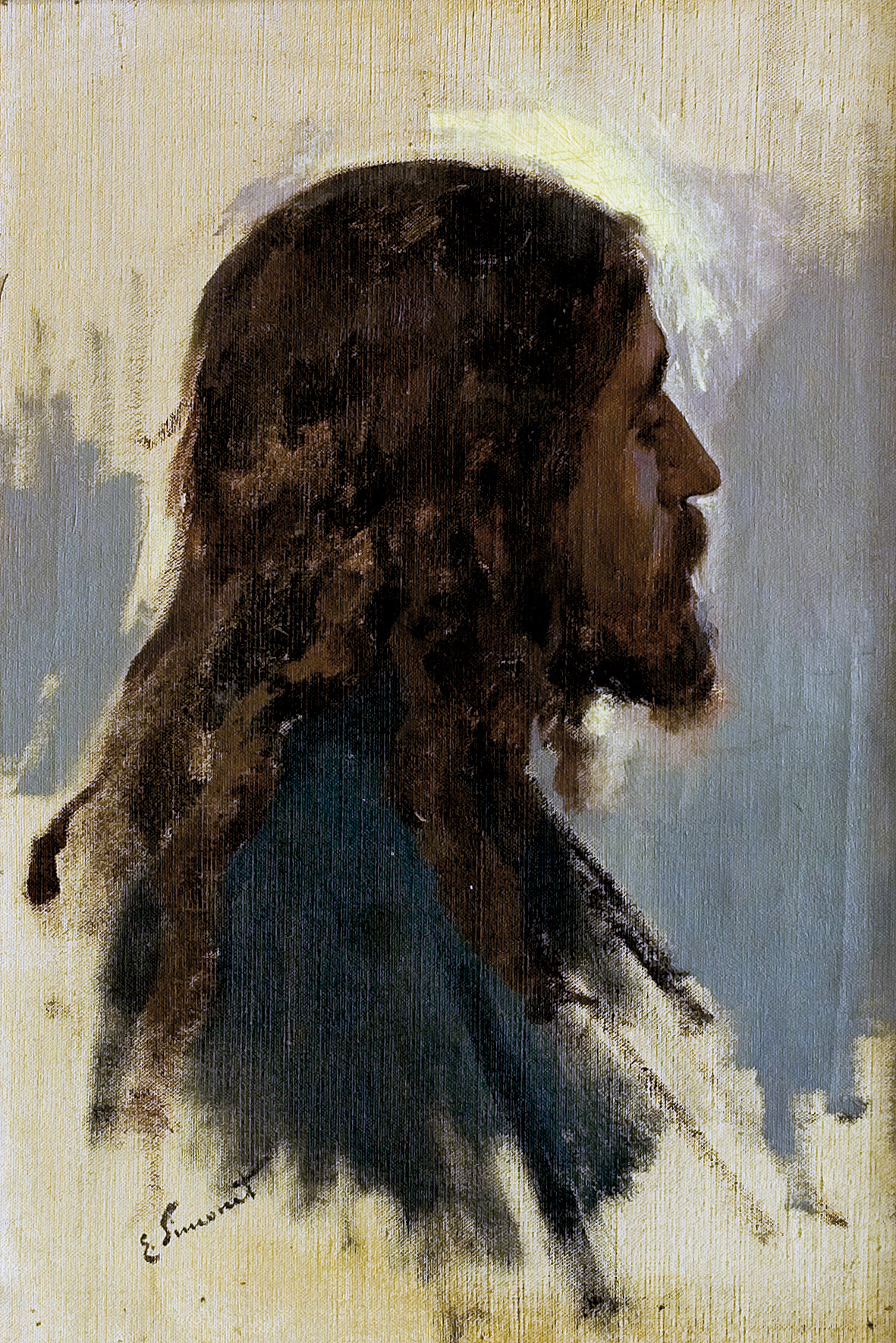
Head of Jesus (1890) by Enrique Simonet

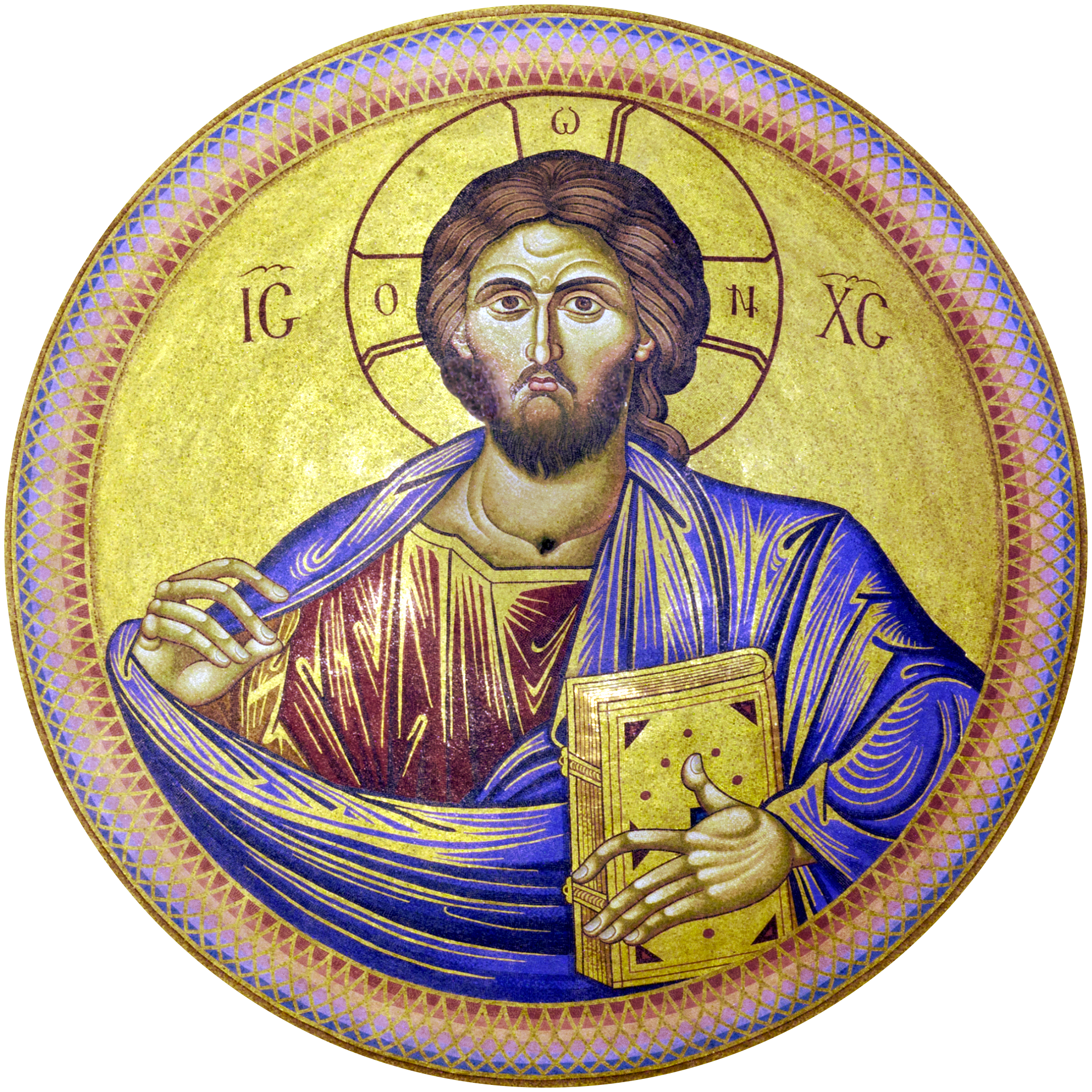
Christ Pantocrator mosaic in the dome above the Katholikon of the Church of the Holy Sepulchre in Jerusalem

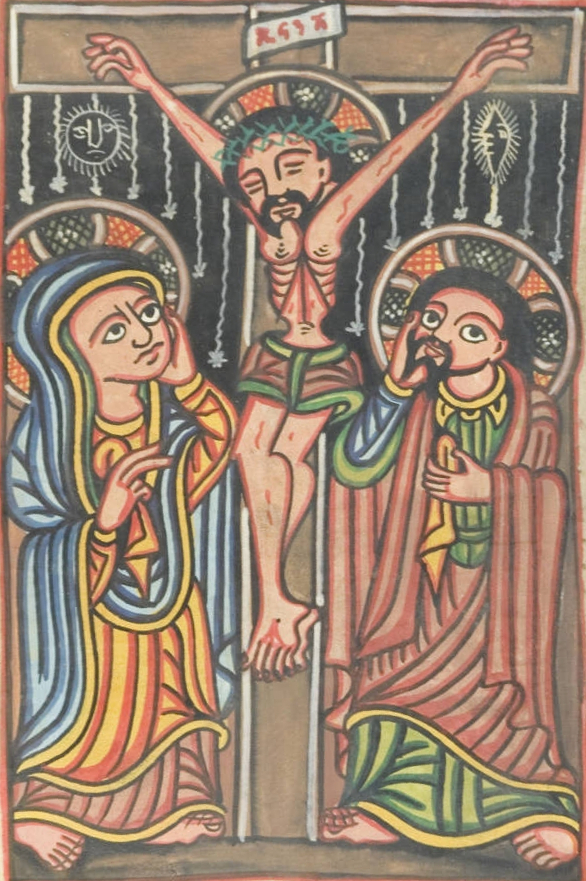
Crucifixion of Jesus as depicted in the Ethiopian Alwan Codex, 20th century

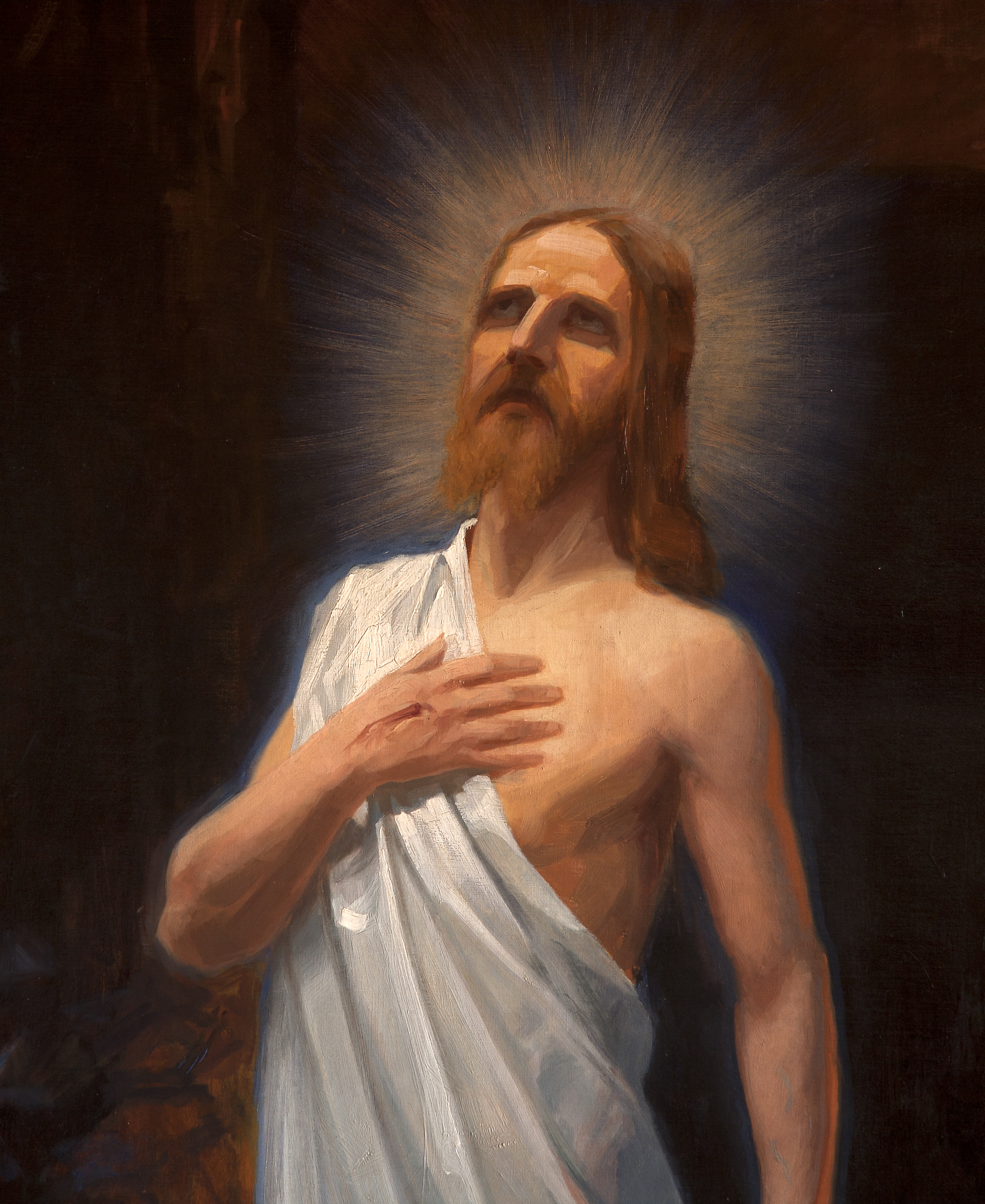
Jesus Christ as painted in the Church of Hässleholm, Sweden, by the painter Georg Hansen (1868-1932)

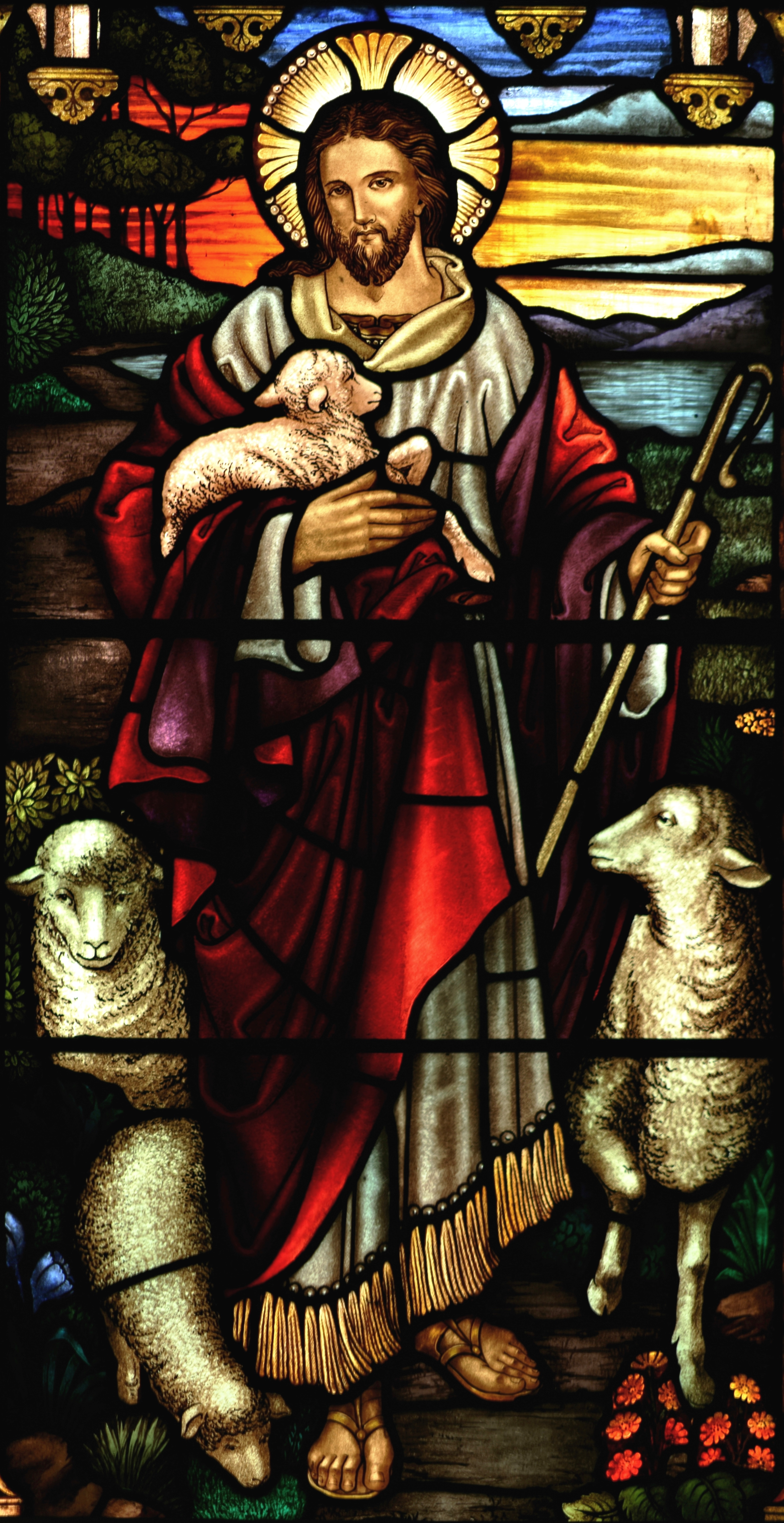
Jesus as Good Shepherd (1932) in stained glass at St John's Ashfield

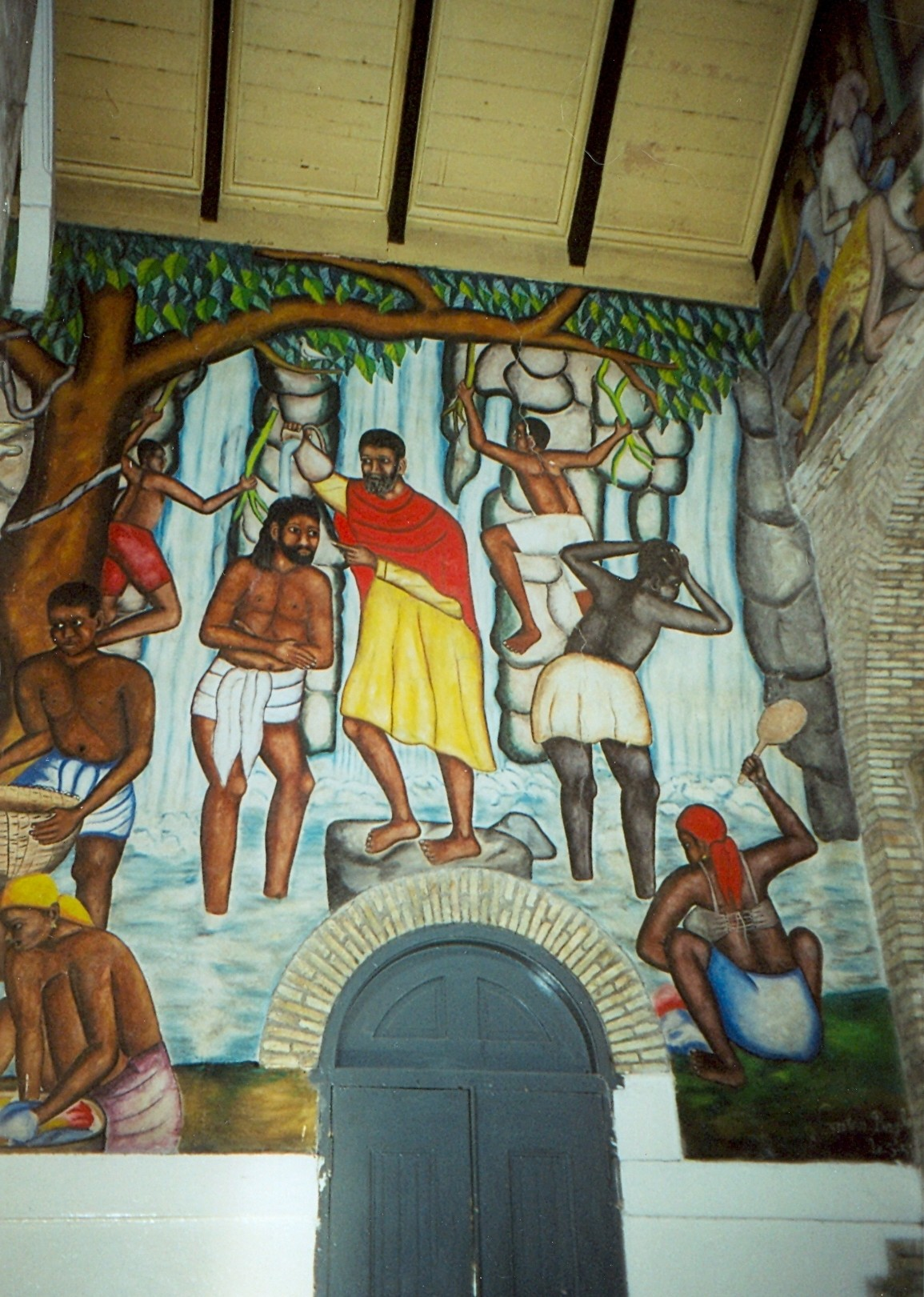
A mural (1951) depicting the baptism of Jesus in a typical Haitian rural scenery, Cathédrale de Sainte Trinité, Port-au-Prince, Haiti

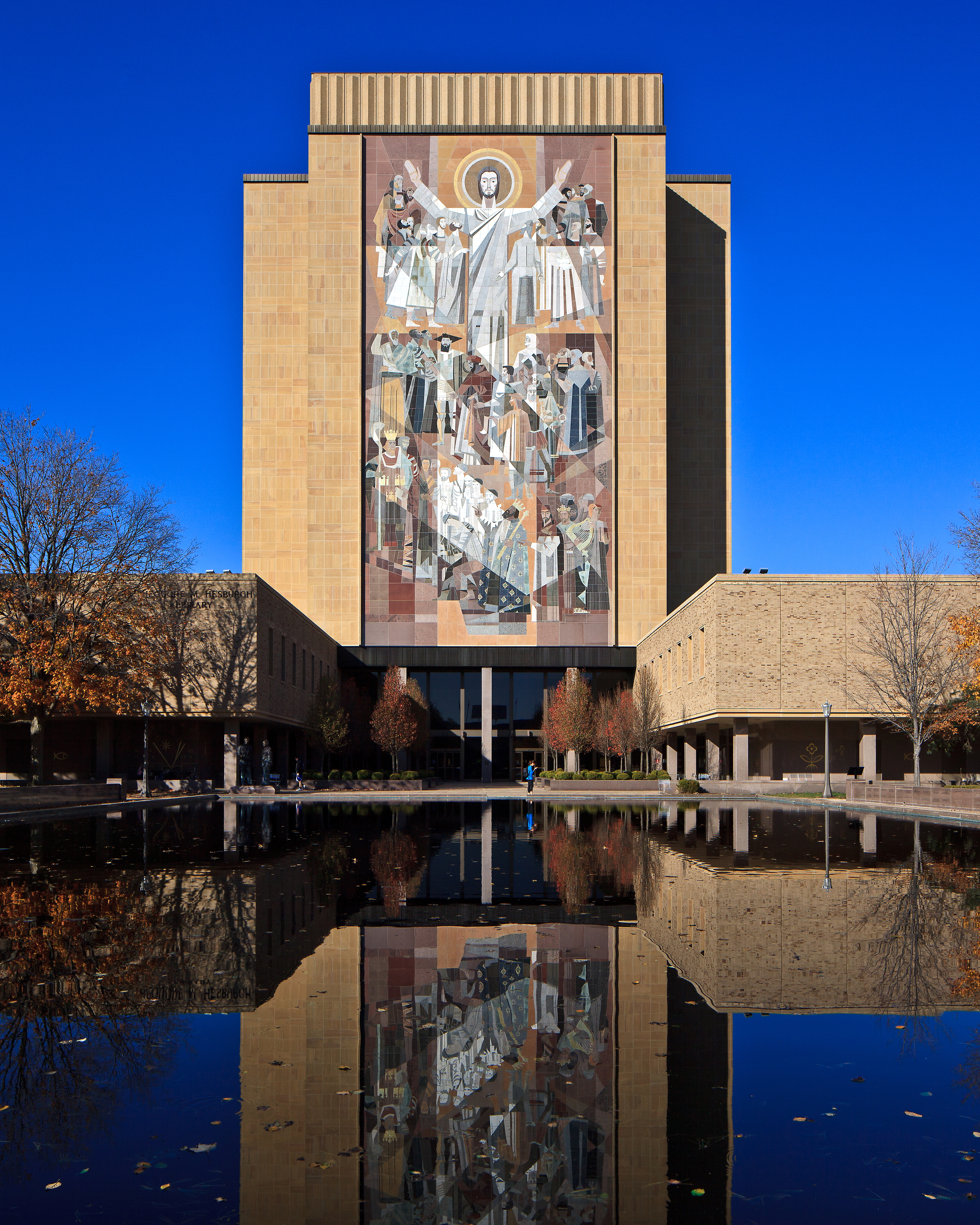
The Word of Life (1964) mural on the side of the Hesburgh Library at the University of Notre Dame

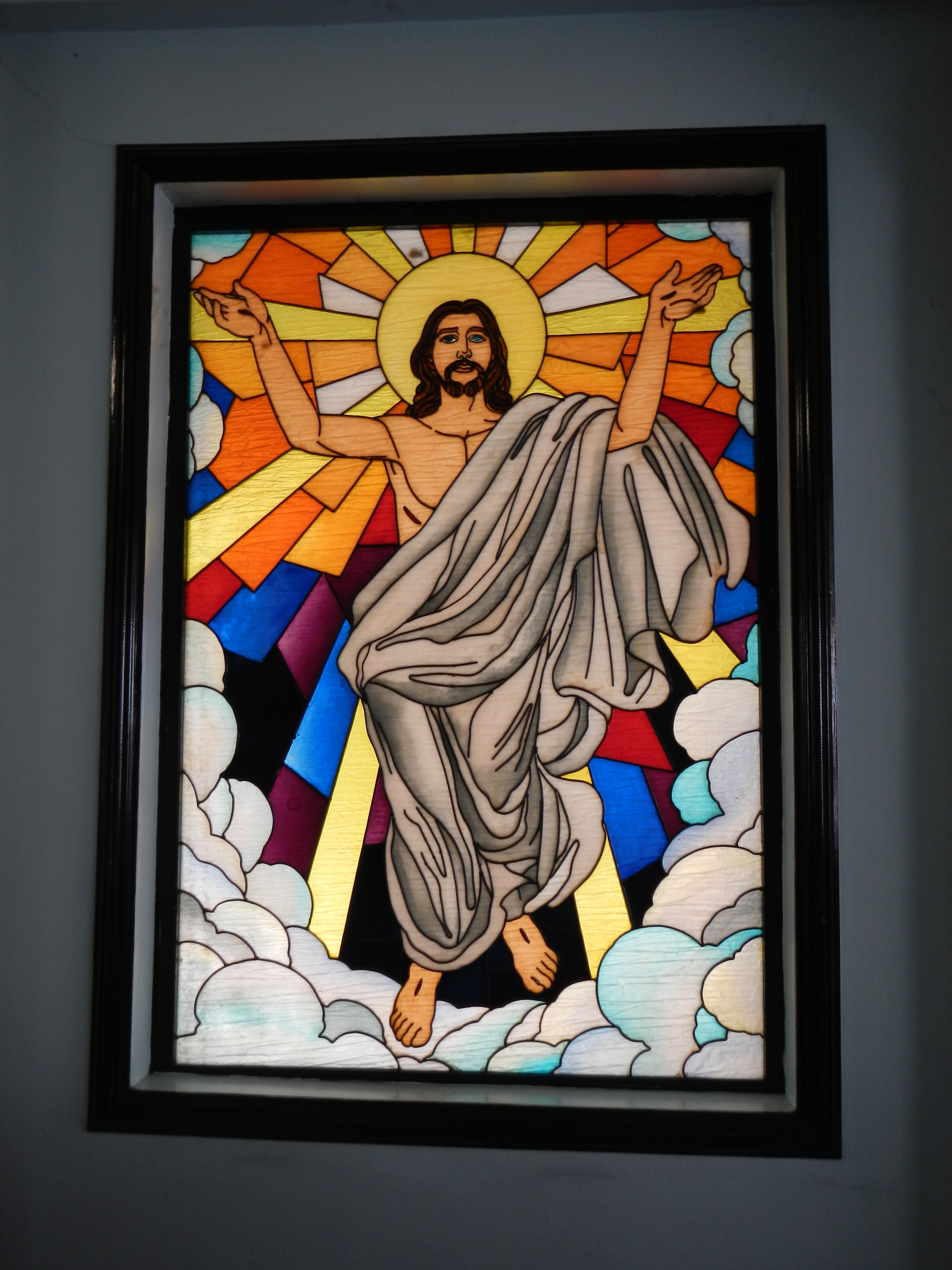
Depiction of Jesus at the Santuario de San Jose in Mandaluyong, Philippines

=== Sculpture ===
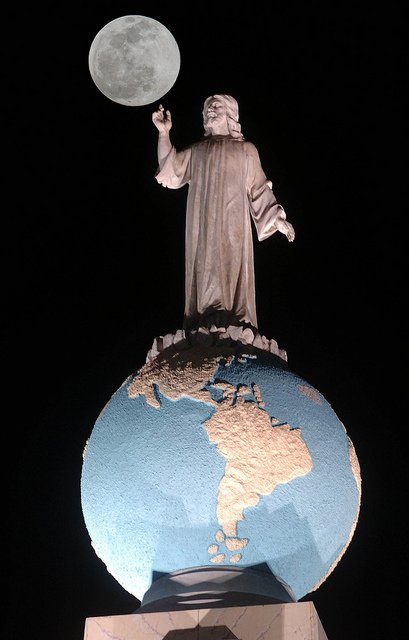
Monumento al Divino Salvador del Mundo is an iconic landmark that represents San Salvador city. It symbolizes the Transfiguration of Jesus standing on top of Earth as the savior of the world

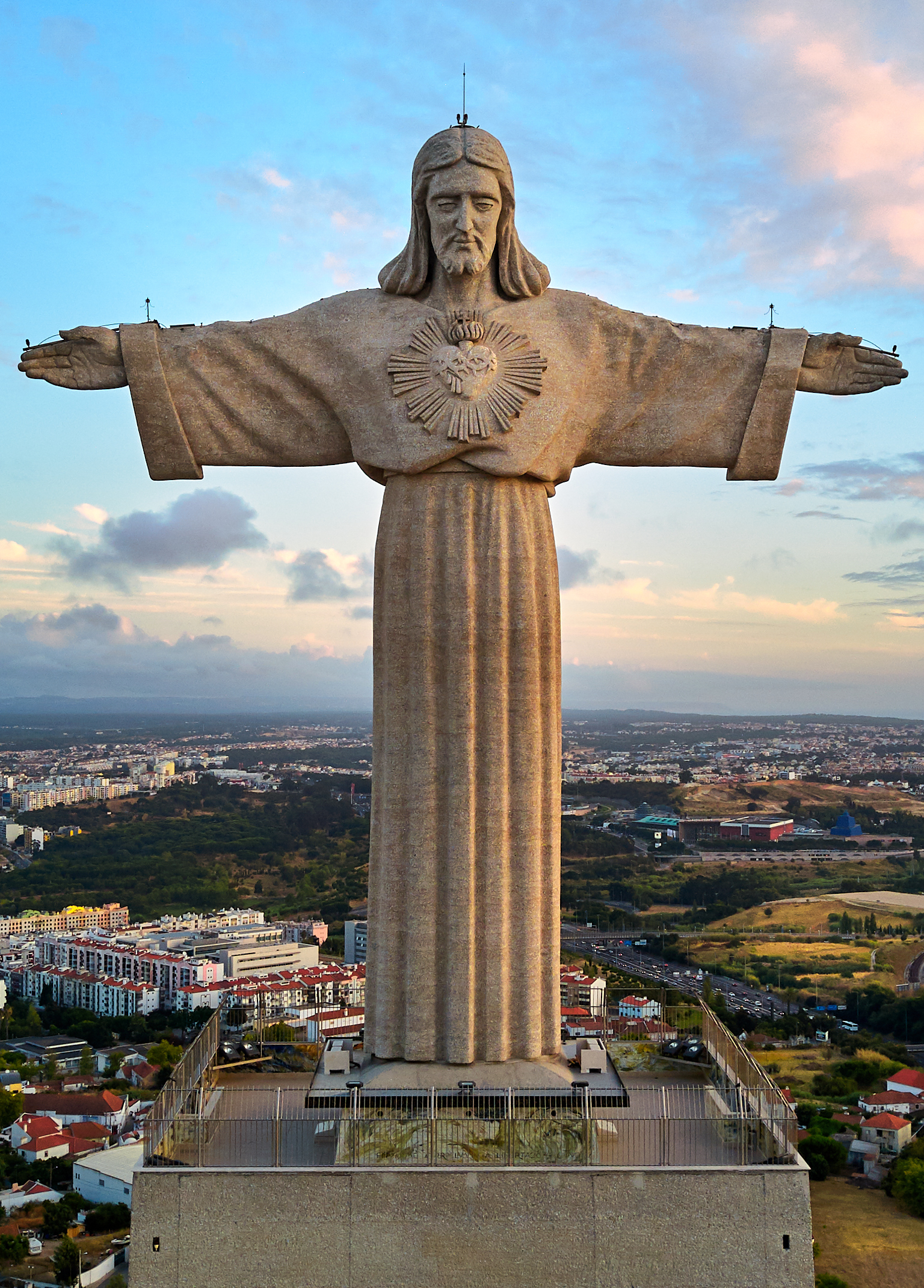
Christ the King in Portugal

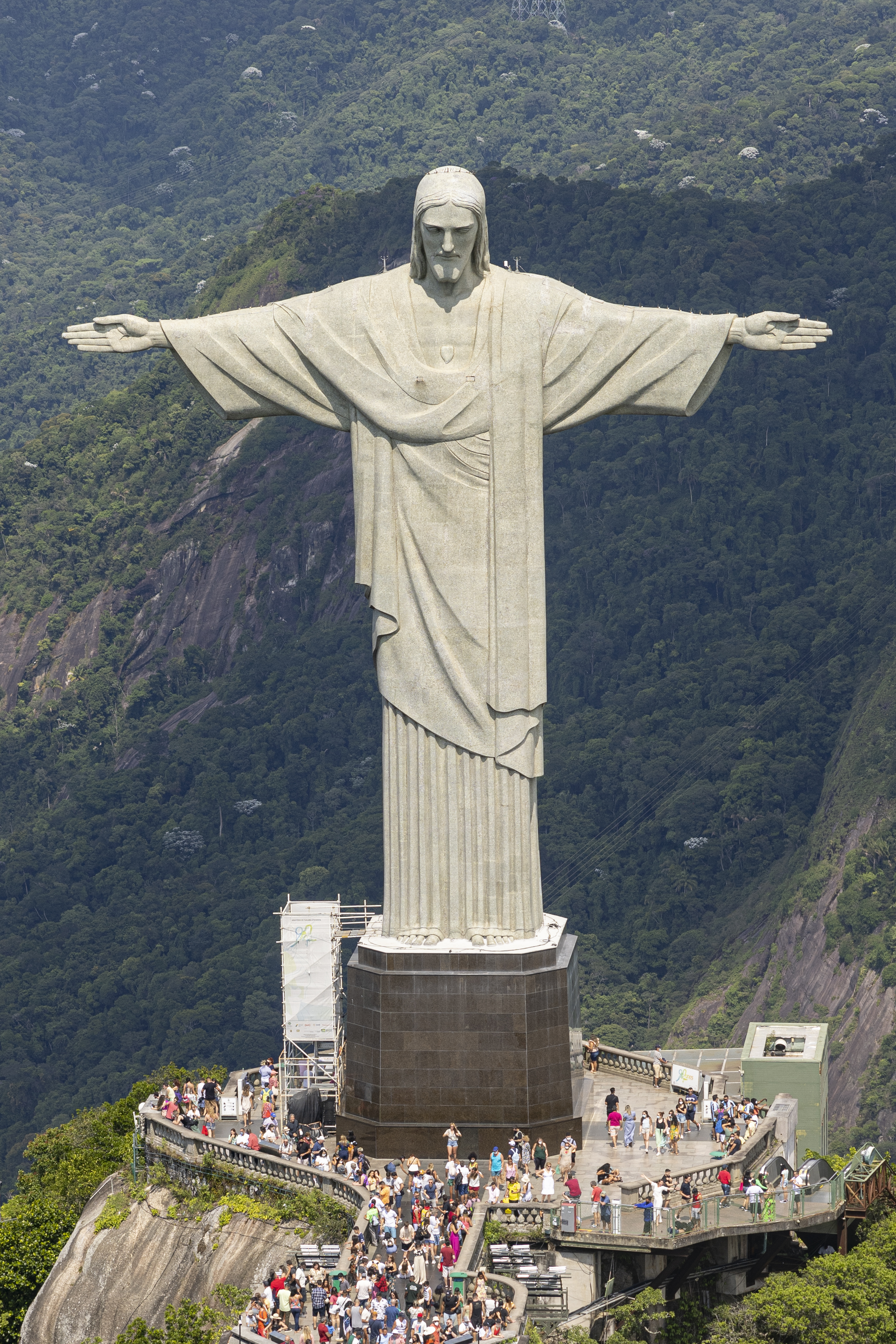
Christ the Redeemer, the most famous icon in Rio de Janeiro, Brazil

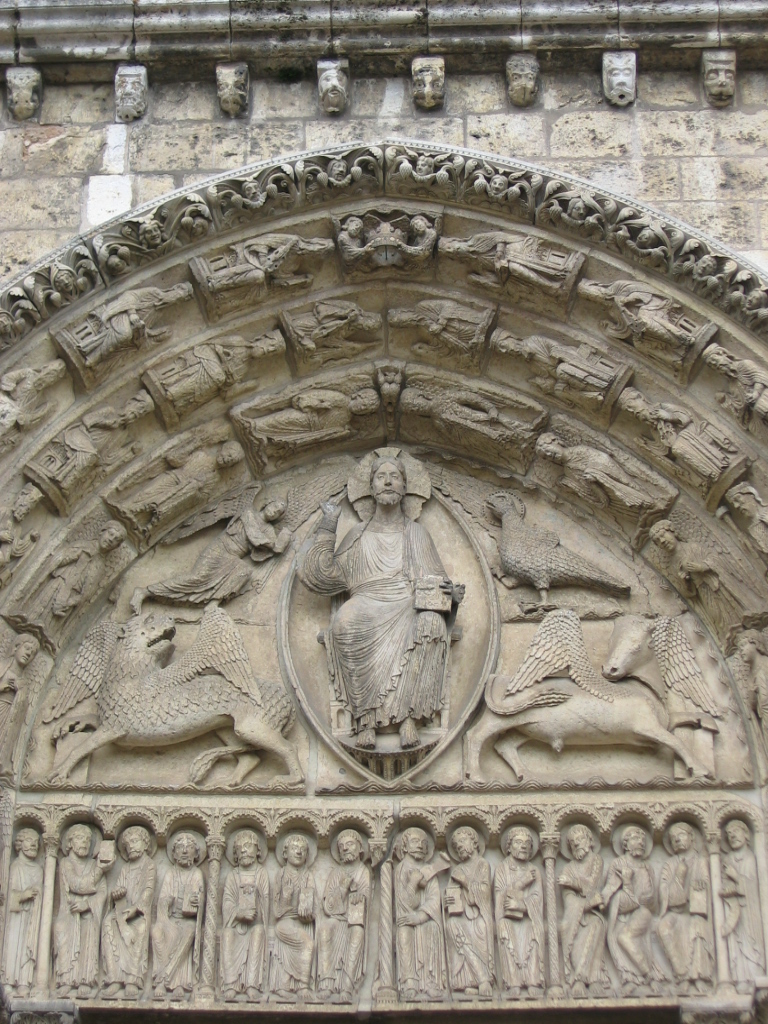
Christ in Majesty, Chartres Cathedral

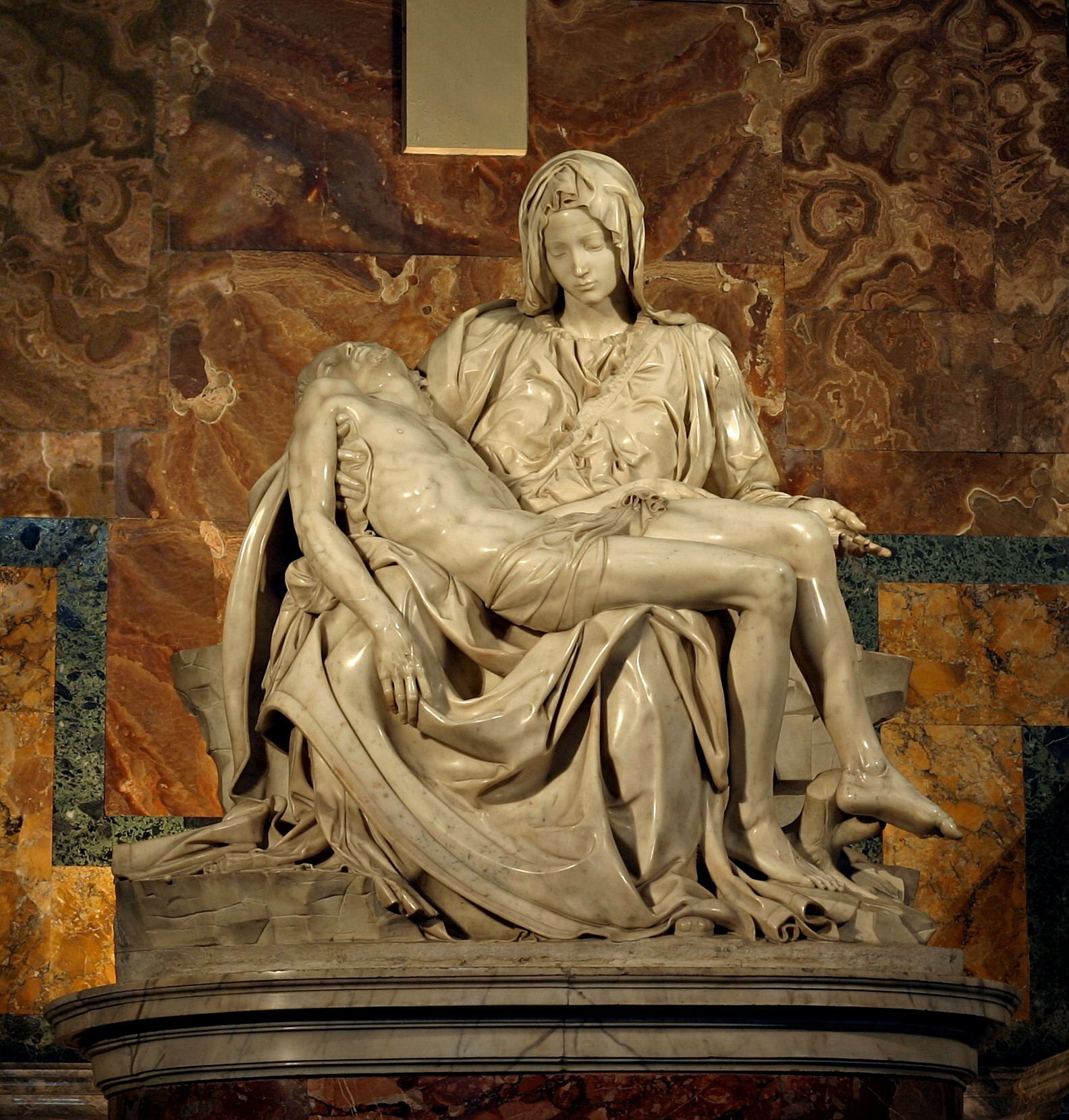
Michelangelo's Pietà, 1498–99, shows Mary holding the dead body of Jesus

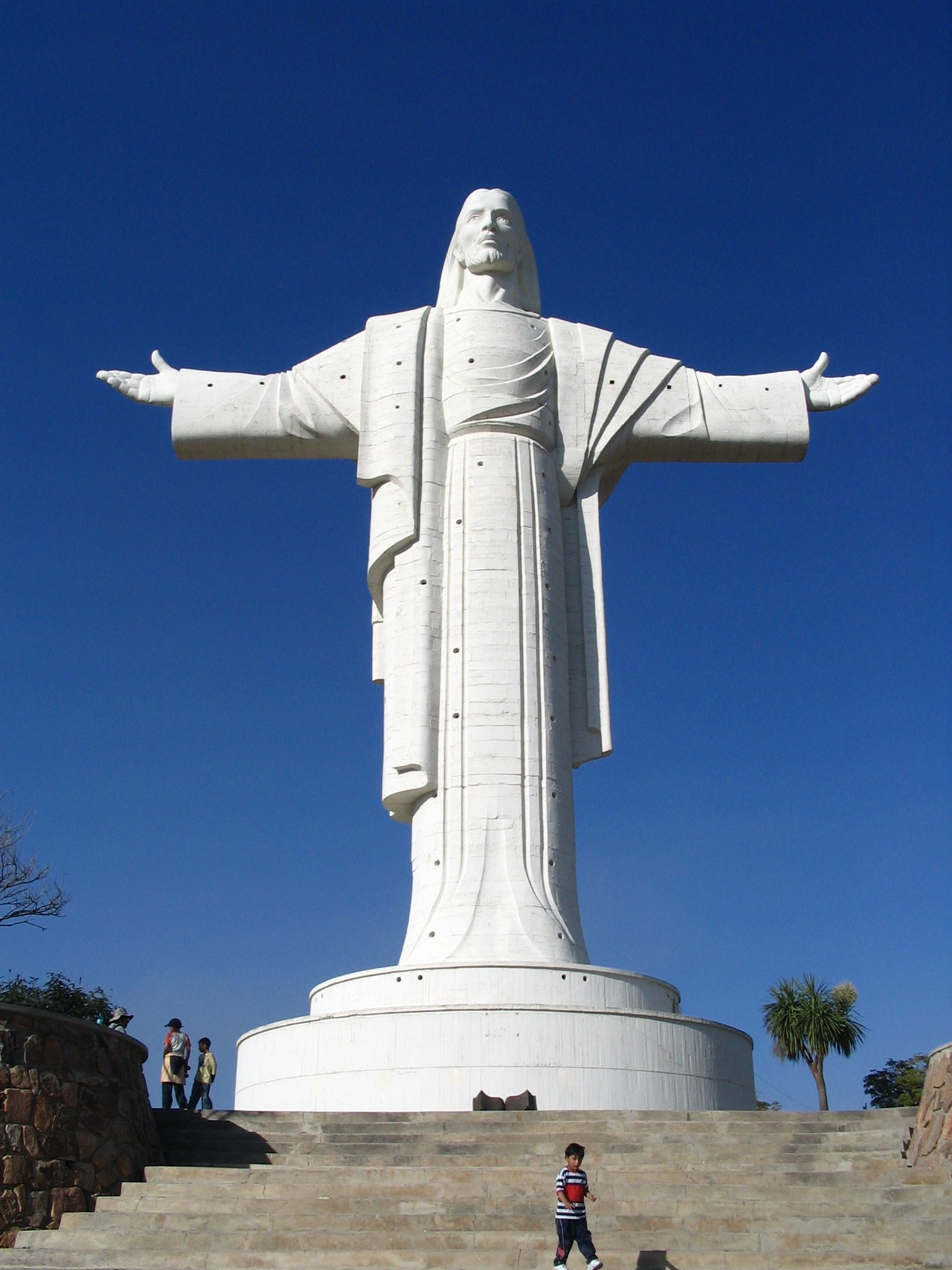
Cristo de la Concordia in Bolivia, claimed to be the largest statue of Jesus ever made

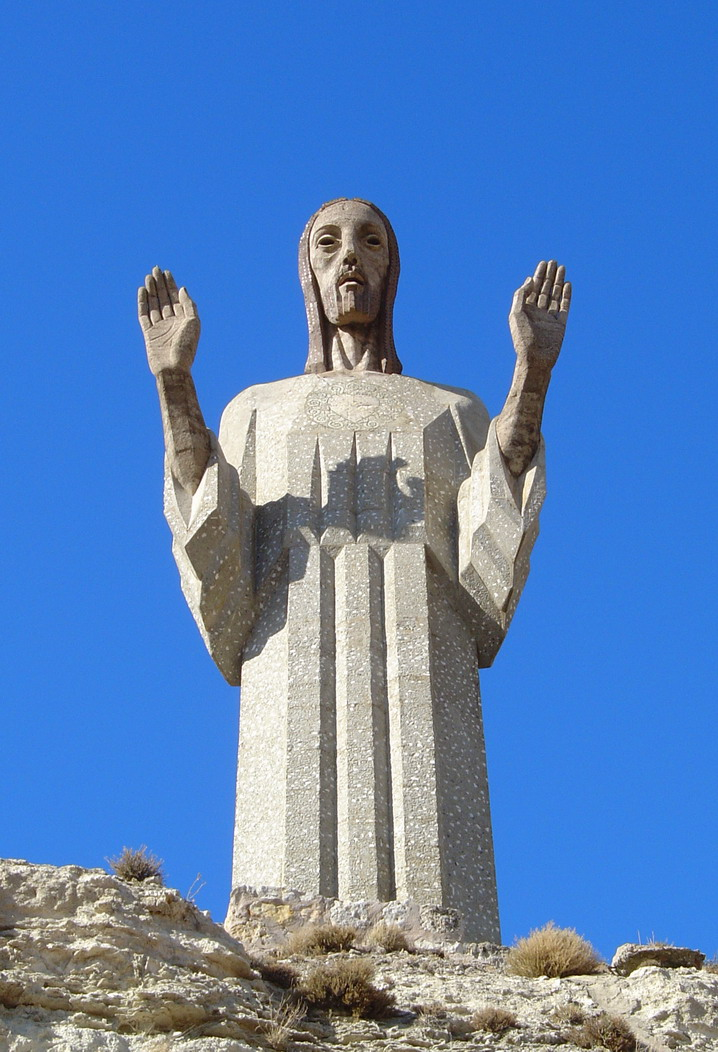
Cristo del Otero, above Palencia, Spain

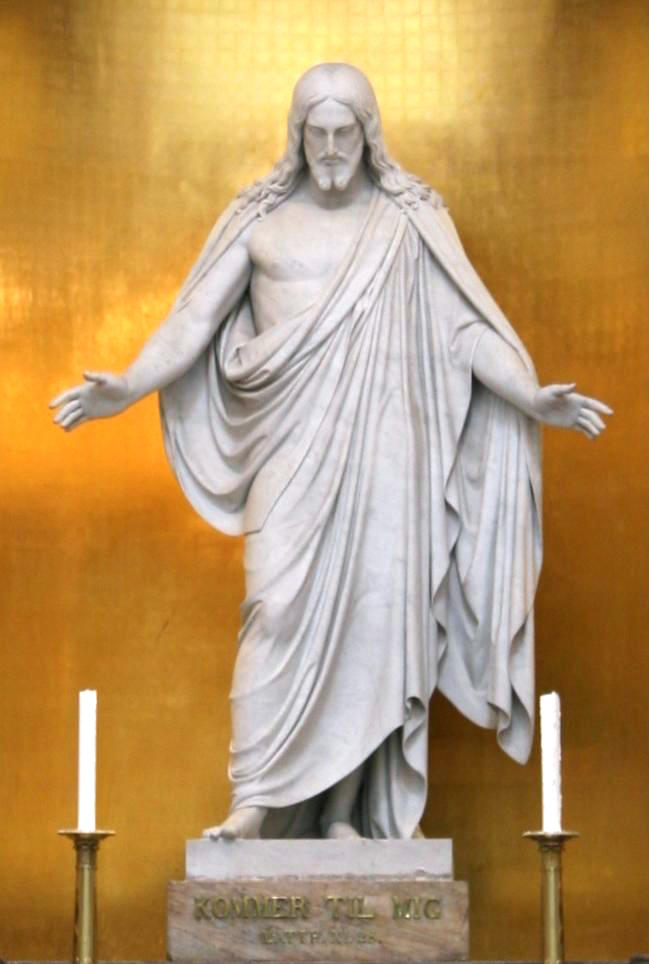
Bertel Thorvaldsen's Christus, Church of Our Lady, Copenhagen

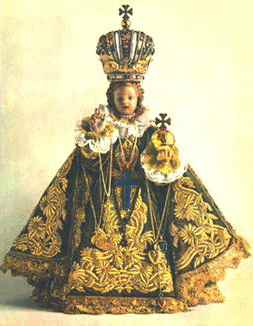
Infant Jesus of Prague, one of several miniature statues of an infant Christ that are much venerated by the faithful

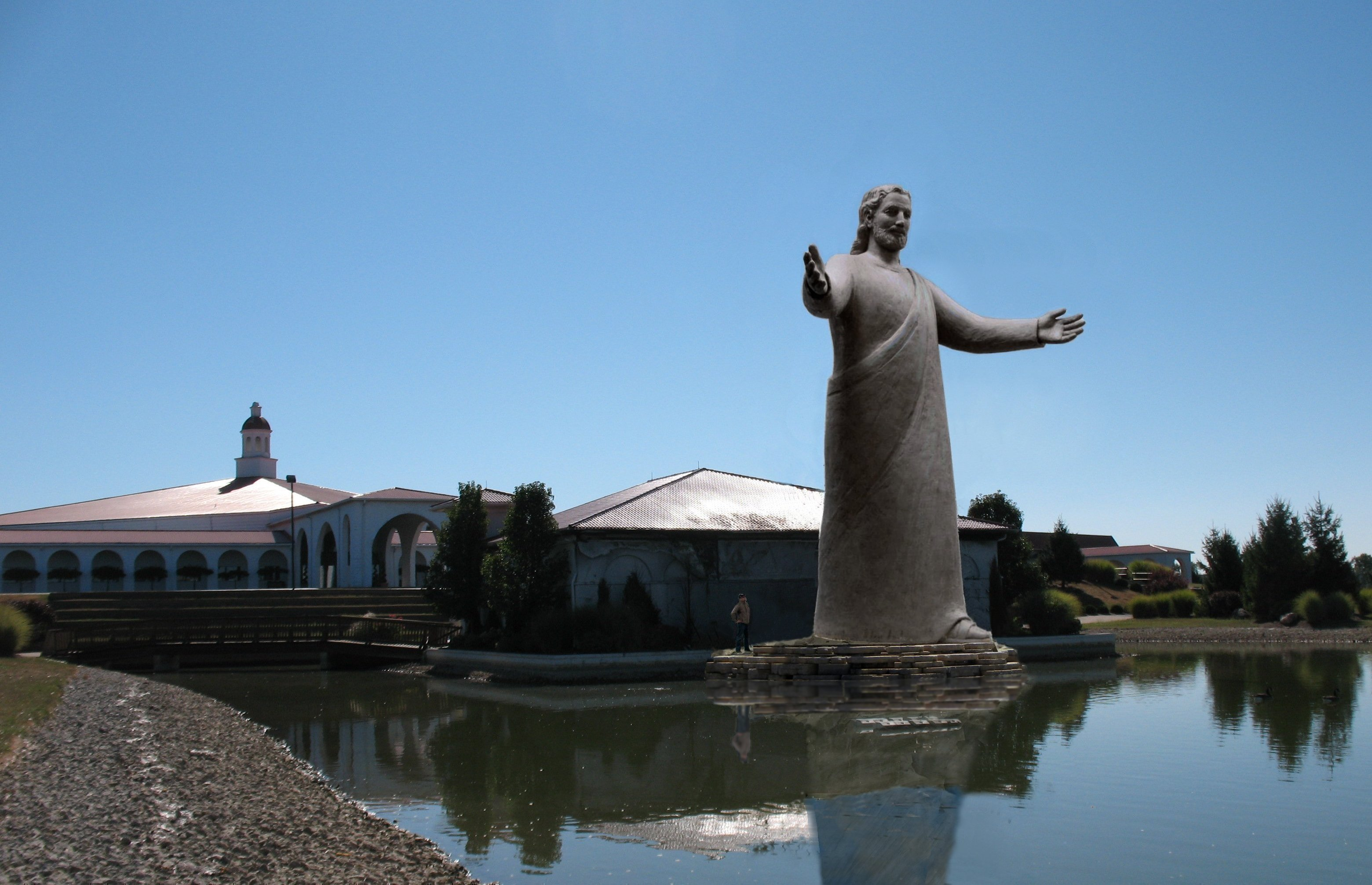
Lux Mundi, a statue of Jesus by Tom Tsuchiya completed in 2012

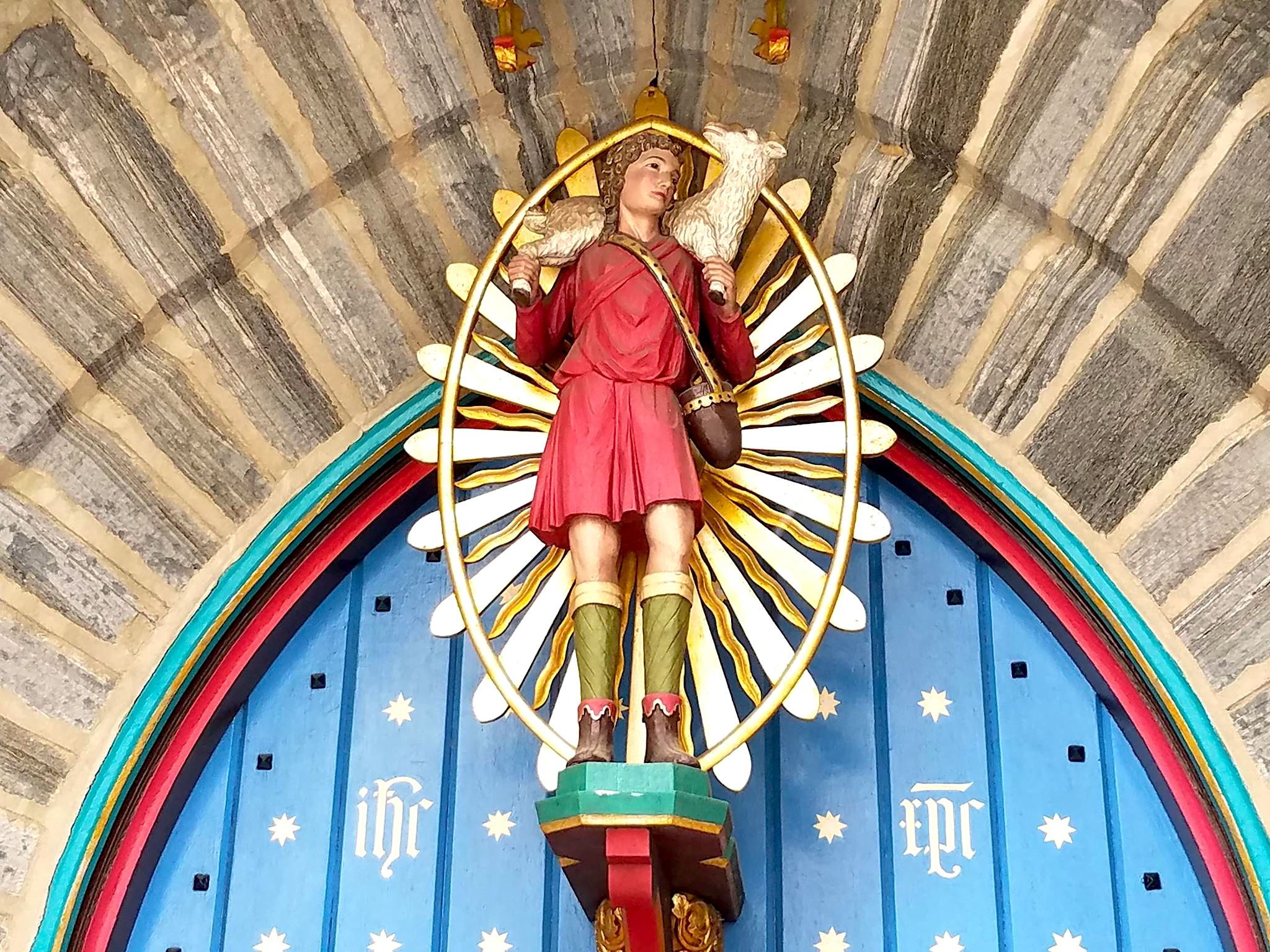
The boy Jesus as the Good Shepherd, Church of the Good Shepherd (Rosemont, Pennsylvania)

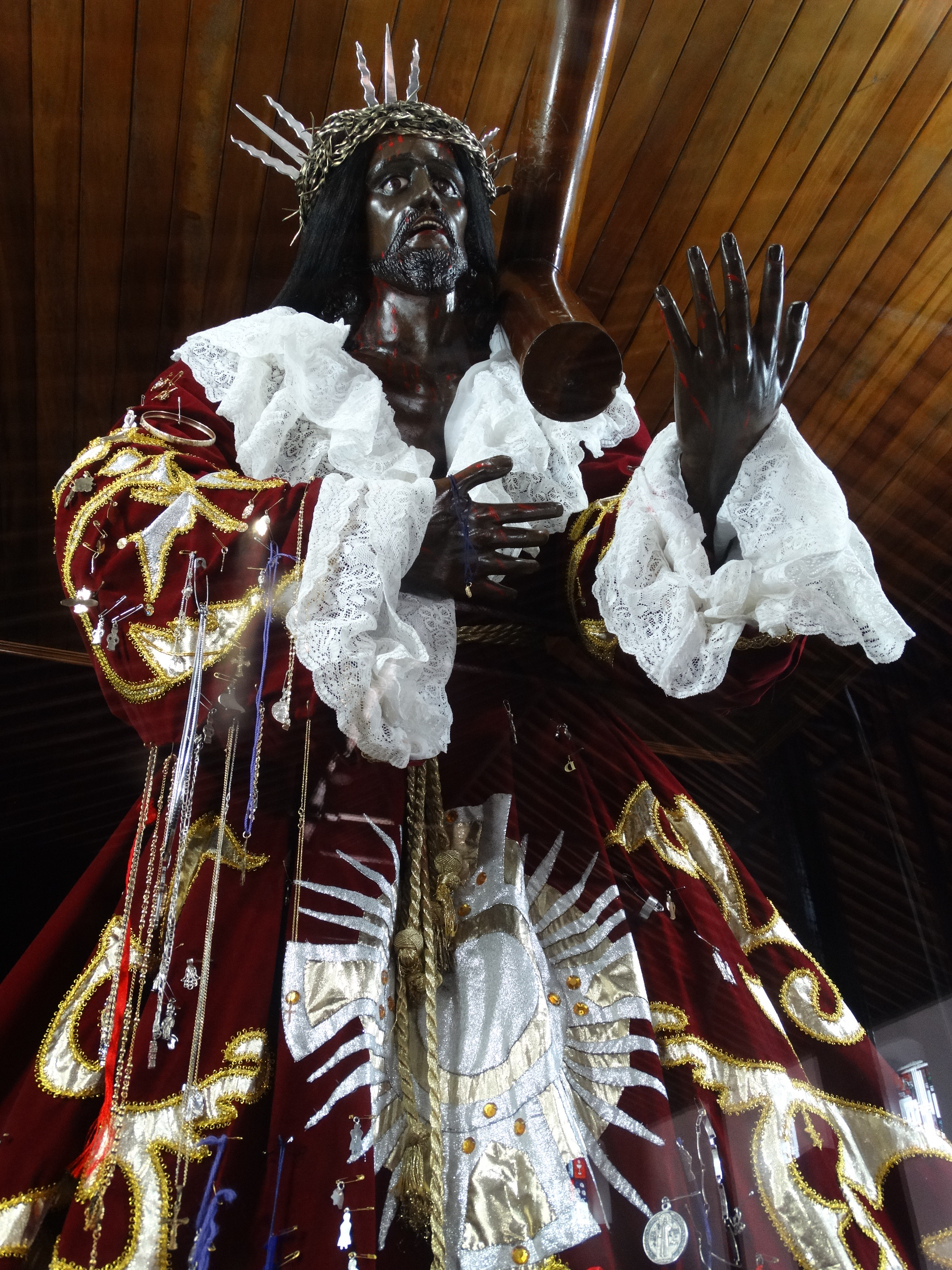
The Cristo Negro, at the Iglesia de San Felipe, Portobelo, Panama.

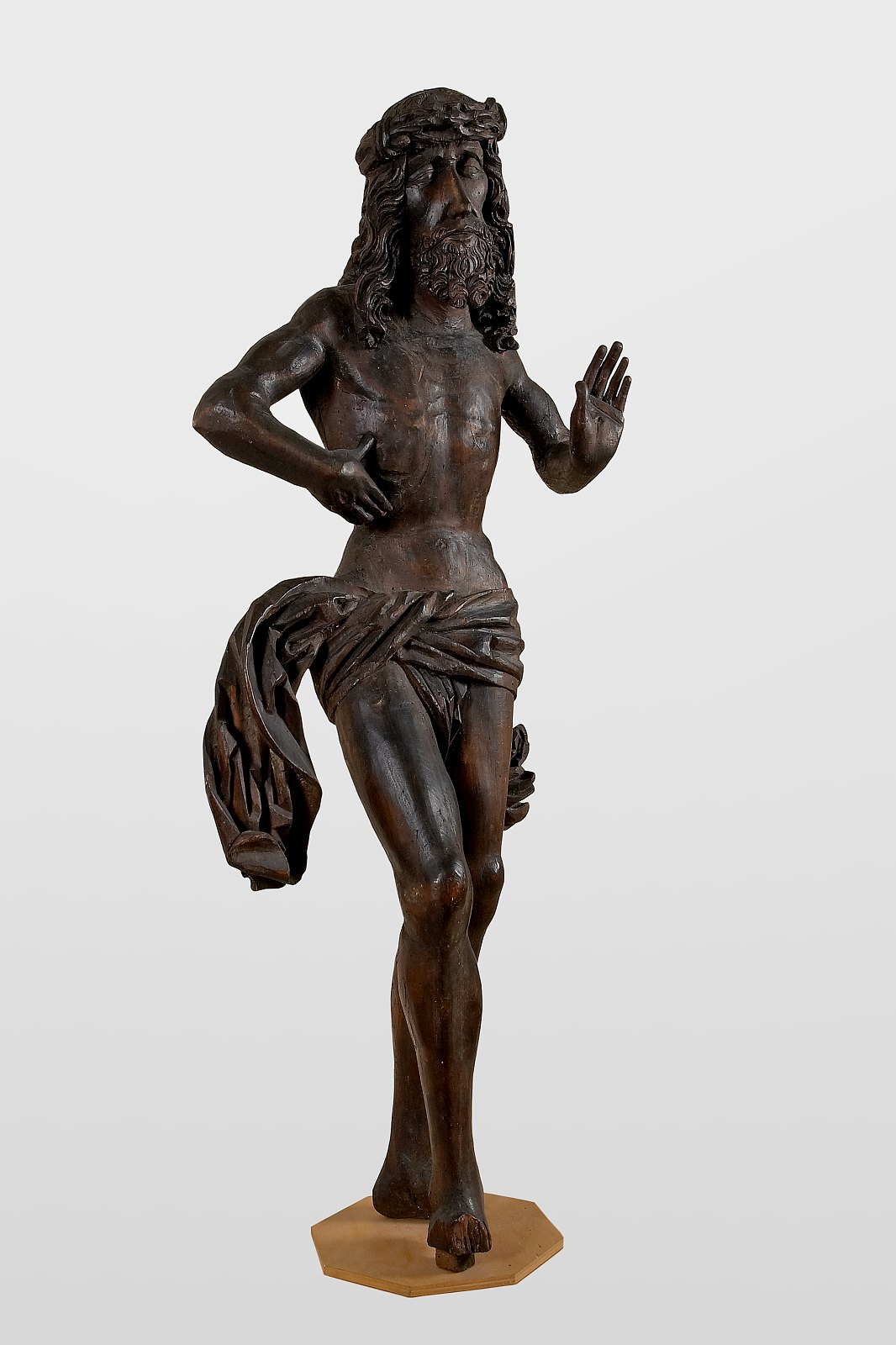
16th century sculpture of suffering Christ, Cheb, Czechia.

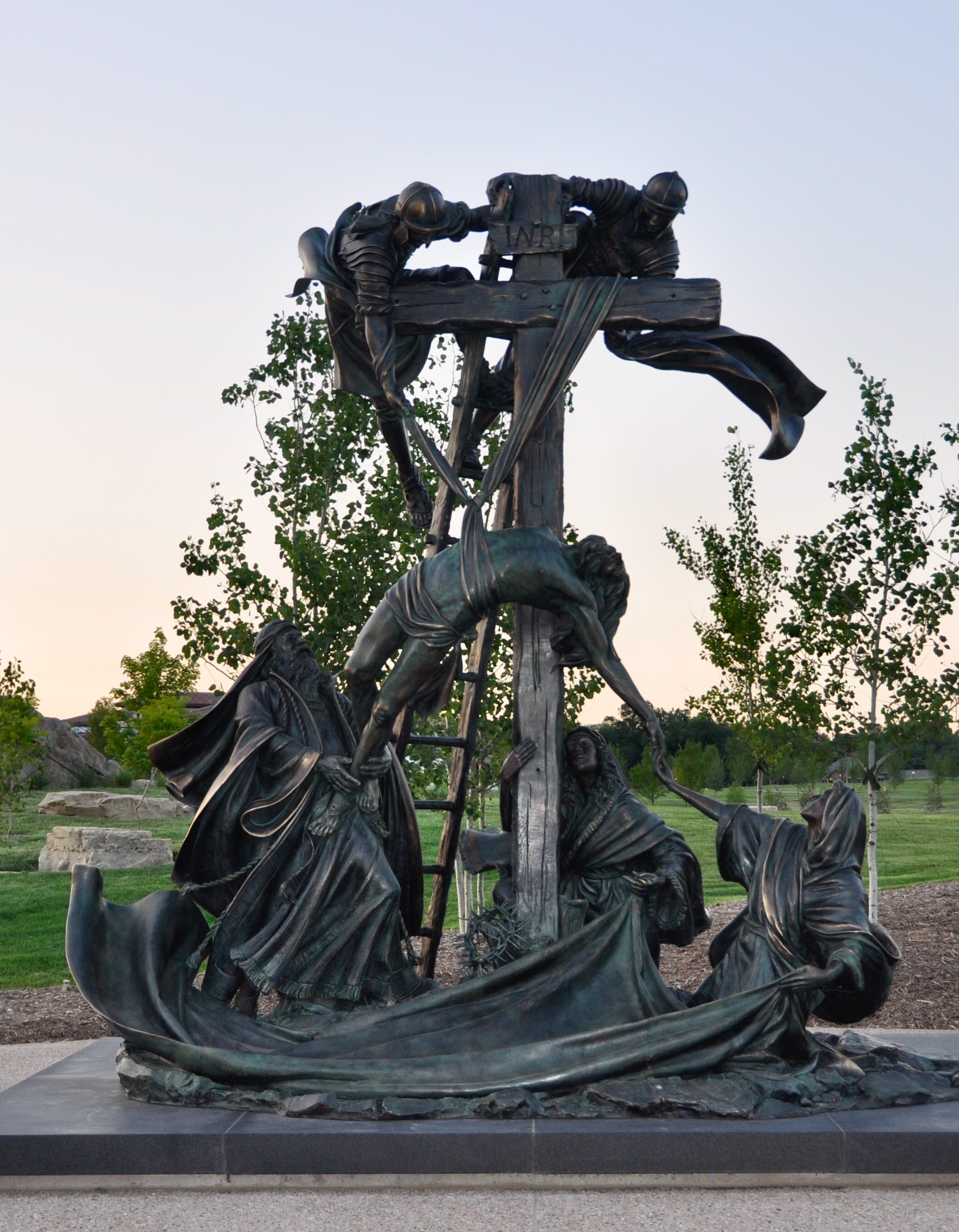
Bronze statue depicting the Descent from the Cross, Cloisters on the Platte near Omaha, Nebraska, 21:st century

== See also ==
- Jesus look
- Category:Cultural depictions of Jesus
- Crucifixion
- God the Father in Western art
- Holy card
- Ichthys
- List of statues of Jesus
- Ostentatio genitalium
- Perceptions of religious imagery in natural phenomena
- Race and appearance of Jesus
- Resurrection of Jesus in Christian art
- Salvator Mundi
- Veil of Veronica
- Alexamenos graffito
