= Sisters of the Reparation of the Holy Face =

Catholic religious congregation

The Pontifical Congregation of the Benedictine Sisters of the Reparation of the Holy Face is a Roman Catholic women's congregation of pontifical right whose focus is providing Acts of Reparation to Jesus Christ.

== Background ==
Devotion to the Holy Face of Jesus dates back to Sister Marie of St Peter, a Carmelite nun in Tours France who in 1843 reported visions of Jesus and Mary in which she was urged to spread the devotion to the Holy Face of Jesus, in reparation for the many insults Jesus suffered in his Passion. The devotion was further spread from Tours by the efforts of the Venerable Leo Dupont (also known as the Apostle of the Holy Face) who prayed for the establishment of the devotion for 30 years, burning a lamp before a painted image of Jesus. Pope Leo XIII approved of the devotion in 1885.

== History ==
On the first Friday in Lent 1936, Sister Maria Pierina de Micheli, a member of the Congregation of the Daughters of the Immaculate Conception in Milan, reported a vision in which Jesus told her: "I will that My Face, which reflects the intimate pains of My Spirit, the suffering and the love of My Heart, be more honored. He who meditates upon Me, consoles Me." In 1938, she was sent to Rome where she subsequently met Sylvestrine Benedictine Hildebrand Gregori, Abbot of the monastery of Santo Stefano del Cacco. Inspired by her efforts to promote devotion to the Holy Face, Grefori became similarly dedicated. Sister de Micheli died in Milan in 1945.

In 1950, the Venerable Abbot Hildebrand Gregori formed the organization "Prayerful Sodality" which in 1977 became the Pontifical Congregation of the Benedictine Sisters of the Reparation of the Holy Face.

In 1997, in association with the Sisters of the Reparation of the Holy Face, Cardinal Fiorenzo Angelini formed the International Institute for Research on the Face of Christ in Rome .

In his letter of 27 September 2000 to Cardinal Angelini, on the occasion of the 50th anniversary of the formation of the order, Pope John Paul II described the goal of the Benedictine Sisters of the Reparation of the Holy Face as: "The unceasing effort to stand beside the endless crosses on which the Son of God continues to be crucified."

The congregation has houses on several continents.

== See also ==
- Acts of Reparation
- Marie Martha Chambon
- Veronican Sisters of the Holy Face
