= Archconfraternity of the Holy Face =

Lay confraternity founded in Tours in the 19th century

The Archconfraternity of the Holy Face was established in Tours, France in 1876, by Archbishop Charles Colet; and raised to an Archconfraternity by Pope Leo XIII in 1885.

== History ==
In June 1876, Charles Théodore Colet, Archbishop of Tours, erected the Confraternity of the Holy Face at the Oratory of the Holy Face. Based in part on the spirituality of the Discalced Carmelite Mary of Saint Peter, its chief objective is reparation for blasphemy and not keeping the Lord's day. This devotion to the Holy Face of Jesus was based on images of the Veil of Veronica, as promoted by Leo Dupont, rather than the Shroud of Turin, which image first appeared on a photographic negative in 1898.

Thérèse of Lisieux enrolled in the confraternity in April, 1885; as did her parents, Louis and Marie-Azélie Martin. The following October, Pope Leo XIII approved the Scapular of the Holy Face and elevated the confraternity to an archconfraternity.

== Present day ==
The home of the Archconfraternity is the Centre Spirituel de la Sainte Face in Tours, run by the Dominican Fathers of the French Province. In 1960, the Confraternity of the Holy Face was canonically erected at Carmelite Monastery of the Little Flower of Jesus, in Buffalo, New York; it is affiliated with the Archconfraternity of the Holy Face at Tours, France. There is also a confraternity at the Monastery of the Infant Jesus of Prague & St. Joseph in Dallas, Texas.

== Scapular ==
The Scapular of the Holy Face originated in 1885, based on the devotion to the Holy Face of Jesus. It is worn by the members of the Archconfraternity of the Holy Face.

The wearing of this picture is simply one of the pious practices of the archconfraternity, without any special indulgences for its use.

=== Description ===
This scapular is made of two pieces of white cloth. On one is a well-known picture connected with St. Veronica. Members can, however, wear the picture on a medal or cross, in place of the scapular.

== See also ==
- Oratory of the Holy Face
