= Benedictine Sisters =

Benedictine Sisters may refer to any of the following Benedictine religious orders:

- Benedictine Sisters of the Reparation of the Holy Face
- Benedictine Sisters of Perpetual Adoration
- Benedictine Sisters of Elk County
- Benedictine Sisters of St. Walburg Monastery
