= Leo Dupont =

19th-century French Catholic founder of religious congregations

Venerable Leo Dupont
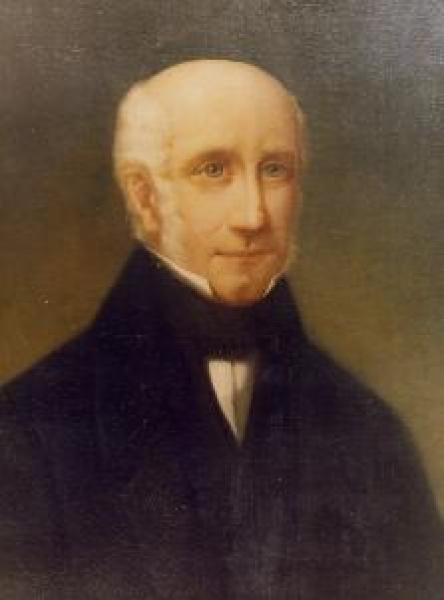
- Born: 24 January 1797; Le Lamentin, Martinique, France
- Died: 18 March 1876 (aged 79); Tours, France

Leo Dupont (24 January 1797 – 18 March 1876), also known as "the holy man of Tours" or "the apostle of the Holy Face", was a Roman Catholic layman who helped spread various devotions such as that of the Holy Face of Jesus and the nightly Eucharistic adoration. He was declared venerable by Pope Pius XII.

== Early life ==
Leon Papin Dupont was born 24 January 1797 on the family sugar plantation in Martinique. His father was Nicholas Dupont, a wealthy and slave-owning French planter, his mother was a creole from Martinique, Marie-Louise Gaigneron de Marolles. His father died when Leo was six years old. Leon was schooled in Martinique and then for two years at a boarding school in the United States while the French Revolution went on. He was then sent to France to further his education at the College of Pontlevoy, near the Chateau of Chissay, which belonged to his maternal uncle, the Comte Gaigneron de Marolles. He was religious from an early age, but along with his one brother Theobald he studied law in Paris. He had inherited a considerable fortune from his father.

During this period, Dupont met a number of religious figures including Saint Madeleine Sophie Barat, foundress of the Society of the Sacred Heart. Upon finishing his law degree, not having seen his mother for six years, he returned to Martinique, where he received an appointment as a councilor of the court. His younger brother Theobald died of a fever in 1823 when Leo was about twenty-four years old.

In 1827, Leo Dupont married Caroline d'Andiffredi and, in 1832, they had a daughter, Henrietta. Caroline died about a year after Henrietta was born. After the death of his wife, Dupont and his mother moved to France and, in 1834, settled in Tours, where the physician Pierre Bretonneau was a neighbor. He also made the acquaintance of William Palmer. Dupont established a law practice and became administrator of the Cathedral property.

== Religious focus ==
In July 1837, Dupont, his mother, and daughter visited his maternal uncle at the castle of Chissay-en-Touraine, where while gazing at a picture of Teresa of Ávila, he reportedly experienced a spiritual enlightenment. Dupont joined the recently formed Society of Saint Vincent de Paul, contributing large sums of money to it. Through his involvement with the society, he became involved in teaching night classes to tradesmen.

In 1839, he wrote Faith Revived and Piety Reanimated Through the Eucharist. Often while visiting the estate of his uncle, M. de Beauchamp, he would stop by the nearby Solesmes Abbey, where he became a close friend of Dom Prosper Guéranger. After making pilgrimages to a couple of Marian shrines in Normandy, in 1842 he published a guidebook on Marian shrines.

In 1847, he made a pilgrimage to La Salette, then to the Grande Chartreuse, and later met with Jean Vianney. Every year Dupont would send his mother and daughter to the salt-baths at Saint-Servan, and later join them. He also took Henrietta, at her request, to see Mont-Saint-Michel. Henrietta was a student at the Ursuline Convent in Tours. When an epidemic broke out the students were sent home, but Henrietta soon took ill and despite Bretonneau's best efforts, died at the age of fifteen. Dupont donated a large part of what would have been his daughter's dowry to Jeanne Jugan, whom he had met in Saint-Servan. He invited her to establish a house for the Little Sisters of the Poor in Tours. Thereafter he remained a frequent contributor to the Little Sisters' charity for the poor and the elderly.

In 1849, he helped establish nightly Eucharistic adoration in Tours, with friends from the Society of Saint Vincent de Paul. His reputation as a Catholic activist and a helper of the poor spread within France and he was in contact with other French Catholics such as Saint Peter Julian Eymard, who was also an active proponent of spreading devotion to the Holy Eucharist. Dupont's charitable works and religious stance became so well known in France that he received many letters, often addressed to "The Holy Man of Tours" and the postmen knew where to deliver them.

When Dupont came to Tours, the cult of Martin of Tours had almost completely fallen into disuse. Two roads covered the location of St Martin's tomb, purposely constructed to obliterate the memory of St. Martin. Martin of Tours was, for Leo Dupont, the model of charity, and he desired to restore devotion to the Bishop of Tours, and begin the process for the eventual rebuilding of his basilica that had been destroyed by the Revolutionaries. Around 1848, following the suggestions of Mr. Dupont, the Cathedral of Tours began to restore the festivities surrounding the Feast of St. Martin on 11 November. He helped rebuild the Basilica of Saint Martin, Tours (which traces back to 472).

Dupont also promoted the use of the Saint Benedict Medal. He was never without several on his person, which he would give to those he might meet. He purchased them by the thousands and distributed them widely.

Dupont's mother lived with him most of his life in Tours and she died in 1860.

== Holy Face devotions ==
Apart from his charitable activities, Dupont is perhaps best known for spreading devotion to the Holy Face of Jesus.

Dupont made frequent donations to the Carmelites in Tours and managed their business affairs. He thus heard of the reported visions of Jesus and Mary by the Carmelite nun Mary of Saint Peter from 1844 to 1847. Mary of Saint Peter was portress of the Carmel. They had in common a devotion to the Infant Jesus; Mary of Saint Peter would give Dupont copies of The Little Gospel which he would then distribute.

Based on this, Dupont started to burn a vigil lamp continuously before a picture of the Holy Face of Jesus based on the painted image on the Veil of Veronica. Dupont used that image because the existence of a clear image on the Shroud of Turin was not known to anyone at that time for the somewhat faded image of the face on the Shroud can not easily be seen with the naked eye and was only observed in May 1898 via the negative plate of Secondo Pia's first photograph.

In 1851, Dupont formed the Archconfraternity of the Holy Face in Tours. He prayed for and promoted the case for a devotion to the Holy Face of Jesus for around 30 years. In 1874 Charles-Théodore Colet was appointed Archbishop of Tours. Archbishop Colet examined the documents pertaining to the life of Mary of Saint Peter and the devotion and in 1876 gave permission for them to be published and the devotion encouraged, shortly before Dupont died. After Dupont's death, the archbishop turned his oratory into a chapel, the Oratory of the Holy Face.

== Death and veneration ==
By the end of his life, Dupont had donated most of his fortune to a number of charities, from the Carmelites to various orphanages, Society of Saint Vincent de Paul and the Little Sisters of the Poor.

Leo Dupont died in 1876, aged 79. Upon his death, his house on Rue St. Etienne was purchased by the Archdiocese of Tours and turned into the Oratory of the Holy Face. Archbishop Colet approved of a congregation, called the Priests of the Holy Face, to administer to the chapel. The congregation was canonically erected in 1876 and Father Peter Javier, a friend of Dupont, was appointed as its director.

Father Javier wrote a biography of Dupont and one of Mary of St Peter and the devotion to the Holy Face. These books were widely distributed and started the spread of the devotion. Years later, the books influenced Therese of Lisieux. The devotion to the Holy Face of Jesus was approved by Pope Leo XIII in 1885.

Dupont's spiritual writings were approved by theologians on 3 February 1937. The case for his canonization was presented to the Congregation for the Causes of Saints on 21 June 1939, granting him the title of Servant of God. The Holy See later declared him Venerable and he now awaits beatification. His feast day is 1 December.

== Legacy ==
The devotion to the Holy Face of Jesus that Dupont promoted continued to flourish after his death. In the 1930s, an Italian nun, Sister Maria Pierina, associated the image of the Holy Face of Jesus from the Shroud of Turin with the devotion. Pope Pius XII approved the new image in 1958 and declared the Feast of the Holy Face of Jesus as Shrove Tuesday (the Tuesday before Ash Wednesday) for all Roman Catholics.

1950 saw the foundation of the Benedictine Sisters of Reparation of the Holy Face, whose aim is an "unceasing effort to stand beside the endless crosses on which the Son of God continues to be crucified".

Dupont's efforts in spreading the devotion to the Holy Face of Jesus are chronicled in the book The Holy Man of Tours, of A.D.1990, by Dorothy Scallan. Events of his life are also recorded by Abbé Pierre-Désiré Janvier in The Holy Man of Tours: Or the life of Léon Papin-Dupont of A.D. 1882.

== Sources ==
- Scallan, Dorothy (1990). The Holy Man of Tours. Tan Books and Publishers. ISBN 0-89555-390-2.
- Cruz, Joan Carroll (2003). Saintly Men of Modern Times. Our Sunday Visitor. ISBN 1-931709-77-7.
- Janvier, Pierre Désiré (2008). The Life of Leon Papin-Dupont: the Holy Man of Tours. Kessinger Publishing. ISBN 978-1-4365-4333-0.
