= Visions of Jesus and Mary =

Claims to have seen Jesus or his mother Mary

The Incredulity of Saint Thomas by Caravaggio, 1601–02

A number of people have claimed to have had visions of Jesus Christ and personal conversations with him. Some people make similar claims regarding his mother, Mary. Discussions about the authenticity of these visions have often invited controversy. The Catholic Church endorses a fraction of these claims, and various visionaries it accepts have achieved beatification, or even sainthood.

The first reported visions of Christ, and personal conversations with him, after his resurrection and prior to his ascension are found in the New Testament. One of the most widely recalled resurrection appearances of Jesus is the doubting Thomas conversation (John 20:24–29) between Jesus and Thomas the Apostle after his death.

== Acceptance and impact ==
Author Michael Freze argues that Catholic practices such as Eucharistic adoration, rosary devotions and contemplative meditation with a focus on interior life facilitate visions and apparitions.

In recent centuries, people reporting visions of Jesus and Mary have been of diverse backgrounds: laity and clergy, young and old, Catholics and Protestants, the devout and the previously non-believing. Visions should be differentiated from interior locutions such as those purportedly experienced by Consolata Betrone, in which inner voices are reported, but no visual or physical contact is claimed.

=== Vatican guidelines ===
The Sacred Congregation for the Doctrine of the Faith at the Vatican has published a detailed set of steps for "Judging Alleged Apparitions and Revelations" that claim supernatural origin. The reported visions of Jesus and Mary by Benoîte Rencurel in Saint-Étienne-le-Laus in France from 1664 to 1718 were only recognized by the Holy See in May 2008, making them the first Marian apparitions and visions of Jesus to be approved in the 21st century. According to the priest Salvatore M. Perrella of the Marianum Pontifical Institute in Rome, this is the 12th Marian apparition approved by the Holy See from a total of 295 that have been studied through the centuries.

=== Controversies ===
Over the years, a number of people, for the sake of monetary gain, have claimed to converse with Jesus and been exposed. A well-known example was Protestant televangelist Peter Popoff who often claimed to receive messages from God to heal people on stage. Popoff was exposed in 1987 when intercepted messages from his wife to a small radio receiver hidden in his ear were replayed on The Tonight Show Starring Johnny Carson.

Messages from Jesus reported by Catalina Rivas were later found to correspond to exact pages of books previously written by other authors (e.g. José Prado Flores), and published instructional literature for Catholic seminarians.

Reported Marian messages from Veronica Lueken were declared invalid by Bishop Francis Mugavero of the Roman Catholic Diocese of Brooklyn and reports of Our Lady of Surbiton claiming that Mary appeared every day under a pine tree in England were flatly rejected by the Vatican as a fraud.

In December 1906, during the reign of Pope Pius X the former Polish nun Feliksa Kozlowska became the first woman in history to be excommunicated by name as a heretic. Some visions of Jesus have simply been classified as hallucinations by the church, while in a few cases the church has chosen to remain silent on the authenticity of claimed visions.

Some of the reported visions of Jesus simply fade away by virtue of predictions that fail to materialize. Messages from Jesus reported by John Leary in Rochester, New York, in 1999 had predicted that Pope John Paul II would be forced out of Rome and sent into exile amid chaos. A commission appointed by Bishop Matthew Clark of the Roman Catholic Diocese of Rochester Matthew H. Clark in 1999 unanimously found Leary's messages to be riddled with doctrinal errors and of human origin.

=== Influence ===
Despite the expected controversies, post-Ascension visions of Jesus and the Virgin Mary have, in fact, played a key role in the direction of the Catholic Church, e.g. the formation of the Franciscan order and the devotions to the Holy Rosary, the Holy Face of Jesus and the Sacred Heart of Jesus.

From 1673 to 1675, Marguerite Marie Alacoque recounted a series of visions of Christ speaking to her. This led her to promote Devotion of the Sacred Heart. She was declared a saint in 1920 and the Feast of the Sacred Heart is celebrated 19 days after Pentecost.

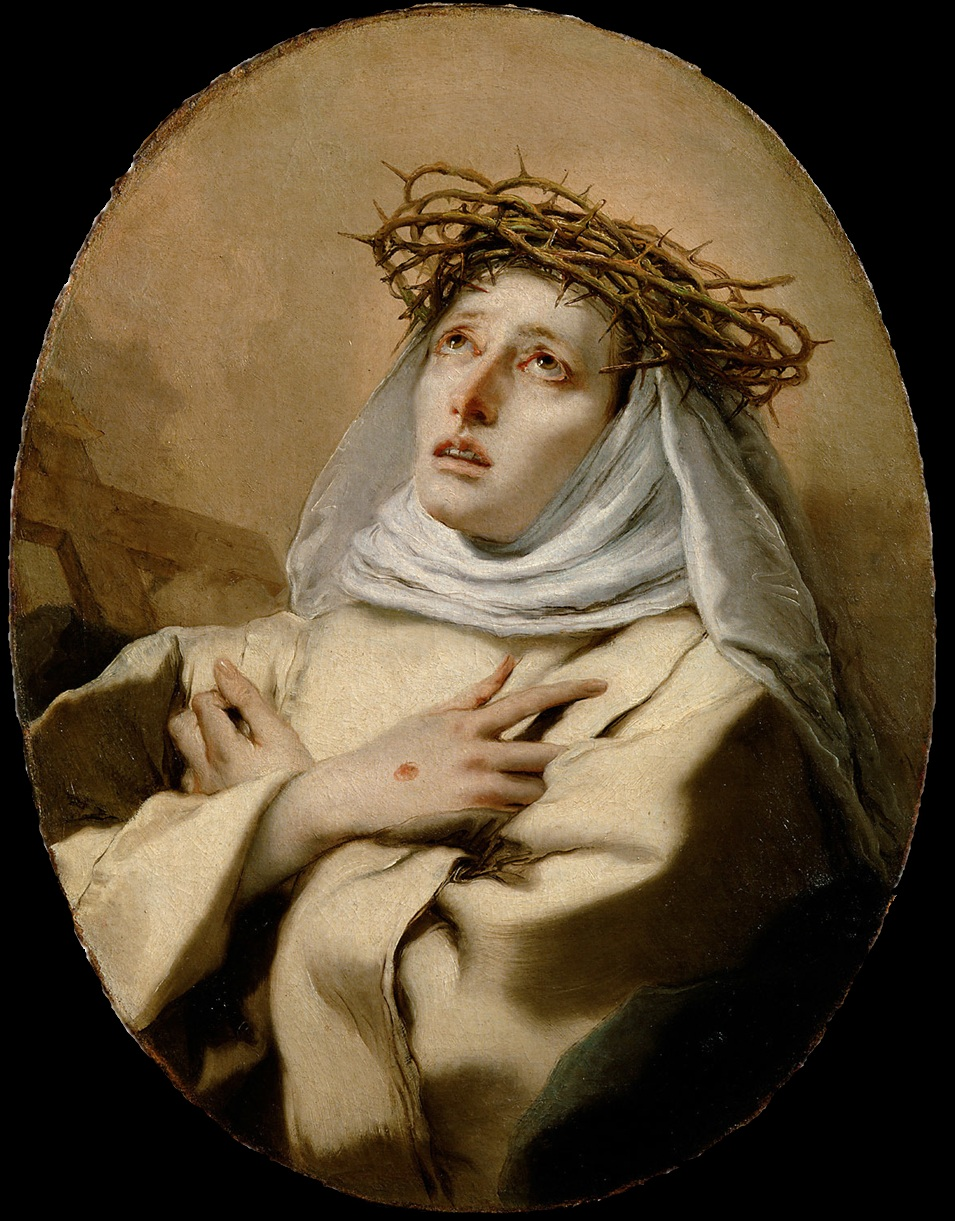
Saint Catherine of Siena, Doctor of the Church by Tiepolo, c. 1746

Catherine of Siena was a Dominican tertiary who lived, fasted and prayed at home in Siena Italy. In 1370 she reported a vision in which she was commanded to abandon her life of solitude and to make an impact on the world. She corresponded with Pope Gregory XI and other people in authority, begging for peace and for the reformation of the clergy, writing over 300 letters. Her arguments, and her trip to Avignon, eventually became instrumental in the decision of Pope Gregory XI to return the Avignon Papacy to Rome where she was summoned to live until her death. She is one of only four female Doctors of the Church.

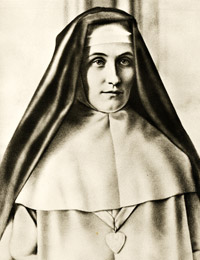
Mary of the Divine Heart

Reported messages from Jesus have also influenced papal actions and encyclicals. The 1899 consecration of the world to the Sacred Heart of Jesus by Pope Leo XIII in the encyclical Annum sacrum was due in part to the messages from Jesus reported by a Sister of the Good Shepherd, Mary of the Divine Heart. Pope Leo XIII performed the requested consecration a few days after the death of Sister Mary and called it "the greatest act of my pontificate".

=== Pilgrimages ===
Churches and sanctuaries built based on reported visions of Jesus and Mary attract many millions of pilgrims each year. According to Bishop Francesco Giogia the majority of the most visited Catholic shrines in the world are vision based, in that with about 10 million pilgrims, the Basilica of Our Lady of Guadalupe, in Mexico City, was the most visited Catholic shrine in the world in 1999, now followed by the Sanctuary of Our Lady of Fátima, in Cova da Iria, Portugal, with between 6 and 8 million pilgrims per year. The Padre Pio of Pietrelcina's sanctuary in San Giovanni Rotondo, in Italy, and the Basilica of Our Lady of Aparecida in Brazil, received each about 6 to 7 million pilgrims per year, followed by the Sanctuary of Our Lady of Lourdes, in France, with 5 million visitors per year.

== Visions of the early saints ==
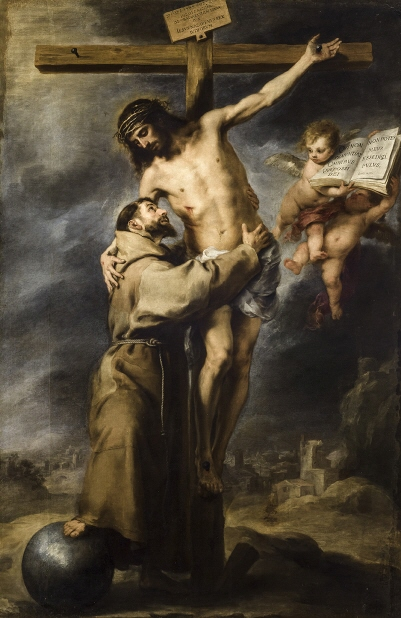
Saint Francis embracing Christ on the Cross, by Murillo, 1668.

The Bible includes primarily pre-Ascension visions of Jesus, except for the vision of Christ by Saint Stephen in Acts 7:55, and the conversation between Jesus and Ananias in Damascus in which Ananias is ordered to heal Paul (Acts 9:10–18).

In 1205, while praying in the Church of San Damiano just outside Assisi, Francis of Assisi reported a vision in which an image of Jesus purportedly spoke to him: "Francis, Francis, go and repair My house which, as you can see, is falling into ruins." This vision led Francis to renounce his merchant family, embrace poverty and form the Franciscan order.

Starting in 1208, Juliana of Liege had visions of Christ which she kept a secret for almost 20 years. In these visions she was reportedly told to institute a solemn feast for the Blessed Sacrament as the Body of Christ. When she eventually reported her visions to her confessor, the information was relayed to the bishop. Years later, in 1264, in the papal bull Transiturus de hoc mundo Pope Urban IV (who was formerly the Archdeacon of Liege) formally declared the feast of Corpus Christi as the first papally sanctioned universal feast for the Latin Rite.

In 1372, the English anchorite and saint, Julian of Norwich was on her deathbed and had been given her last rites when she reported a series of visions of Jesus, followed by a sudden recovery. Almost twenty years later she wrote about these visions in her book "Revelations of Divine Love” perhaps the first book in the English language written by a woman. Her book mentions her illness, her recovery as she saw the image of Christ and her understanding that Christ still dwells in the souls of those who love him. She is celebrated in the Anglican Church.

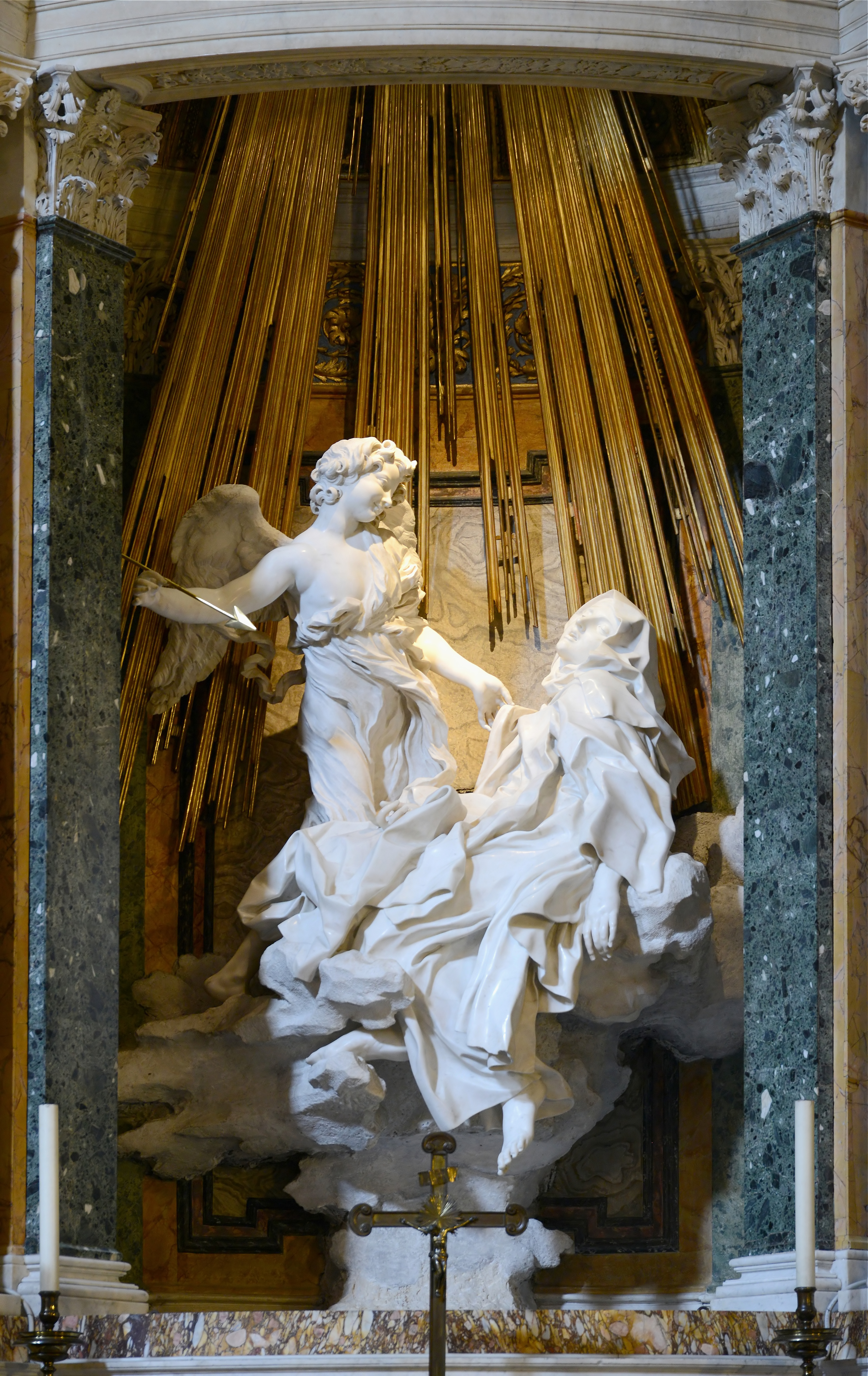
Ecstasy of Saint Teresa

On St. Peter's Day in 1559, Teresa of Avila (Teresa de Jesús) reported a vision of Jesus present to her in bodily form. For almost two years thereafter she reported similar visions. Teresa's visions transformed her life and she became a key figure in the Catholic Church eventually being recognized as one of only four female Doctors of the Church. One of her visions is the subject of Bernini's famous work The Ecstasy of Saint Teresa in the basilica of Santa Maria della Vittoria, Rome.

In the early 17th century, María de Jesús de Ágreda reported a number of mystical experiences, visions and conversations with Mary. She stated that Mary had inspired and dictated passages in the book Mystical City of God as a biography of the Virgin Mary. However, the book (which makes a number of somewhat unusual claims) has remained controversial within the Roman Catholic church, having been banned and restored a number of times, and her process of beatification (started in 1673) has not been completed.

At her profession as a Capuchin Poor Clare nun in 1678, Veronica Giuliani expressed a great desire to suffer in union with the crucified Jesus for the conversion of sinners. Shortly after that time she reported a series of visions of Jesus and the Virgin Mary that lasted a number of years. She reported a vision of Christ bearing his cross and of the chalice symbolizing the Passion of Christ. On Good Friday 1697 she received the five wounds of Christ as stigmata.

Mary is traditionally said to have appeared to the English Carmelite priest Simon Stock in 1251, and given him the Carmelite habit, the Brown Scapular. "The question then, from a historical perspective, is not whether Mary appeared to Simon Stock and gave him the scapular, but rather did Simon Stock perceive the Mother of God bestowing this sign of her protection on him and his brothers in Carmel."

== 19th-century visions ==
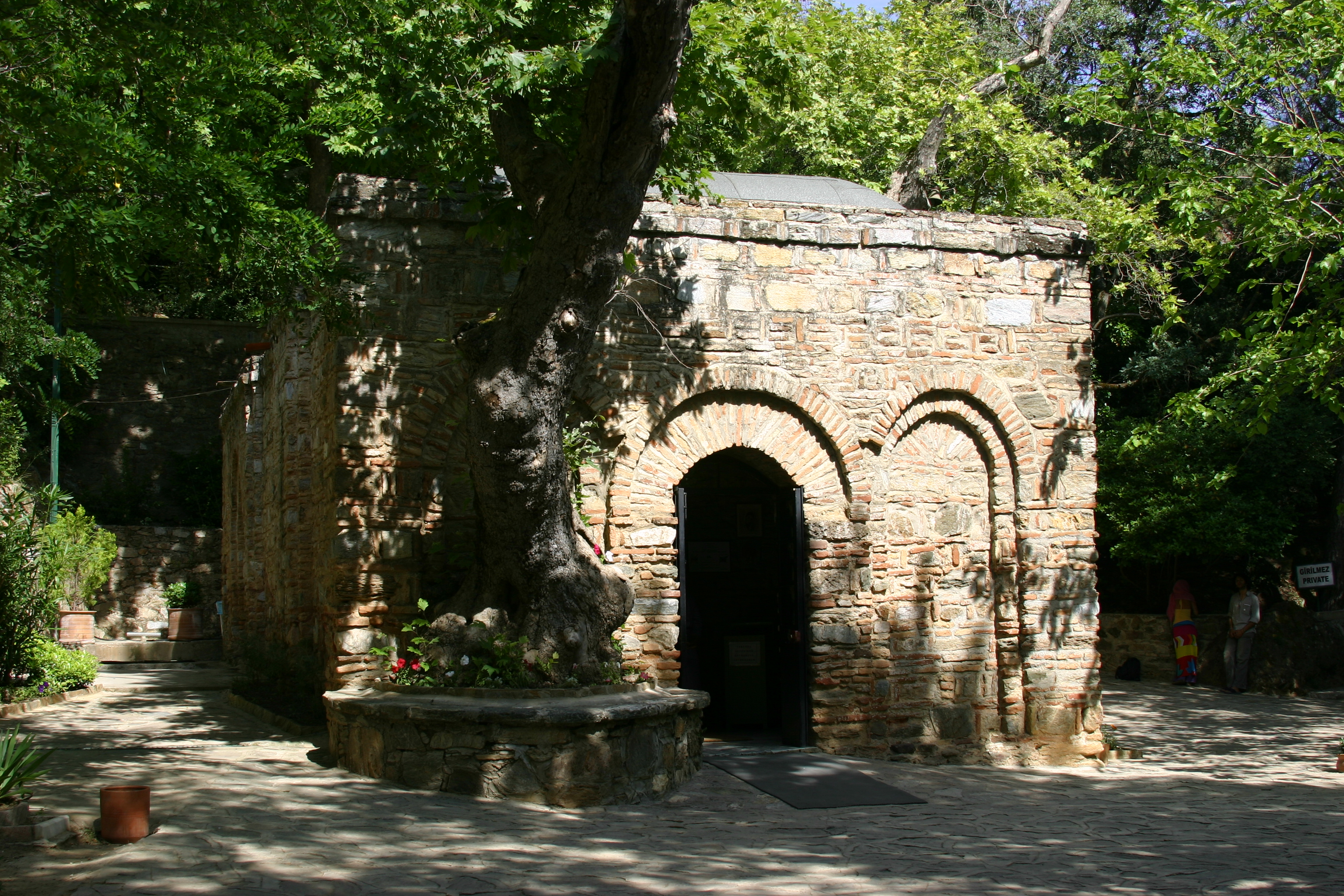
The House of the Virgin Mary on Ephesus, Turkey.

Anne Catherine Emmerich was a German Augustinian nun who lived from 1774 to 1824. She was bedridden as of 1813 and is said to have had visible stigmata which would reopen on Good Friday. She reported that since childhood she had visions in which she talked with Jesus. In 1819 the poet Clemens Brentano was inspired to visit her and began to write her visions in his words, with her approval. In 1833, after her death, the book The Dolorous Passion of Our Lord Jesus Christ was released by Brentano and was used in part by Mel Gibson for his movie The Passion of the Christ in 2004. In 1852 the book The Life of The Blessed Virgin Mary was published. Emmerich's visions allegedly led a French priest Julien Gouyet to discover a house near Ephesus in Turkey in 1881. This house is assumed by some Catholics and some Muslims to be the House of the Virgin Mary. The Holy See has taken no official position on the authenticity of the discovery yet, but in 1896 Pope Leo XIII visited it and in 1951 Pope Pius XII initially declared the house a Holy Place. Pope John XXIII later made the declaration permanent. Pope Paul VI in 1967, Pope John Paul II in 1979 and Pope Benedict XVI in 2006 visited the house.

In 1820, Joseph Smith, Jr., founder of the Latter Day Saint movement, reported that God the Father and Jesus appeared to him in a vision in the woods near his home in rural New York. This led to a series of other manifestations through which he claimed to receive divine instruction, authority, and power to restore the true Church of Jesus Christ to the world. He also claimed to receive a vision of Jesus while in the Kirtland Temple on April 3, 1836. His record of the revelation has since become known as the 110th section of the Doctrine and Covenants.

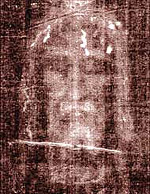
Secondo Pia's 1898 negative of the image on the Shroud of Turin, used in the devotion to the Holy Face of Jesus.

In 1843 Mary of Saint Peter, a Discalced Carmelite nun in Tours, France reported visions of conversations with Jesus and the Virgin Mary in which she was urged to spread the devotion to the Holy Name of Jesus and to the Holy Face of Jesus, in reparation for the many insults Jesus suffered in his Passion. This resulted in the Golden Arrow prayer. The devotion was further spread from Tours partly by the efforts of Leo Dupont (also called the Apostle of the Holy Face) and influenced Thérèse of Lisieux.

Marie Martha Chambon.

In December 1844, Ellen Gould Harmon (later married name White), co-founder of the Seventh Day Adventist movement, while kneeling at a prayer meeting at the house of Mrs. Haines on Ocean Street in South Portland, Maine, experienced a vision of Jesus Christ. Ellen felt the power of God come upon her and was soon lost to her surroundings. She experienced over one hundred visions which she published as broadside, letters, or incorporated into her religious writings. The Seventh-day Adventist Church, which by 2020 had 21 million modern world-wide followers, is based largely on her interpretations of Christian subjects found in her numerous writings. She was one of the most prolific American women of the nineteenth century, while founding numerous schools, hospitals, medical centers and universities. The Smithsonian Magazine has named her as one of the most significant Americans of all time.

In 1858 Bernadette Soubirous was a 14-year-old shepherd girl who lived near the town of Lourdes in France. One day she reported a vision of a miraculous Lady who identified Herself as the Virgin Mary in subsequent visions. In the first vision she was asked to return again and she had 18 visions overall. Eventually, a number of chapels and churches were built at Lourdes as the Sanctuary of Our Lady of Lourdes – which is now a major Catholic pilgrimage site. One of these churches, the Basilica of St. Pius X can accommodate 25 thousand people and was dedicated by the future Pope John XXIII when he was the Papal Nuncio to France.

In 1866 Marie Martha Chambon began to report visions of Jesus telling her to contemplate the Holy Wounds, although it is said that she had received her first vision when only five years old. She was a member of the Monastery of the Visitation Order who lived in Chambéry, France, and is in the process of canonization by the Roman Catholic Church.

In 1899 Gemma Galgani reported a vision of Jesus after which she experienced recurring stigmata. She reported the vision as follows: “At that moment Jesus appeared with all his wounds open, but from these wounds there no longer came forth blood, but flames of fire. In an instant these flames came to touch my hands, my feet and my heart.” Thereafter she reported receiving the stigmata every week from Thursday night to Saturday morning, during which time she also reported further conversations with Jesus. The Congregation of Rites has so far refrained from making a decision on her stigmata.

== 20th-century visionaries ==
The Franciscan Italian priest Pio of Pietrelcina reported visions of both Jesus and Mary as early as 1910. For a number of years he claimed to have experienced deep ecstasy along with his visions. In 1918, while praying in the Church of Saint Mary of Graces he reported ecstasy and visions which this time left him with permanent and visible stigmata, the five wounds of Christ. The stigmata remained visible on his hands and feet for the next fifty years.

Marie-Julie Jahenny known as "The mystic of La Fraudais".

In 1916, during World War I, Claire Ferchaud – a religious Sister Claire of Jesus Crucified – lived in the Convent of the ‘Rinfilières’ at Loublande, France. At that time, she claimed to have been given a vision of Christ himself showing his heart "slashed by the sins of mankind" and crossed by a deeper wound still, atheism. On 12 March 1920, however, a decree of the Holy Office disavowed her revelations and stated that belief in the visions of Loublande could not be approved. The Archbishop of Paris, Cardinal Léon-Adolphe Amette declared that regretfully he was unable to discover a supernatural inspiration in her statements.

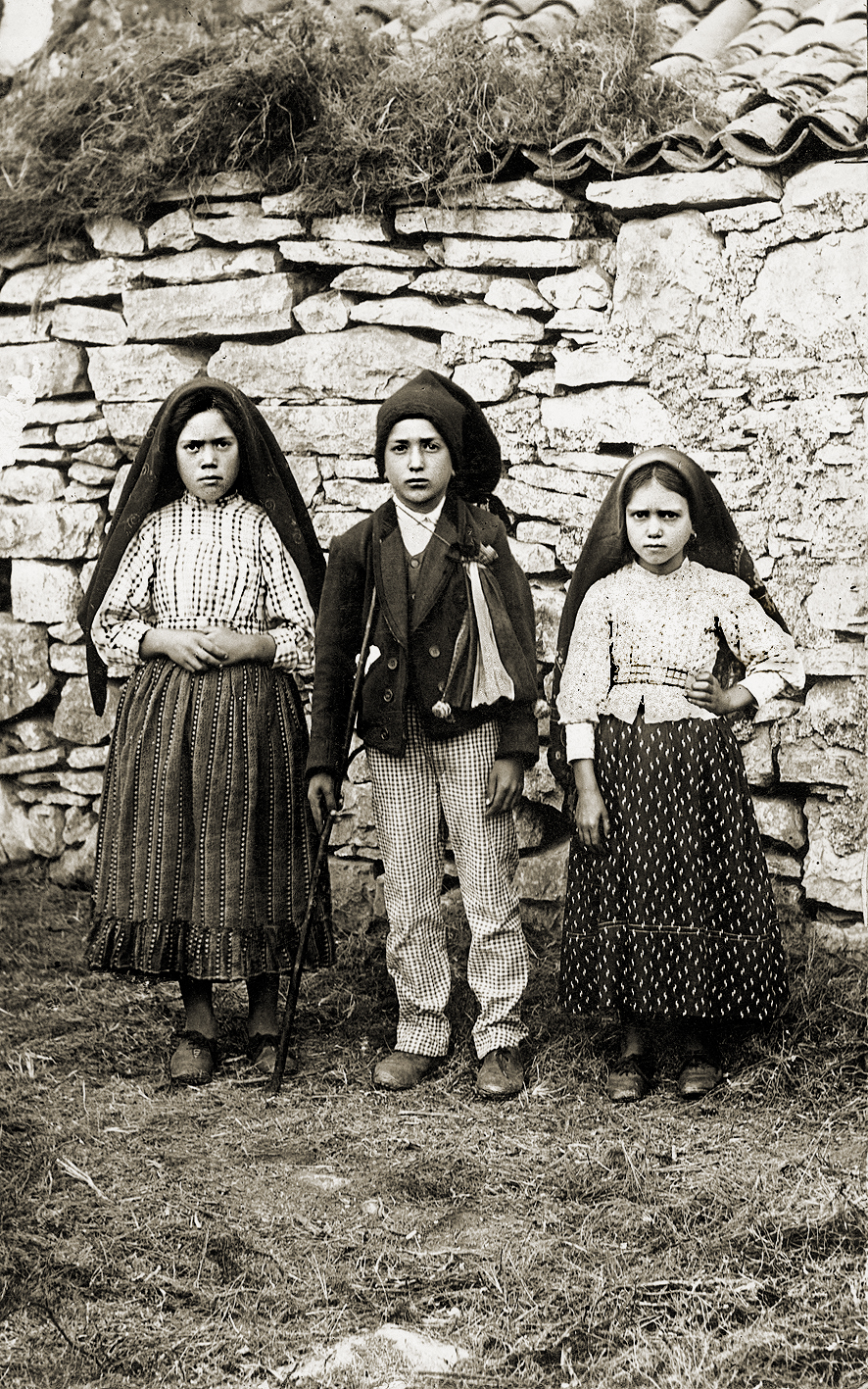
Lúcia Santos (left) with her cousins Francisco and Jacinta Marto, 1917

The visions of the Virgin Mary appearing to three shepherd children at Fátima, Portugal, in 1917 were declared "worthy of belief" by the Catholic Church in 1930 but Catholics at large are not formally required to believe them. However, seven popes – Pius XII, John XXIII, Paul VI, John Paul I, John Paul II, Benedict XVI and Francis – have supported the Fátima messages as supernatural. John Paul I met with Sister Lúcia on July 11, 1977 while he was still Cardinal Patriarch of Venice. He reported being deeply moved by the experience, and vowed to perform the Consecration of Russia as Lucia said Mary had asked. Pope John Paul II was particularly attached to Fátima and credited Our Lady of Fátima with saving his life after he was shot in Rome on the Feast Day of Our Lady of Fátima in May 1981. He donated the bullet that wounded him on that day to the Roman Catholic Sanctuary of Fátima, in Portugal. Every year on May 13 and October 13, the significant dates of Fátima apparitions, pilgrims fill the country road that leads to the Sanctuary of Our Lady of Fátima with crowds that approach one million on each day.

In the 1930s, several apparitions and messages given by Jesus and Mary, under the title of Our Lady of Tears, were reported in the city of Campinas, Brazil. In that same decade, the local bishop gave his approval to these same apparitions, messages and devotions – the Medal and the Chaplet of Our Lady of Tears – derived from them.

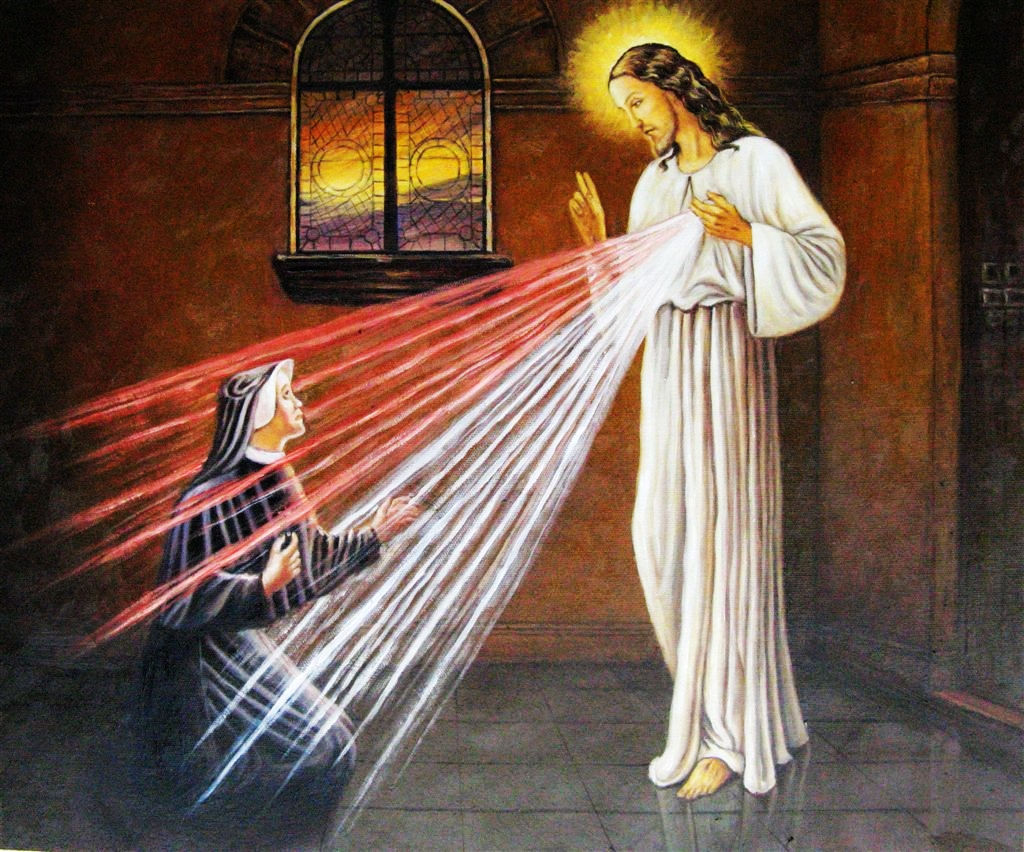
Painting depicting the apparition of the Merciful Jesus to Saint Faustina

The Holy See has, at times, reversed its position on some visions. In 1931 Faustina Kowalska reported visions of a conversation with Jesus when she was a Polish nun. This resulted in the Chaplet of Divine Mercy as a prayer and later an institution which was condemned by the Holy See in 1958. However, further investigation resulted in her beatification in 1993 and canonization in 2000. Her conversations with Jesus are recorded in her diary, published as "Divine Mercy in My Soul" – passages from which are at times quoted by the Vatican. Divine Mercy Sunday is now officially celebrated as the first Sunday after Easter.

On the first Friday in Lent 1936, Maria Pierina De Micheli, a nun born near Milan in Italy, reported a vision in which Jesus told her: “I will that My Face, which reflects the intimate pains of My Spirit, the suffering and the love of My Heart, be more honored. He who meditates upon Me, consoles Me”. Further visions reportedly urged her to make a medal with the Holy Face. In 1958, Pope Pius XII confirmed the Feast of the Holy Face of Jesus as Shrove Tuesday (the Tuesday before Ash Wednesday) for all Roman Catholics. Maria Pierina De Micheli was beatified by Pope Benedict XVI in 2009.

From 1944 to 1947 the bed ridden Italian writer and mystic Maria Valtorta produced 15,000 handwritten pages of text that she said recorded the visions of her conversations with Jesus about his life and the early church. These pages became the basis of her book The Poem of the Man God. The Catholic Church placed it on the Index of Forbidden Books. While the Index no longer exists, the then-Cardinal Joseph Ratzinger stated in a letter of January 31, 1995 that the condemnation still "retains its moral force", and the Congregation for the Doctrine of the Faith declared that the visions "cannot be considered supernatural in origin."

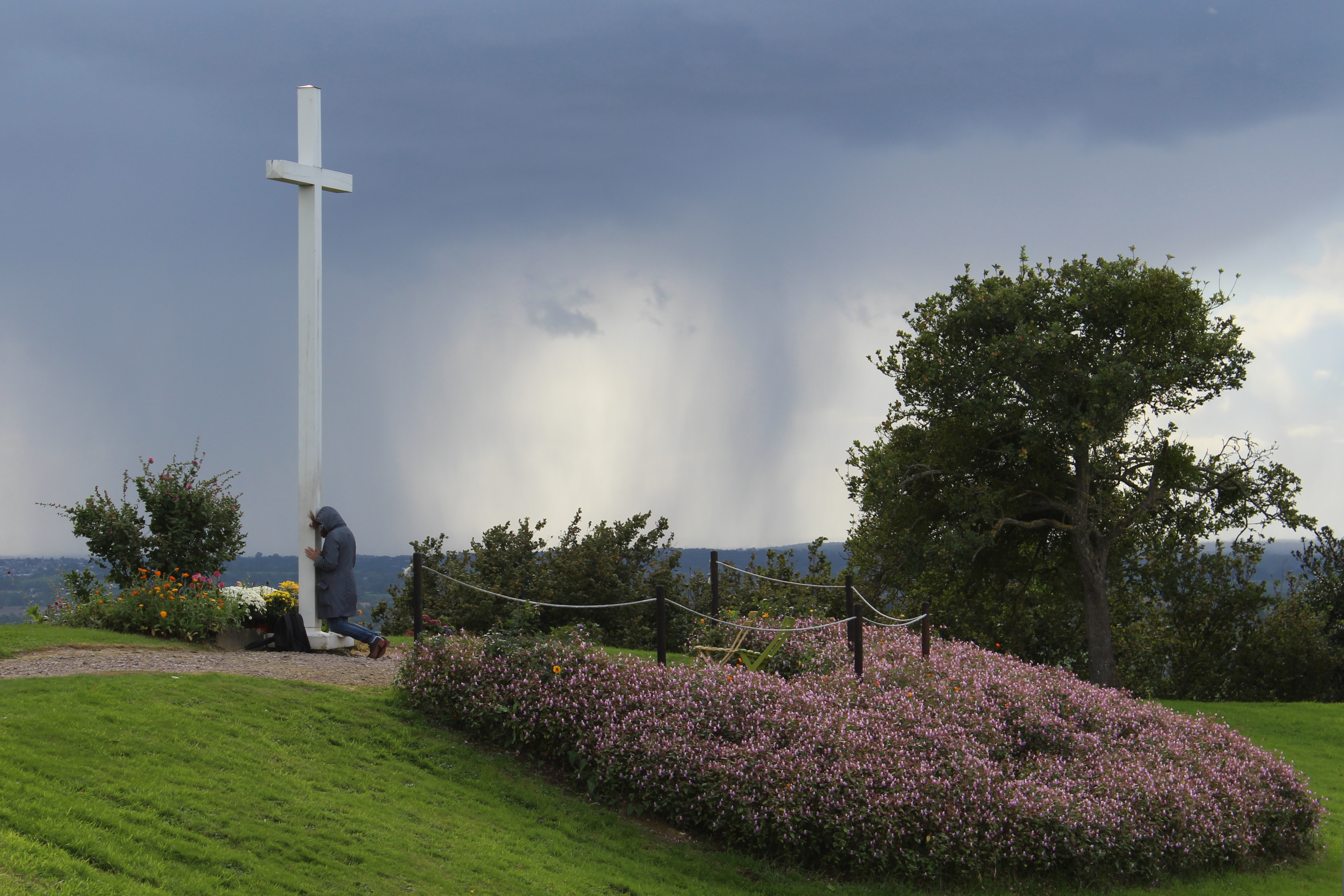
The current Cross of Dozulé in the place of its famous first apparition to Madeleine Aumount in 1972.

Between 1972 and 1978, Jesus Christ is said to have appeared 49 times in Dozulé to Madeleine Aumont, a mother of five children, in the presence of her parish priest Victor L’Horset and other faithful people, and is believed to have dictated a series of messages, containing teachings and of warnings for all people, according to those who believe in them. Among them is the daily «Prayer of Dozulé». The messages are seen as an annunciation of the return of Christ. The followers of the messages of Dozulé believe also that they are the continuation of the Three Secrets of Fátima and that they ask, for the conversion of humanity to avoid a material and spiritual catastrophe.

On August 19, 1982, some teenagers in Kibeho, Rwanda reported visions of Mary and Jesus, as Our Lady of Kibeho. The teenagers reported truly gruesome sights such as rivers of blood and the visions were accompanied by intense reactions: crying, tremors, and comas. Some today regard the visions as an ominous prediction of the Rwandan genocide of 1994, and particularly in that specific location in 1995 in which some of the teenagers died a decade after their vision. The apparitions were approved by the local Roman Catholic bishop and later by the Holy See.

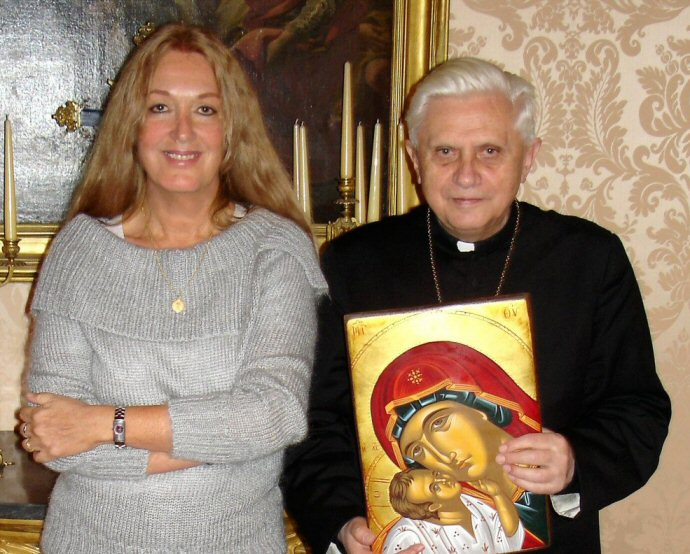
Meeting of Vassula Ryden with the Cardinal Joseph Ratzinger (later Pope Benedict XVI) in the offices of the Congregation for the Doctrine of the Faith (Vatican, November 22, 2004)

As recently as 1985 people such as Vassula Rydén have reported conversations of theirs with Jesus in their books, resulting in interest, discussion and controversy. Rydén's reported conversations with Jesus are published in a series of books called “True Life in God” and have been translated into over 40 languages by volunteers worldwide. In a 1995 notification the Congregation for the Doctrine of the Faith, while recognizing some positive aspects of Ryden's activities, declared that their negative effects meant that dioceses should not provide opportunities for spreading her ideas and that Catholics should not consider her writings to be supernatural. A further letter from the Congregation written on January 25, 2007, by the new Prefect Cardinal William Levada and this time sent worldwide to all the Catholic episcopal conferences, confirmed the 1995 negative doctrinal evaluation of the writings of which it spoke; stated that, in view of the clarifications offered, a case by case judgement should be passed on the possibility for Catholics to read her writings "presented not as divine revelations but rather as her personal meditations"; and declared it inappropriate for Catholics to participate in her prayer groups.

== Living visionaries ==
Among recent visions, the reported apparitions of the Virgin Mary to six children in Medjugorje in 1981 have received the widest amount of attention. The messages of Our Lady of Medjugorje have a very strong following among Catholics worldwide. The Holy See has never officially either approved or disapproved of the messages of Međugorje, although both critical and supportive documents about the messages have been published by various Catholic figures.

For several decades, Agnes Katsuko Sasagawa had encountered many health problems but her health reportedly improved after drinking water from Lourdes. After going totally deaf, she went to live with the nuns in the remote area of Yuzawadai, near the city of Akita. In 1973 she reported messages from the Virgin Mary, as well as stigmata. These purported visions are known as Our Lady of Akita. On April 22, 1984, after eight years of investigations, Rev. John Shojiro Ito, Bishop of Niigata, Japan, recognized "the supernatural character of a series of mysterious events concerning the statue of the Holy Mother Mary" and authorizes "throughout the entire diocese, the veneration of the Holy Mother of Akita, while awaiting that the Holy See publishes definitive judgment on this matter."

In the 1998 book Visions of Jesus Phillip Wiebe chronicled the stories of 30 people from truly diverse backgrounds who claim to have had recent conversations with Jesus. Wiebe analyzed these claims from multiple perspectives, including hallucinations, dreams and real visions.

== Types of visions ==
=== Visions vs dictations ===
Some visionaries merely report conversations and images while others also produce large amounts of handwritten notes. Julian of Norwich wrote a book based on her reported visions; the book was written 20 years after her first vision and she did not declare it to be a dictation. At the other end of the spectrum is the case of Anne Catherine Emmerich who narrated her messages to Clemens Brentano, who transcribed them in his own words. Another case was that of the nun Consolata Betrone who would repeat her reported conversations with Jesus to her confessor Lorenzo Sales. After her death, Sales wrote the book "Jesus Appeals to the World" based on her reported messages.

There have been other mystics who have produced large volumes of text, but considered them meditations rather than visions or interior locutions. For instance, Concepcion Cabrera de Armida's over 60,000 pages of text were never represented as visions, but as her own meditations, often in the presence of the Blessed Sacrament, during Eucharistic Adoration.

=== Physical marks ===
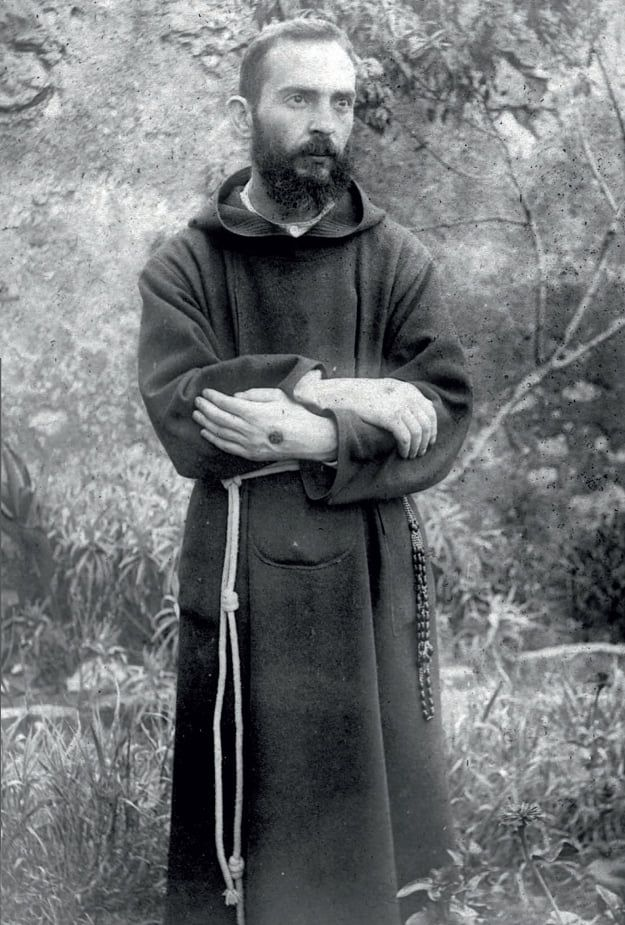
A young Padre Pio with stigmata

Some visionaries report receiving physical signs on their bodies. Francis of Assisi was one of the first reported cases of stigmata, but the best known recent example is a Capuchin friar, Padre Pio of Pietrelcina, one of several Franciscans in history with reported stigmata.

=== Physical contact ===
Some visionaries have reported physical contact with Jesus. The Bible suggests that post-resurrection (yet pre-ascension) physical contact with Jesus is possible, for in John 21:17 Jesus told Mary Magdalene: "Don't touch Me for I have not yet ascended to the Father"". In John 20:27 Jesus ordered Thomas the Apostle: "Put your hand into My side". But the Bible does not mention if Thomas followed that command.

=== Physical artifacts ===
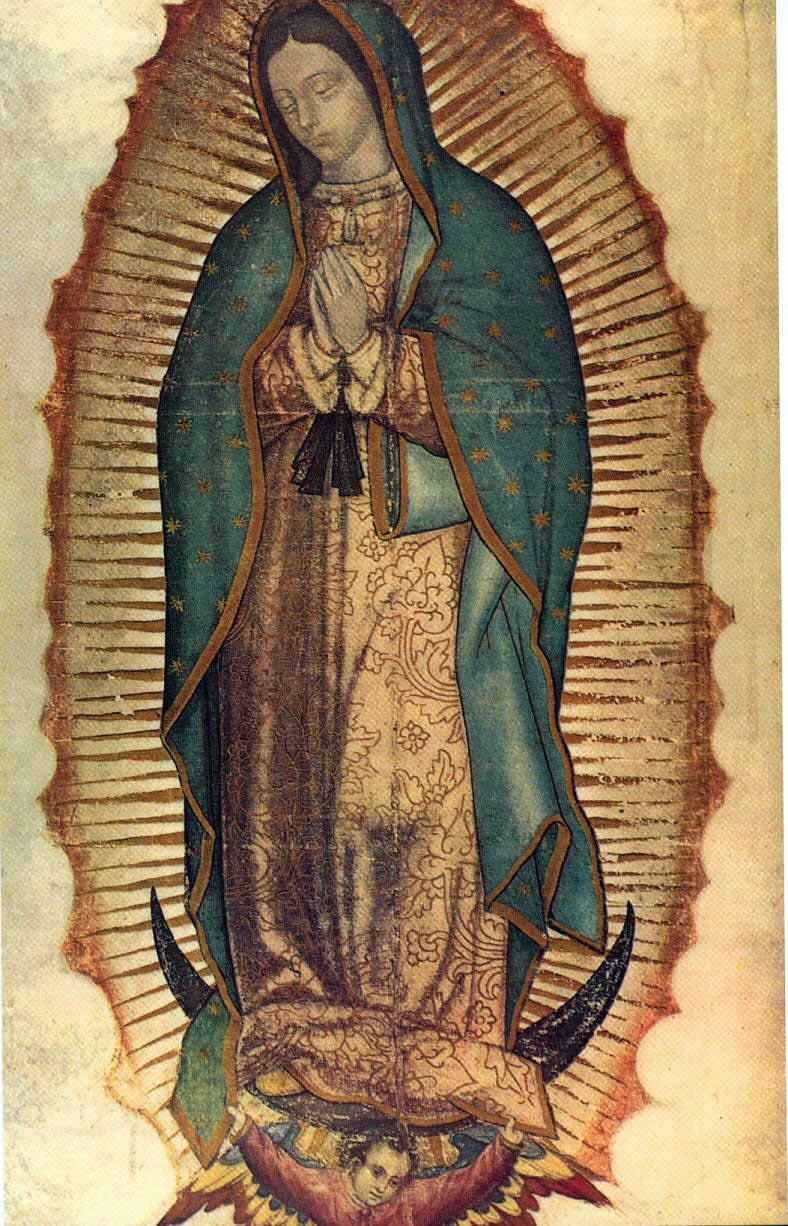
Our Lady of Guadalupe.

Some visionaries produce artifacts based on their reported visions, although this is rare. In 1531, Juan Diego reported an early morning vision of Mary, in which he was instructed to build an abbey on the Hill of Tepeyac in Mexico. The local prelate did not believe his account and asked for a miraculous sign, which was later provided as an icon of Our Lady of Guadalupe permanently imprinted on Diego's cloak in which he had gathered roses. Over the years, Our Lady of Guadalupe became a symbol of the Catholic faith in Mexico. By 1820 when the Mexican War of Independence from Spanish colonial rule ended Our Lady of Guadalupe had come to symbolize the Mexican nation. Today it remains a strong national and religious symbol in Mexico.

== See also ==
- Marian apparition
- Perceptions of religious imagery in natural phenomena
- Private revelation
