= Hildebrand Gregori =

Italian Benedictine monk (1894 – 1985)

Venerable Hildebrand Gregori O.S.B. Silv.

Priest and abbot
- Born: Alfredo Gregori; 8 May 1894; Carsoli, Province of L'Aquila, Kingdom of Italy
- Died: 12 November 1985 (aged 91); Rome, Italy
- Venerated in: Catholic Church (Diocese of Rome & Order of St. Benedict)

Hildebrand Gregori, O.S.B. Silv., (8 May 1894 – 12 November 1985), was an Italian Benedictine monk, who served as the Abbot General of the Sylvestrine congregation of the Order. He was instrumental in the care of the many orphans left in the City of Rome after the destruction of World War II. The cause for his beatification has been accepted by the Holy See, due to which he is honored as Venerable.

== Life ==
He was born Alfredo Gregori in Poggio Cinolfo, part of the town of Carsoli in the Province of L'Aquila. At age twelve, Gregori joined the Sylvestrines, a branch of the Benedictines. He began his novitiate in 1909 taking the name of Ildebrando (Hildebrand). He was ordained a priest in 1922.

In 1939 he was elected Abbot General of the congregation, and as such was based at the monastery of Santo Stefano del Cacco in Rome, General Motherhouse of the Order. It was at Rome that he met Mother Maria Pierina De Micheli and developed a devotion to the Holy Face of Jesus.

The abbot was moved at the plight of the many orphans and street children he saw in Rome during World War II. He began to provide shelter for young boys in the monastery, and in 1942 he founded the Monastero San Vincenzo at Bassano Romano where a small community of monks cared for the boys. He envisioned, though, a community of Religious Sisters who would undertake this task.

In 1950, Gregori formed the Prayerful Sodality, which in 1977 became the Benedictine Sisters of the Reparation of the Holy Face. He directed his spiritual daughters to the "charism of reparation," understood as an act of love against the "sin of social injustice". Currently the Sisters have 14 communities in Italy, one in Poland, one in Romania, two in India, and one in the Democratic Republic of the Congo.

On 27 September 2000, the 50th anniversary of the religious congregation he had founded, Gregori was honored by an official letter from Pope John Paul II to Cardinal Fiorenzo Angelini.

Gregori died at his monastery in November 1985.

== Veneration ==
The 7 November 2014 was then declared Venerable by Pope Francis.
