= Robert II (bishop of Tours) =

French bishop

Robert II was bishop of Tours from 916 to 931.

Robert had gone to Rome and was returning to his diocese. In the Alps he and his companions were attacked by brigands and slain.

== Sources ==
- Flodoard of Reims, Annals of Flodoard of Reims, tran. Steven Fanning and Bernard S. Bachrach. (Orchard Park, New York: Broadview Press, 2004) p. 20
