= Gaetano Catanoso =

Italian Catholic priest (1879–1963)

Saint Gaetano Catanoso
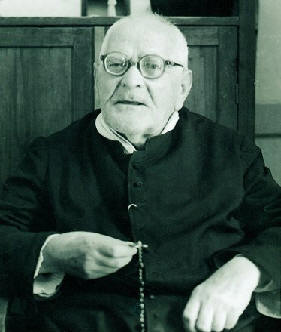
- Photograph

Priest
- Born: 14 February 1879; Chorio di San Lorenzo, Reggio Calabria, Calabria
- Died: 4 April 1963 (aged 84); Reggio Calabria, Italy
- Venerated in: Catholic Church
- Beatified: 4 May 1997, Saint Peter's Square, Vatican City by Pope John Paul II
- Canonized: 23 October 2005, Saint Peter's Square, Vatican City by Pope Benedict XVI
- Feast: 4 April
- Attributes: Priest's attire; Rosary
- Patronage: Suore Veroniche del Santo Volto; Reggio Calabria; Fuengirola; Calabrian priests; Chaplains

Gaetano Catanoso (14 February 1879 – 4 April 1963) was an Italian Catholic priest and the founder of the Suore Veroniche del Santo Volto (1934). Catanoso served as a parish priest in two different parishes for his entire ecclesial life and was an ardent devotee of the Face of Jesus which he promoted to the faithful. He also founded the Poor Clerics to encourage vocations to the priesthood while forming the Confraternita del Santo Volto (1920) to spread devotion to the Face of Jesus. He dedicated his pastoral career to bringing the Gospel message to all people and hiked or rode on a mule to reach distant and surrounding mountain villages in order to evangelize to people.

His fame for holiness was widespread during his life for people hailed his remarkable qualities and the conduct in which he led his life. The cause for his canonization was introduced on 15 October 1981 and he became titled as a Servant of God while he was later named as Venerable on 3 March 1990 upon the confirmation of his model life of heroic virtue. Pope John Paul II beatified Catanoso on 4 May 1997 while Pope Benedict XVI later canonized the late priest in Saint Peter's Square on 23 October 2005.

== Life ==
Gaetano Catanoso was born in 1879 to prosperous landowners in Reggio Calabria as the third of eight children of Antonio Catanoso and Antonia Tripodi.

In October 1889 he began his studies for the priesthood and he arrived with his father in the evening for him to be admitted into it though he had to return home several times due to bouts of ill health. In 1895 he donned the cassock for the first time and gave his first-ever sermon. He received his ordination to the priesthood on 20 September 1902 from Cardinal Gennaro Portanova and served as a parish priest for his entire ecclesial life; from 1902 until March 1904 he served as the prefect of seminarians. His first parish was in the remote hill village of Pentedattilo where he served from March 1904 until 1921. He was passionate about emulating the life of Jesus Christ in his service to the poor and would hike or ride on a mule to the distant and surrounding mountain villages to bring the message of the Gospel and hope to isolated people in desperate circumstances. To help him in this cause he founded an order of nuns known as the Suore Veroniche del Santo Volto in December 1934. From 1922 until 1949 he was the spiritual director to seminarians and from 1922 to 1933 was a chaplain at hospitals in the region. From 1921 to 1950 he served as a confessor to religious institutes and to the prison while from 1940 to 1963 he was the canon of the archdiocesan cathedral.

The order established schools and also homes for the old in small places like San Lorenzo and Roccaforte as well as Chorio to educate children and care for the old and sick. The goal was to combat ignorance and the Mafia through education and the word of God. Catanoso also founded the Poor Clerics to encourage vocations to the priesthood. He was transferred to the larger parish of Santa Maria de la Candelaria in Reggio Calabria on 2 February 1921. Catanoso was a close friend of Annibale Maria di Francia and Luigi Orione whom he had met in 1918. It was Orione who encouraged Catanoso when the latter decided to establish a religious congregation of his own; his order received diocesan approval on 25 March 1958.

Catanoso had a deep devotion to the Face of Christ and to that end formed the "Confraternita del Santo Volto" in 1919. He also revived Marian and Eucharistic devotions and improved catechesis while also working for the observance of liturgical feasts. Catanoso also worked for cooperation among local priests to provide missions via preaching and hearing confessions in each other's parishes. He often spent long hours in silent reflection before the Tabernacle and he promoted Eucharistic Adoration among the faithful. In 1943 he opened a makeshift orphanage for those children who were orphaned due to World War II.

Catanoso died on 4 April 1963 and his final words were recorded as: "In te, Domine, speravi, Gesù, Maria, Giuseppe"; he had become ill and blind before his death though he still welcomed those who came to visit him and seek his counsel. His order in 2008 had 95 nuns in a total of seventeen houses and it would later receive full pontifical approval from Pope John Paul II on 8 December 1980. One American relative – the journalist Justin Catanoso from – Greensboro in North Carolina – wrote memoir about Catanoso and the book is titled: "My Cousin the Saint – A Search for Faith, Family and Miracles".

== Sainthood ==
The beatification process opened on 15 October 1981 after the Congregation for the Causes of Saints issued the official "nihil obstat" (nothing against) and titled Catanoso as a Servant of God. Documentation was sent to the C.C.S. in Rome who validated the process on 3 March 1989 and received the Positio from cause officials in 1989. Theologians met not long after this and approved the cause on 26 September 1989 as did the cardinal and bishop members of the C.C.S. who approved the dossier's contents on 19 December 1989. On 3 March 1990 he was proclaimed to be Venerable after Pope John Paul II confirmed that Catanoso lived a model life of heroic virtue.

For him to be beatified one miracle needed to be investigated and approved; this miracle needed to be a healing that science and medicine were unable to explain. One such case was discovered and investigated in a diocesan process that lasted from 1993 until 1994 when all medical records and witness interrogatories were sent to the C.C.S. who validated the investigation on 10 February 1995. The medical panel of experts approved this miracle on 5 October 1995 as did their consulting theologians on 25 November 1995 and the C.C.S. themselves on 20 February 1996. John Paul II confirmed the healing to be a legitimate miracle on 25 June 1996 and presided over the beatification later on 4 May 1997.

The second and final miracle needed for him to be raised to sainthood was discovered and investigated in 2003 before the documents were sent to Rome and before the C.C.S. validated the process on 14 November 2003. The medical experts approved this healing to be a miracle on 1 April 2004 with the theologians also granting assent on 25 June 2004 as did the C.C.S. on 19 October 2004. John Paul II confirmed this miracle and Catanoso's inevitable sainthood on 20 December 2004. The date for the canonization was formalized at a consistory in the afternoon on 24 February 2005 in which Cardinal Angelo Sodano announced it on the behalf of the ill pope. John Paul II died two months later but his successor Pope Benedict XVI canonized Catanoso on 23 October 2005 in Saint Peter's Square.

Gaetano Catanoso is a patron saint of chaplains.

=== Miracles ===
The miracle that led to his beatification occurred in Reggio-Calabria but was not investigated until a few decades later. It involved the healing of Sister Pauline who on 3 April 1963 wanted to see Catanoso before he died. But the priest died on 4 April she – who suffered from severe asthma – knelt beside his remains and felt healed a few hours later with no breathing difficulties whatsoever.

The miracle that led to his canonization occurred in Reggio-Calabria on 9 January 2003 which was the healing of Anna Pangallo from a rare form of meningitis.

== See also ==
- Leo Dupont, Apostle of the Holy Face
- Holy Face of Jesus
- Maria Pia Mastena
