= Secondo Pia =

Italian lawyer and photographer (1855–1941)

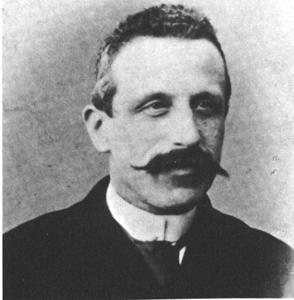
Secondo Pia

Secondo Pia (9 September 1855 – 7 September 1941) was an Italian lawyer and amateur photographer. He is best known for taking the first photographs of the Shroud of Turin on 28 May 1898 and, when he was developing them, noticing that the photographic negatives showed a positive image of the man in the shroud in addition to a clearer rendition of the image. The image he obtained from the shroud has been approved by the Roman Catholic Church as part of the devotion to the Holy Face of Jesus.

Pia was born in Asti, Piedmont, and was an attorney who was also interested in art and science. In the early 1870s he began to explore the new technology of photography, and by the 1890s he was a city councilor and a member of Turin's Amateur Photographers' Club. He became a well known photographer in Turin, and examples of his other photographs are now part of the historical collection at the Turin Cinema Museum. Pia can be considered a pioneer in the field of photography for using electric lightbulbs in the 1890s, as lightbulbs were a novelty in the late nineteenth century, with Thomas Edison's reliable incandescent light bulb having been invented in 1879.

== The accidental photographer ==
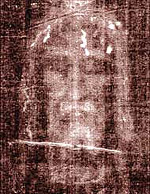
Secondo Pia's negative of the image on the Shroud of Turin, 1898

It was by accident that Secondo Pia unwittingly took the first step in the field of modern sindonology (the formal study of the shroud of Turin). In 1898 the city of Turin was celebrating the 400th anniversary of Turin Cathedral along with the 50th anniversary of Italy's Statuto Albertino constitution of 1848 in favor of the House of Savoy. As part of the celebration, a sacred art exhibition was planned. Since a public display of the shroud would have required permission from King Umberto I of Italy, who owned it, plans were made for two artists to paint realistic replicas of the shroud to be used instead. These paintings were made, but they were never used as part of the exhibition.

The head of the Shroud Commission, Baron Manno, petitioned the king for a public display and also asked for the right to photograph the shroud – with the help of Secondo Pia – to promote the exhibition. The king approved the public display of the shroud for the exhibition and later also allowed for it to be photographed. At that time the House of Savoy was based in Turin, and the shroud was already in Turin since it belonged to the king. No one knew yet that the clearer reverse image existed on the shroud, for the faint face image on the shroud cannot be clearly observed or recognized with the naked eye.

Secondo Pia was named the official photographer for the exhibition at a late date. The eight-day exhibition was just about to start, and it was too late for his proposed photograph to be part of the promotional campaign. Yet he took the opportunity to take the first photograph of the shroud.

== The famed photograph ==
On 25 May 1898, after the opening ceremony and during the noon closure of the exhibition, Pia set up equipment in Turin Cathedral. Two other people, Father Sanno Salaro and the head of cathedral security, Lieutenant Felice Fino, were also present and took part in the photography. It was one of the first times an electric light bulb was used to take a photograph.

The logistics of organizing the photographic session and the required equipment were a challenge to Pia, but he managed to set up two electric lamps of about 1000 candelas each. Since there was no electricity in the cathedral, Pia set up a portable generator. He managed to make a few exposures in the resulting heat before the session was interrupted by the opening of the cathedral doors after the noon closure. The results of this session were not successful once the plates were developed.

Three days later, on the evening of 28 May, Pia returned for a second session at about 9:30 pm and took a few more exposures. Based on his experience of 25 May, he varied the exposure times and the lighting. At around midnight the three men went back to develop the plates. Pia later said that he almost dropped and broke the photographic plate in the darkroom from the shock of what appeared on it: the reverse plate showed the positive image of a man and a face in a detail that could not be seen with the naked eye.

== Ongoing developments ==
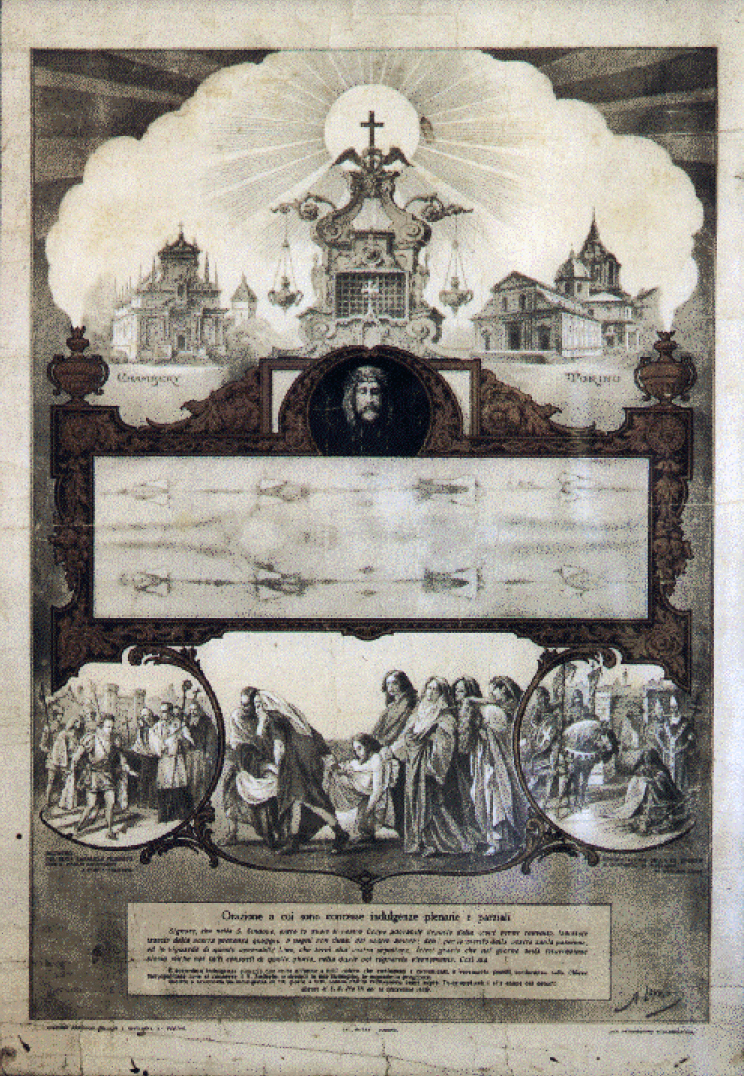
A poster advertising the 1898 exhibition of the shroud in Turin. Secondo Pia's photograph was taken too late to be included in the poster. The image on the poster includes a painted face, not obtained from Pia's photograph.

On 2 June 1898, the exhibition ended and the shroud was returned to its casket in the royal chapel. Genoa's Il Cittadino newspaper reported Pia's photograph on 13 June, and a day later the story appeared in the national newspaper Corriere Nazionale. On 15 June the Vatican newspaper Osservatore Romano covered the story.

The next few years witnessed a number of debates about Pia's photograph, with various suggestions of supernatural origin versus accusations of errors in his work, his doctoring of the photographs, etc. In the meantime, King Umberto I of Italy, whose permission was instrumental for the Pia photograph, was assassinated in July 1900 and did not see the full story unfold.

Some definite support for Secondo Pia eventually arrived in 1931 when a professional photographer, Giuseppe Enrie, also photographed the shroud and his findings supported Pia. When Enrie's photograph was first exhibited, Secondo Pia, then in his seventies, was among those present for viewing. Pia reportedly breathed a deep sigh of relief when he saw Enrie's photograph.

The scientific and religious discussions and debates about the origins of the image that Pia photographed continued. On the religious front, in 1939 Pia's negative image was used by Sister Maria Pierina De Micheli, a nun in Milan, to coin the Holy Face medal, as part of the Catholic devotion to the Holy Face of Jesus. Pope Pius XII approved the devotion and the medal and in 1958 declared the Feast of the Holy Face of Jesus as Shrove Tuesday (the Tuesday before Ash Wednesday) for all Roman Catholics. On the occasion of the 100th year of Secondo Pia's first photograph, on 24 May 1998, Pope John Paul II visited Turin Cathedral. In his address on that day, he said, "the Shroud is an image of God's love as well as of human sin", and he called the shroud "an icon of the suffering of the innocent in every age".

On the scientific front, in 2004 the optical journal of the Institute of Physics in London published a reviewed article on new imaging techniques applied to the shroud during its restoration in 2002. Scientific debate about the image and the shroud continues with international conferences.

== See also ==
- List of photographs considered the most important

== Sources and external links ==
- Exhibition in spring 2010 in the Cinema Museum, Torino
- Museum of the Shroud Website
- Sineklik
- Turin Cinema Museum
- Joan Carroll Cruz, OCDS. Saintly Men of Modern Times. (2003) ISBN 1-931709-77-7
- Summary of the notes of Don Coero Borga by Remi Van Haelst
- Bernard Ruffin, 1999, The Shroud of Turin ISBN 0-87973-617-8
- Secondo Pia, Fotografie (in Italian) ISBN 978-88-422-0214-1
- Sindonology.org
