= Oratory of the Holy Face =

Roman Catholic oratory in Tours, France

Coordinates: 47.393865°N 0.693072°E

The Oratory of the Holy Face is a Roman Catholic oratory in Tours France. It was originally established on the Rue St. Etienne, in the former home of Venerable Leo Dupont who did much to promote devotion to the Holy Face of Jesus. The Oratory was subsequently relocated to 8 Rue Bernard Palissy. The Dominican Fathers of the French Province have care of the Oratory. It is visited by many Catholic pilgrims every year.

== History ==
The original site on Rue St. Etienne was the former drawing room of Leo Dupont, a devout lawyer in Tours, who kept a vigil lamp burning continuously before an image of the Holy Face of Jesus. This particular image was based on a painting of the Veil of Veronica. Dupont was inspired in this devotion by revelations purportedly received by the Discalced Carmelite nun Sister Marie of St. Peter. Dupont became aware of these messages, as he handled a number of matters for the Carmel, where Sister Marie was portress.

Dupont would invite visitors to join him in prayer before the image of the Holy Face of Jesus. The oratory, and Dupont's prayers have been associated with a large number of reported cures. The Dublin Review of 1885 reported that Mgr. Paul Guerin testified to having himself seen over 6000 certificates of cures wrought by virtue of the miraculous oil from the lamp in the oratory.

When Dupont died in March 1876, his house on Rue St. Etienne was purchased by the Carmelites. Archbishop Charles-Théodore Colet of Tours turned Dupont's oratory into a chapel, which he dedicated on 29 June 1876. At the same time he canonically erected the Confraternity of the Holy Face. When the throngs of pilgrims became too much for a single chaplain to serve, he then established an order of priests called the "Priests of the Holy Face" to administer the chapel. Pierre Javier, a friend of Dupont, was appointed as its director. An active/contemplative diocesan congregation, their special object was to promote devotion to the Holy Face. They also sought to propagate use of the Saint Benedict Medal, one of Leo Dupont's particular devotions. In 1882, they began to publish the Annales e la Sainte Face. The religious institute is no longer active.

Louis and Zelie Martin, the parents of Thérèse of Lisieux, were enrolled in the confraternity in April 1885. Therese was introduced to the devotion by her sister Celine and was later called Saint Therese of the Child Jesus and the Holy Face. The poems and prayers she wrote helped to spread devotion to the Holy Face of Jesus.

In October 1885, Pope Leo XIII approved the Scapular of the Holy Face and elevated the confraternity to an archconfraternity. Pope Leo also expressed a desire to establish a similar oratory in Rome. This was eventually opened in the Via Pietro Cavallini in 1891 and administered by the Priests, but was demolished in subsequent redevelopment.

== Present day ==
The Dominican Fathers of the French Province now live in the home of Monsieur Dupont and are charged with the pastoral care of pilgrims to the Oratory of the Holy Face, now at 8 Rue Bernard Palissy, Tours.

== Sources ==
- Dorothy Scallan. "The Holy Man of Tours." (1990) ISBN 0-89555-390-2
- Joan Carroll Cruz, "Saintly Men of Modern Times." (2003) ISBN 1-931709-77-7 page 195
- Pierre Désiré Janvier, "The Life Of Leon Papin-Dupont: The Holy Man Of Tours", John Murphy & Co., 1882
