= Holy Face of Jesus =

Images believed to represent the face of Jesus

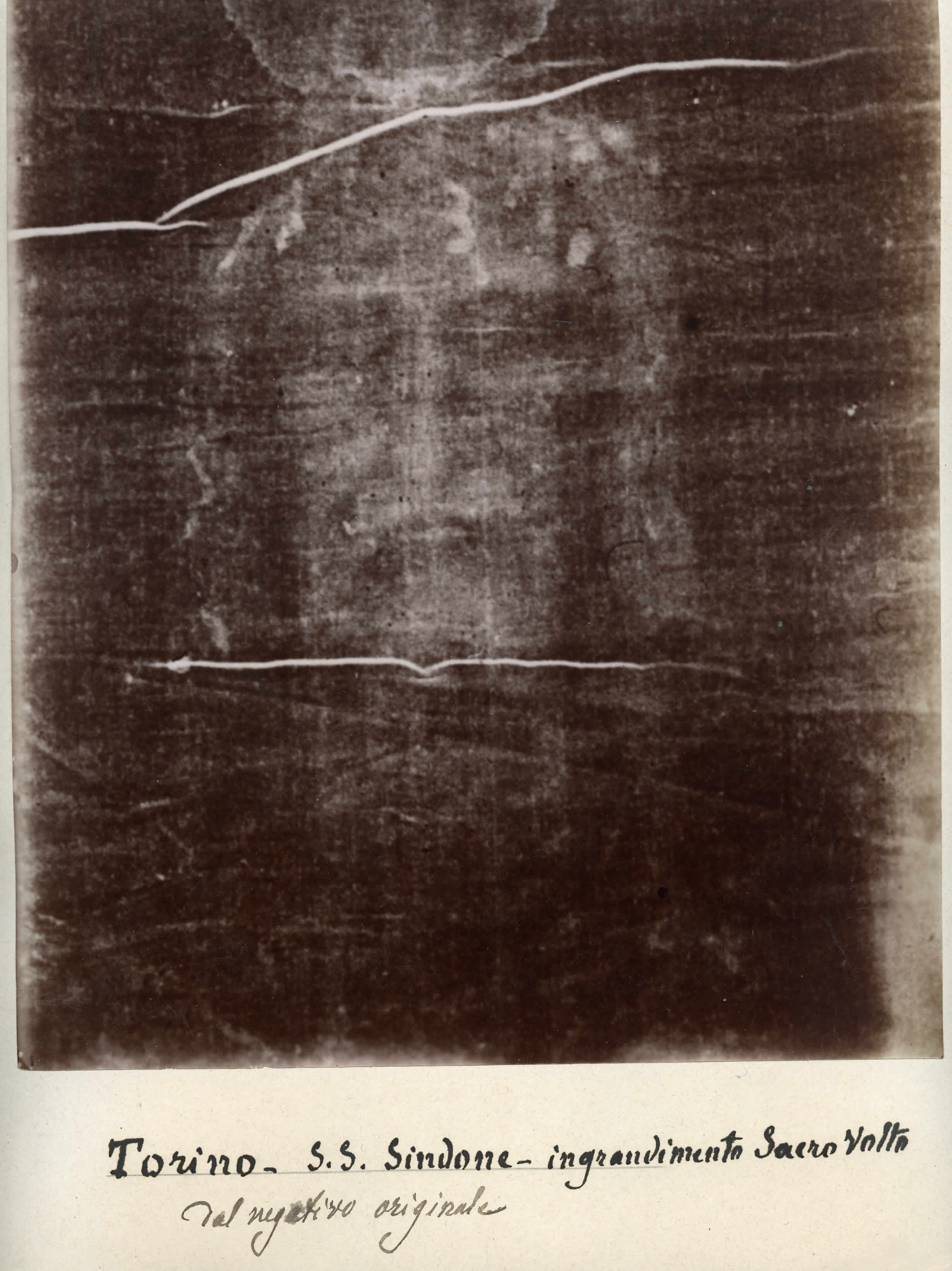
Secondo Pia's 1898 negative of the image on the Shroud of Turin. Image from Musée de l'Élysée, Lausanne.

The Holy Face of Jesus is a title for specific images which some Catholics believe to be miraculously formed representations of the face of Jesus Christ. The image obtained from the Shroud of Turin is associated with a specific medal worn by some Roman Catholics and is also one of the Catholic devotions to Christ.

Various acheiropoieta (literally "not-handmade") items relating to Christ have been reported throughout the centuries, and devotions to the face of Jesus have been practiced. Devotions to the Holy Face were approved by Pope Leo XIII in 1895 and Pope Pius XII in 1958.

In the Roman Catholic tradition, the Holy Face of Jesus is used in conjunction with Acts of Reparation to Jesus Christ with specific institutions whose focus is such reparations, e.g. the Pontifical Congregation of the Benedictine Sisters of the Reparation of the Holy Face. In his address to this Congregation, Pope John Paul II referred to such acts of reparation as the "unceasing effort to stand beside the endless crosses on which the Son of God continues to be crucified".

== The Veronica ==
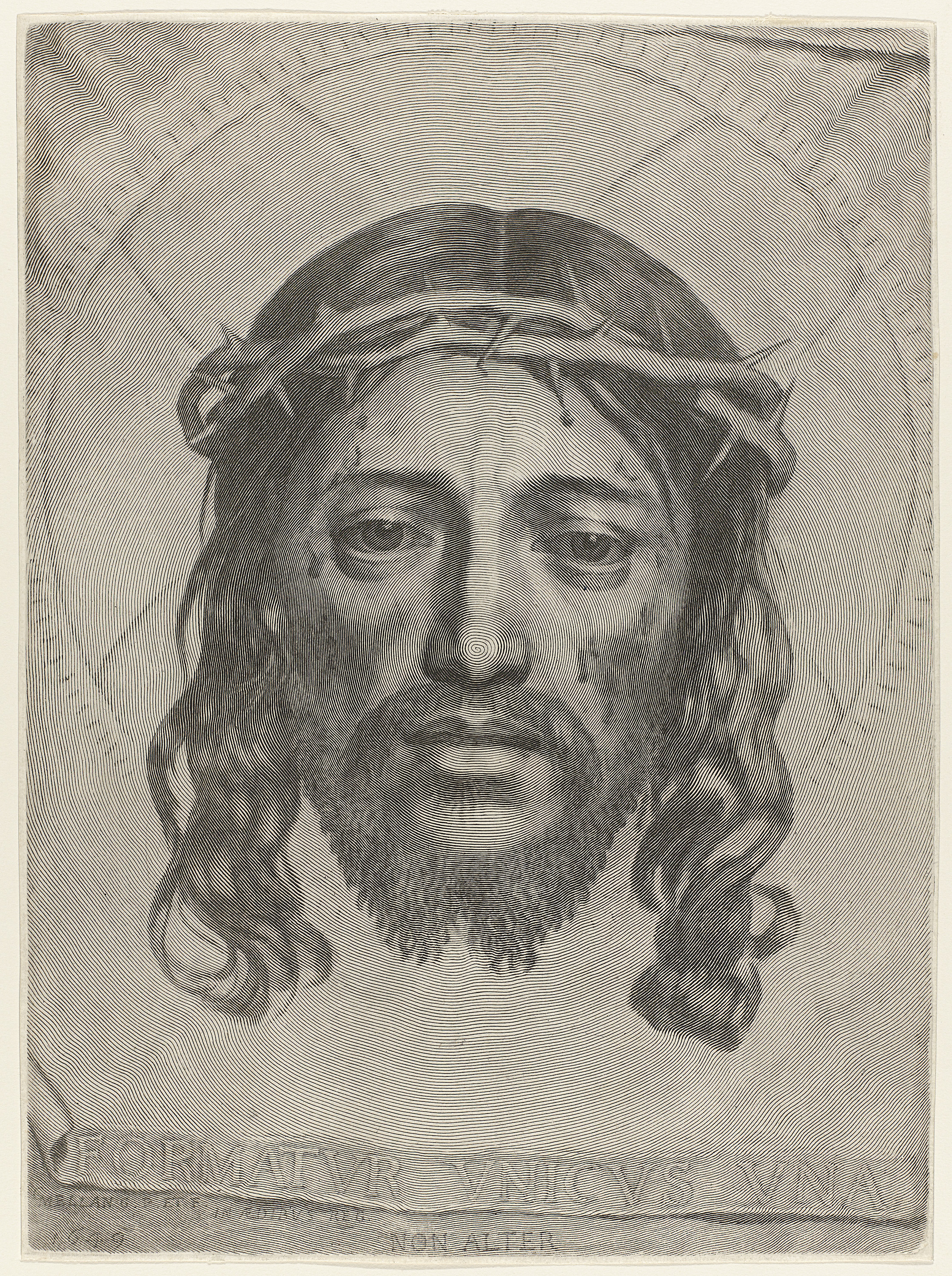
Veronica's veil by Claude Mellan (c. 1649)

Belief in the existence of authentic images of Christ is connected with the old legend of Abgar of Edessa regarding the "Mandylion". It is also seen in some apocryphal writings including the Mors Pilati that describe a "veil of Veronica" imprinted with Christ's face. The oldest and best known of these images was called the vera icon ('true image'), which in the popular imagination developed a story of a person "Veronica". The story is not recorded in its present form until the Middle Ages.

According to tradition Veronica encountered Jesus along the Via Dolorosa on the way to Calvary. When she paused to wipe the blood and sweat off his face with her veil, his image was imprinted on the cloth. The event is commemorated by the Sixth Station of the Cross.

=== Marie of St Peter ===
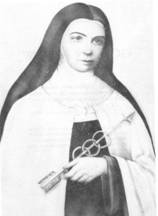
Sister Marie of St Peter

In 1844, Marie of St Peter, a Carmelite nun in Tours, France, reported an interior locution in which Jesus told her, "Those who will contemplate the wounds on My Face here on earth, shall contemplate it radiant in heaven." She later reported further "communications", as she termed them, with Jesus and the Virgin Mary in which she was urged to spread the devotion to the Holy Face of Jesus, in reparation for the many insults Jesus suffered in his Passion. Devotion to the Holy Face of Jesus started to spread among Roman Catholics in France.

=== Leo Dupont ===
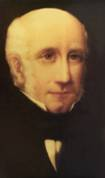
Leo Dupont, Apostle of the Holy Face

Leo Dupont was a religious man from a noble family who had moved to Tours. In 1849 he had started the nightly Eucharistic Adoration movement in Tours, from where it spread within France. He later came to be known as the "Holy Man of Tours". Upon hearing of Sister Marie of St Peter's reported visions, he started to burn a vigil lamp continuously before a picture of the Holy Face of Jesus, at that time an image based on the Veil of Veronica.

Dupont prayed for and promoted the case for a devotion to the Holy Face of Jesus for around 30 years. However, the documents pertaining to the life of sister Marie of St. Peter and the devotion were kept by the Church and not released; despite this, Dupont persisted in her cause. Eventually, in 1874 Charles-Théodore Colet was appointed as the new Archbishop of Tours. Archbishop Colet examined the documents and in 1876 gave permission for them to be published and the devotion encouraged, shortly before Dupont died. Dupont was thereafter at times referred to as the Apostle of the Holy Face.

When Leo Dupont died in 1876, his house on Rue St. Etienne in Tours was purchased by the Archdiocese of Tours and turned into the Oratory of the Holy Face. The oratory is administered by an order of priests called the Priests of the Holy Face, canonically erected in 1876. The Devotion to the Holy Face of Jesus was approved by Pope Leo XIII in 1885, who expressed a desire to establish a similar oratory in Rome. This was eventually opened in the Via Pietro Cavallini in 1891 and administered by the Priests, but was demolished in subsequent redevelopment.

=== Thérèse of Lisieux ===
Thérèse of Lisieux was a French nun who received the Carmelite habit in 1889 and later became known by the religious name "St. Thérèse of the Child Jesus and of the Holy Face". She was introduced to the Holy Face devotion through her blood sister Pauline, Sister Agnès of Jesus. Thérèse wrote many prayers to express the devotion to the Holy Face. She wrote the words "Make me resemble you, Jesus!" on a small card and attached a stamp of the Holy Face to it. She pinned the prayer in a small container over her heart since at that time the Holy Face Medal did not exist. In August 1895, in her "Canticle to the Holy Face" she wrote: "Jesus, Your ineffable image is the star which guides my steps. Ah, You know, Your sweet Face is for me Heaven on earth. My love discovers the charms of Your Face adorned with tears. I smile through my own tears when I contemplate Your sorrows."

Thérèse also composed the Holy Face prayer for sinners: "Eternal Father, since Thou hast given me for my inheritance the adorable Face of Thy Divine Son, I offer that face to Thee and I beg Thee, in exchange for this coin of infinite value, to forget the ingratitude of souls dedicated to Thee and to pardon all poor sinners."

== Shroud of Turin ==
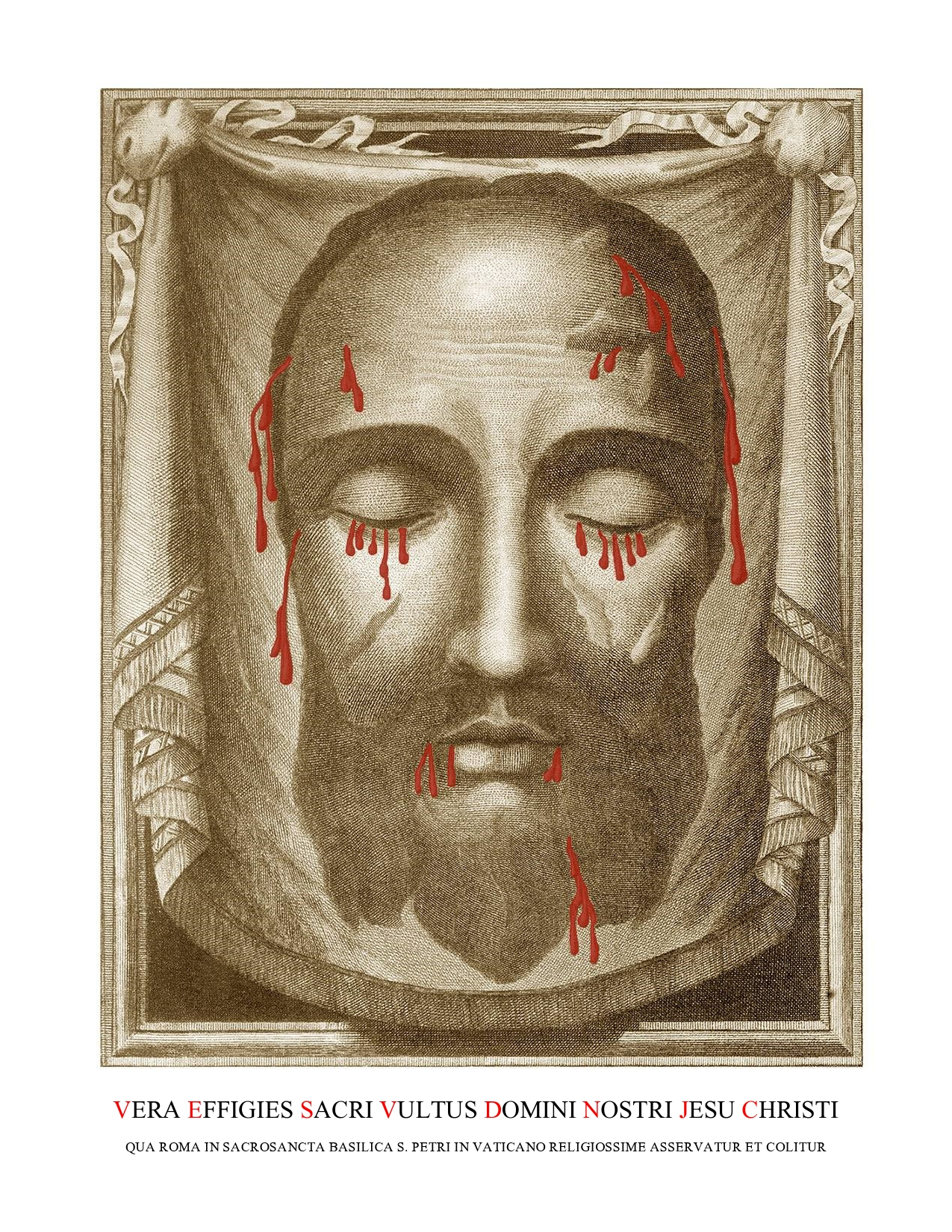
A reproduction or "engraving" of the Holy Face of Jesus associated with a miracle at St. Peter's Basilica on 6 January 1849.

A broader devotion to the Holy Face is based on the image used on the Shroud of Turin which some believe to be the burial cloth of Jesus. It is different from the likeness of Jesus on the Veil of Veronica, although the veil image had earlier been used in devotions. Since the Holy Face image is said to have been obtained from the burial cloth of Jesus, it is assumed to be a post-crucifixion image. However, the likeness on the Veil of Veronica is by definition pre-crucifixion, for it is assumed to have been imprinted when Veronica encountered Jesus in Jerusalem along the Via Dolorosa on the way to Calvary.

=== Maria Pierina De Micheli ===
On the first Friday in Lent 1936, Sister Maria Pierina De Micheli, who was born near Milan Italy, reported a vision in which Jesus told her: "I will that My Face, which reflects the intimate pains of My Spirit, the suffering and the love of My Heart, be more honored. He who meditates upon Me, consoles Me".

Further reported visions of Jesus and Mary urged Sister Maria Pierina to make a medal with the Holy Face of Jesus. This became known as the Holy Face Medal. On one side the medal bears a replica of the Holy Face image from Shroud of Turin and an inscription based on Psalm 66:2: "Illumina, Domine, vultum tuum super nos" ('May, O Lord, the light of Thy countenance shine upon us'). On the other side of the medal there is an image of a radiant Sacred Host, the monogram of the Holy Name ("IHS"), and the inscription "Mane nobiscum, Domine" ('Stay with us, O Lord').

In another vision, Sister Maria Pierina reported that Jesus told her: "Every time my Face is contemplated I will pour out my love into the heart of those persons, and by means of my Holy Face the salvation of many souls will be obtained". She further reported that Jesus wanted a special Feast on the day before Ash Wednesday in honor of His Holy Face, to be preceded by a Novena (9 days) of prayers.

After some effort Sister Maria Pierina managed to obtain permission to cast the medal and its use started to grow in Italy. As World War II started, many soldiers and sailors were given a Holy Face Medal as a means of protection. Sister Maria Pierina herself died in 1945 at the end of the war.

In 2000 Pope John Paul II stated that the inscription "Illumina, Domine, Vultum tuum super nos" on the Holy Face Medal underscores the need for deeper reflection on the Face of Jesus and the spread of devotion to it.

== Vatican approval and Feast Day ==
The first medal of the Holy Face was offered to Pope Pius XII who approved of the devotion and the medal. In 1958 he formally declared the Feast of the Holy Face of Jesus as Shrove Tuesday (the Tuesday before Ash Wednesday) for all Roman Catholics.

On the occasion of the 100th year of Secondo Pia's (28 May 1898) first photograph of the Shroud of Turin, on Sunday, 24 May 1998, Pope John Paul II visited the Turin Cathedral. In his address on that day, he said: "the Shroud is an image of God's love as well as of human sin" and "it is an icon of the suffering of the innocent in every age."

The Holy Face devotion and the Holy Face Medal spread among Roman Catholics worldwide, with organizations such as the Holy Face Association.

== Theological analysis ==
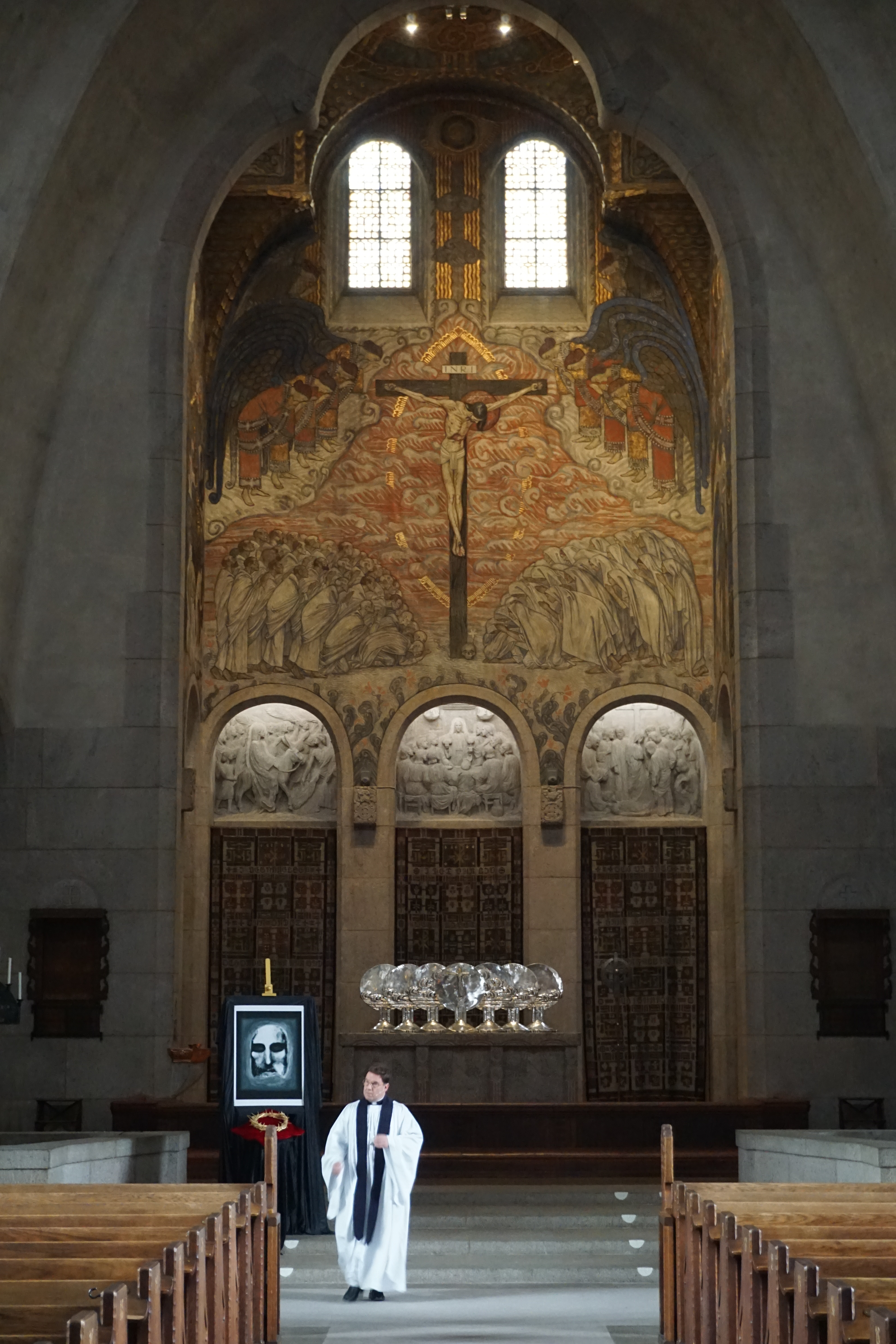
On Good Friday, the Holy Face of Jesus is displayed at Engelbrekt Evangelical-Lutheran Church. The Church of Sweden priest wears a black stole, the liturgical colour of Good Friday in Evangelical-Lutheranism; the church is dimly lit and the altar has been stripped for this holy day (2025).

In his 2005 book On the Way to Jesus Christ, Pope Benedict XVI performed an analysis of Holy Face devotions, and characterized them as having three separate components. The first element is discipleship, and the orientation of one's life towards an encounter with Jesus. The second element is seeing Jesus in the Eucharist. The third element is eschatological, and is interwoven between the other two.

Referring to Matthew 25:31–36 Benedict XVI stated that the first element (i.e. discipleship) involves seeing Jesus in the face of the poor and the oppressed, and caring for them, but to properly see Jesus in the face of those in need, believers first need to become better acquainted with Jesus through the Eucharist. The second element involves relating the Passion of Jesus, and the suffering expressed by the images that represent his wounded face to the Eucharistic experience. Thus the devotion that starts with the images of the face of Jesus leads to his contemplation in the Eucharistic experience. The eschatological element then builds on awakening to Christ by contemplating his face in the Eucharist.

== Institute for Holy Face research ==
The International Institute for Research on the Face of Christ was formed in 1997 by Cardinal Fiorenzo Angelini and the Benedictine Sisters of the Reparation of the Holy Face in Rome.

In his message to the 6th annual conference of the Institute held in Rome in October 2002, Pope John Paul II emphasized the spiritual importance of contemplation of the Face of Christ and referred to his Apostolic Letter Novo Millennio Ineunte, which stated:

And is it not the Church's task to reflect the light of Christ in every historical period, to make his face shine also before the generations of the new millennium? Our witness, however, would be hopelessly inadequate if we ourselves had not first contemplated his face.

In the same message John Paul II also related the theme of the contemplation to that of contemplating the Person of Christ as discussed in his first encyclical Redemptor hominis.

== See also ==
- Roman Catholic devotions to Jesus Christ
- Holy Wounds
- Oratory of the Holy Face
- Sisters of the Reparation of the Holy Face
- Scapular of the Holy Face
- Veronican Sisters of the Holy Face
- Devotions To The Holy Face

== Sources ==
- Joan Carroll Cruz, Saintly Men of Modern Times. (2003) ISBN 1-931709-77-7
- Dorothy Scallan. The Holy Man of Tours. (1990) ISBN 0-89555-390-2
- Dorothy Scallan, et al. 1994 The Life & Revelations of Sr. Mary of St. Peter ISBN 0-89555-389-9
- Bernard Ruffin, 1999, The Shroud of Turin ISBN 0-87973-617-8
- Céline Martin. My Sister Therese of the Holy Face. (1997) ISBN 0-89555-598-0
- Veronica; or, The Holy Face of Our Lord Jesus Christ. Historical Notice of This Signal and Most Holy Major Relic of the Basilica of the Vatican. Prayers and Indulgences. Philadelphia 1872
