= Archdiocese of Tours =

Catholic archdiocese in France

Coordinates: 47.40°N 0.69°E

Archdiocese of Tours Archidioecesis Turonensis Archidiocèse de Tours

Catholic
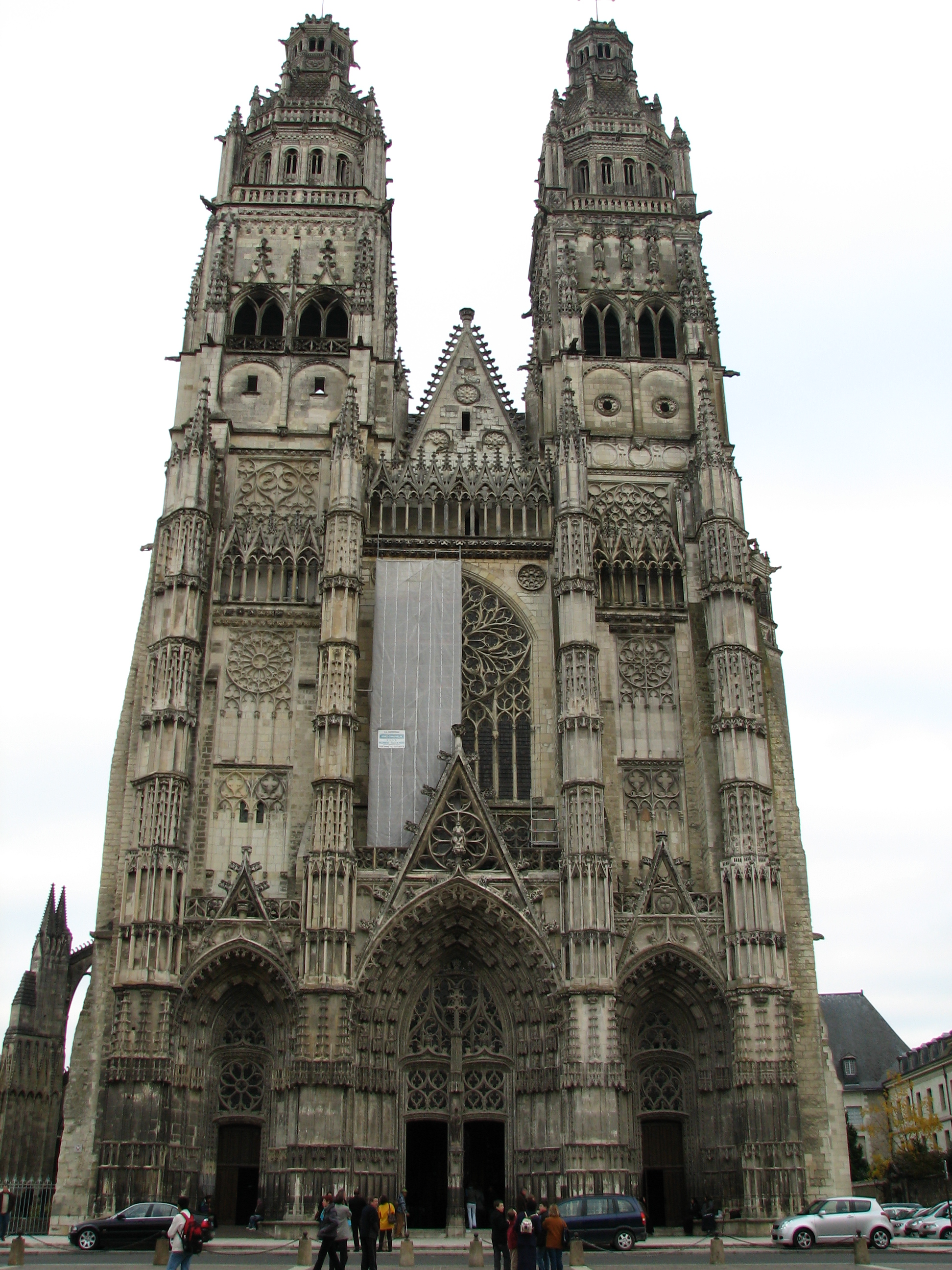
- Tours Cathedral

Location
- Country: France
- Ecclesiastical province: Tours

Statistics
- Area: 6,158 km^{2} (2,378 sq mi)
- Population: Total; Catholics: (as of 2022); 608,390 (est.); 502,000 (est.) (82.5%)
- Parishes: 39

Information
- Denomination: Catholic
- Sui iuris church: Latin Church
- Rite: Roman Rite
- Established: 3rd Century (As Diocese of Tours); 5th Century (As Archdiocese of Tours)
- Cathedral: Cathedral of St. Gatianus in Tours
- Patron saint: St. Gatianus of Tours; St. Martin of Tours
- Secular priests: 72 (Diocesan); 23 (Religious Orders); 30 Permanent Deacons

Current leadership
- Pope: Leo XIV
- Archbishop: Vincent Jordy
- Suffragans: Archdiocese of Bourges; Diocese of Blois; Diocese of Chartres; Diocese of Orléans
- Bishops emeritus: Bernard-Nicolas Aubertin

Map

Website
- diocesedetours.catholique.fr

Ecclesiastical province of Tours

The Archdiocese of Tours (Latin: Archidioecesis Turonensis; French: Archidiocèse de Tours) is a Latin Church archdiocese of the Catholic Church in France. The archdiocese has roots that go back to the 3rd century, while the formal erection of the diocese dates from the 5th century.

The ecclesiastical province of Tours corresponds with the late Roman province of Tertia Lugdunensis. During Breton independence the see of Dol briefly exercised metropolitical functions (mainly tenth century). In 1859 the Breton dioceses except that of Nantes were constituted into a province of Rennes. Tours kept its historic suffragans of Le Mans, Angers together with Nantes and a newly constituted Diocese of Laval. In 2002 Tours lost all connection with its historic province, all its previous suffragans depending henceforth on an expanded province of Rennes (corresponding to the Brittany and Pays de la Loire administrative regions). Tours since 2002 has become the ecclesiastical metropolis of the Centre administrative region.

In 2022, the Archdiocese of Tours had one priest for every 5,284 Catholics.

== History ==
=== Ancient ===
According to Louis Duchesne, the See of Tours was probably founded in the time of Constantine; however, Gregory of Tours says it was founded in the reign of Emperor Decius by Gatianus. As the city, (called "Caesarodunum"), was important as a crossing point of the Loire, it became a stop on the route to Santiago de Compostela. The fourth bishop was Brice of Tours. Stories about his tenure suggest tensions between the regular clergy and the secular priests in Tours at that time. Saint Perpetuus was bishop from 460 to 490. During his administration Christianity was further developed and consolidated in the province of Touraine. He was followed by Volusianus of Tours, a relative of Ruricius of Limoges. The first cathedral, dedicated to Saint Maurice, was built by Bishop Lidoire, sometime in the fourth century; it burned down in 561, but was restored by Gregory of Tours.

Bishop Chrotbert (Robert) is mentioned in the earliest grant of privileges to the Monastery of St. Martin in Tours, made by Pope Adeodatus (672–676). The document survives only in two copies which differ significantly between them; both are suspect.

=== Medieval ===
In May 858, which was the third year of his pontificate, Archbishop Herardus held a diocesan synod, in which a codification was issued of the capitula ('regulations') of the diocese. The document contained 140 chapters.

On 21 January 1216, Pope Innocent III confirmed an agreement entered into between the Archbishop of Tours and the Chapter of the cathedral on the election of a Dean and Provosts.

After the death of Archbishop Jean de la Faye in April 1228, there appears to have been considerable difficulty in finding a new archbishop. Jean Maan, Dean of Mans, was brought to Tours, but he refused the see, or was unable to muster sufficient votes. Then the see was offered to Master Pierre de Collomedio of Champagne, a Canon of Thérouanne and Papal Legate, but, though the election was canonically carried out, he refused the offer.

=== Revolution ===
The leaders of the French Revolution, as part of their program, planned to bring the religions in France under their control. The Roman Church was rich, and therefore powerful. The Revolution needed to redirect that power and acquire that wealth to finance their own projects. One device was to transfer old loyalties by breaking up the traditional units of political, social and religious organization. The property of the religious organizations was to be confiscated for the benefit of the people of France, and all clergy would become state employees, with their salaries fixed and paid by the government. The new political unit was to be the "département", of which eighty-four were planned. It was determined by the Constituent Assembly that the Church was overloaded with bishops; therefore the number of dioceses needed to be reduced, from the 135 of the Ancien Régime, to 82 or 83, and that to the extent possible they were to have the same borders as the new political departments. The Diocese of Tours was therefore abolished and subsumed into a new diocese, coterminous with the new 'Departement d'Indre-et-Loire', which was to be a suffragan of the 'Metropole du Centre' (composed of the dioceses of Allier, Cher, Creuse, Indre, Indre-et-Loire, Loire-et-Cher, Nièvre and Vienne, with its center at Bourges) in the "Constitutional Church". The clergy were required to swear and oath to the Constitution, and under the terms of the Civil Constitution of the Clergy a new bishop was to be elected by all the voters of the département, who did not even need to be Catholics. This placed them in schism with the Roman Catholic Church and the Pope. Archbishop de Conzié of Tours refused to take the oath, and his bishopric was therefore declared to be vacant.

On 13 March 1791 the electors of Indre-et-Loire met in Tours in the cathedral. They were harangued by members of the Société des Amis de la Constitution, who pressed for the election of their president, a former Oratorian by the name of Ysabeau, who, however, could not muster a majority. Instead on the next day the electors chose Pierre Suzor, the curate of Ecueillé. He proceeded to Paris, where he was consecrated a bishop on 10 April by Constitutional Bishops Massieu, Delcher, and Sibille. His consecration was valid, but uncanonical and schismatic, and brought him excommunication. As bishop, he was at first conservative and somewhat rigorous, refusing to sanction the marriage of clergy, but later he succumbed to pressure. At the end of 1793, when Religion was abolished and replaced by Reason and the churches closed, most of the 360 clergy of Indre-et-Loire abdicated or apostasized. Religion was restored in 1795, but Suzor did not regain possession of the cathedral until 13 May 1797. Suzor suffered a stroke in 1797; the bishops of the Metropolitanate were allowed to assemble at Bourges in 1800 to find him a successor. On 1 February 1801 Hyacinthe Tardiveau accepted the position, and Suzor died on 13 April 1801, having approved of his successor. Tardiveau was never bishop, since he made his acceptance conditional upon receiving the traditional bulls from the pope, which never happened. In May 1801 First Consul Napoleon Bonaparte required the resignation of all Constitutional bishops; he was in the process of completing a concordat with the Papacy, and the Constitutional Church was an obstacle.

After the Concordat went into effect, Pius VII was able to issue the appropriate bulls to restore many of the dioceses and to regulate their boundaries, most of which corresponded closely to the new 'départements'. The Diocese of Tours, which was coterminous with the Department of Indre-et-Loire, had as suffragans: Le Mans, Angers, Rennes, Nantes, Quimper, Vannes, Saint-Pol, Treguier, Saint-Brieux Saint-Mâlo and Dol.

==== Pilgrimages ====
The main pilgrimage sites in the diocese besides the grottos of Marmoutier, are: Notre-Dame-la-Riche, a sanctuary erected on the site of a church dating from the third century, and where the founder St. Gatianus is venerated; Notre-Dame-de-Loches; St. Christopher and St. Giles at St-Christophe, a pilgrimage dating from the ninth century; the pilgrimage to the Oratory of the Holy Face in Tours, managed by Priests of the Holy Face canonically erected on 8 December 1876.

== Bishops ==
=== to 700 ===
- St. Gatianus (c. 249–301)
- St. Litorius 338–370
- St. Martin 371–397
- St. Bricius 397–443
- St. Eustochius 443–460
- St. Perpetuus 460–490
- St. Volusianus 491–498
- Verus (498–508)
- Licinius (508–520)
- Theodorus & Proculus (jointly) (520–521?)
- Dinfius (521?)
- Ommatius (521–525)
- Leo (526?)
- Francilio (528? or 526–528?)
- Injuriosus (529–546)
- Baudinus (546–552)
- Gunthar 552–554
- St. Eufronius 555–573
- St. Gregory (573–594)
- Pelagius I (595–602)
- Leupacharius (602–614)
- Agiricus (614–617)
- Gwalachus (617–618)

[Valatus 618–619]

- Sigilaicus 619–622
- Leobaldus 622–625
- Medegisilus (625–638)
- Latinus (638–650)
- Charegiselus (Carégisile) 650–652
- Rigobertus 652–654
- Papolenus 654–660
- Chrotbert 660–695
- Pelagius II 695–700

=== 700 to 1000 ===
- Evartius 700–709
- Ibbon 709–724
- Gontran II 724–732
- Didon 732–733
- Rimbert 733–752
- Aubert 752–754
- Ostald 754–760
- Gravien 760–765
- Eusebe 765–771
- Herling 771–792
- Joseph I 792–815
- Landran I 815–836
- Ursmarus 836–846
- Landran II 846–852
- Amalricus (852–856)
- Herardus 856–871
- Actardus (872–875)
- Adalardus 875–890
- Herbernus 890–916
- Robert II of Tours 916–932
- Theotolo 932–945
- Joseph II 946–957
- Frotaire 957–960
- Hardouin 960–980
- Archambault de Sully 981–1008

=== 1000–1300 ===
- Hugues de Chateaudun 1008–1023
- Arnoul 1023–1052
- Barthelemy de Faye 1053–1068
- Raoul I 1072–1085
- Raoul II 1086–1117
- Gilbert de Maillé 1118–1125
- Hildebert de Lavardin 1125–1134
- Hugues d'Etampes 1134–1146
- Engebaldus 1146–1157
- Joscius 1157–1174
- Barthelemy de Vendôme 1174–1206
- Géoffroy de la Lande (1206 – 29 April 1208)
- Jean de la Faye (4 October 1208 – 23 April 1228)

[François Cassard 1228–1229]

- Juhel de Mathefelon (1229 – 20 March 1244)
- Géoffroy Marcel (13 May 1245 – 10 July 1251)
- Pierre de Lamballe (8 April 1252 – 24 October 1256)

[Philippe 1256–1257]

- Vincent de Pirmil (1257 – 19 September 1270)
- Jean de Montsoreau (16 January 1271 – 26 January 1284)
- Olivier de Craon (24 May 1284 – 24 August 1285)
- Bouchard Dain (24 April 1286 – 19 October 1290)
- Philippe de Candé (3 January 1291 – 15 February 1291)
- Renaud de Montbazon (21 November 1291 – 23 August 1312)

=== 1300–1500 ===
- Geoffroy de la Haye (20 February 1313 – 6 April 1323)
- Étienne de Bourgueil (16 August 1323 – 7 March 1335)
- Pierre Frétaud (14 July 1335 – 21 May 1357)
- Philippe Blanche (3 July 1357 – 1363)
- Simon de Renoul (25 October 1363 – 2 January 1379)
- Seguin d'Anton (14 January 1380 – 20 June 1380) (Avignon Obedience)
- Aléaume Boistel (20 June 1380 – 1382) (Avignon Obedience)
- Guy de Roye (17 October 1382 – 8 October 1383) (Avignon Obedience)
- Seguin d'Anton (8 October 1383 – 25 March 1395) ('Perpetual Administrator', Avignon Obedience)
- Ameil du Breuil (5 November 1395 – 1 September 1414) (Avignon Obedience)
- Jacques Gélu (7 November 1414 – 30 July 1427)
- Philippe de Coëtquis (30 July 1427 – 12 July 1441)
- Jean Bernard (11 December 1441 – 28 April 1466)
- Gerard Bastet de Crussol (9 June 1466 – 13 May 1468)
- Hélie de Bourdeilles, O.Min. (16 May 1468 – 5 July 1484)
- Robert de Lenoncourt (29 July 1484 – 28 March 1509)

=== 1500–1700 ===
- Carlo Domenico del Carretto (5 April 1509 – 1514)
- Christophe de Brillac (3 July 1514 – 31 July 1520)
- Martin Fournier de Beaune (24 August 1520 – 1527)
- Antoine de la Barre 1528–1547
- Georges d'Armagnac (13 January 1548 – 1551)
- Etienne Poncher (6 April 1551 – 15 March 1553)
- Alessandro Farnese (28 April 1553 – 25 June 1554 (Administrator)
- Simon de Maillé de Brézé (25 June 1554 – 11 January 1597)
- François de la Guesle (7 February 1597 – 30 October 1614)
- Sebastien d'Ori Galagai (19 December 1616 – 1617)
- Bertrand d'Eschaud (26 June 1617 – 21 May 1641)
- Victor Le Bouthillier (21 May 1641 – 12 November 1670)
- Charles de Rosmadec (1671–1672)
- Michel Amelot de Gournay 1673–1687

Claude de Saint George (1687–1693) (Vicar General and Administrator)

- Mathieu Isoré d'Hervault (22 December 1693 – 9 July 1716)

=== 1700–1900 ===
- Armand Pierre de la Croix de Castries (18 September 1719 – 23 September 1722)
- François Blouet de Camilly (20 January 1723 – 17 October 1723)
- Louis Jacques de Chapt de Rastignac (27 September 1724 – 2 August 1750)
- Bernardin de Rosset de Fleury (17 May 1751 – 2 March 1775)
- Joachim François Mamert de Conzié (29 May 1775 – 1795)
- Jean de Dieu Raymond de Boisgelin (16 April 1802 – 24 August 1804)
- Louis Mathias de Barral (1 February 1805 – 26 September 1815)
- Jean-Baptiste du Chilleau (1 October 1818 – 24 November 1824)
- Augustin Louis de Montblanc (24 November 1824 – 28 December 1841)
- Cardinal François Nicolas Madeleine Morlot (27 January 1843 – 1857)
- Joseph Hippolyte Guibert (19 March 1857 – 27 October 1871)
- Felix Pierre Fruchaud (27 October 1871 – 9 November 1874)
- Charles-Théodore Colet (21 December 1874 – 27 November 1883)
- Cardinal Guillaume René Meignan (25 March 1884 – 20 January 1896)
- René François Renou (25 June 1896 – 1913)

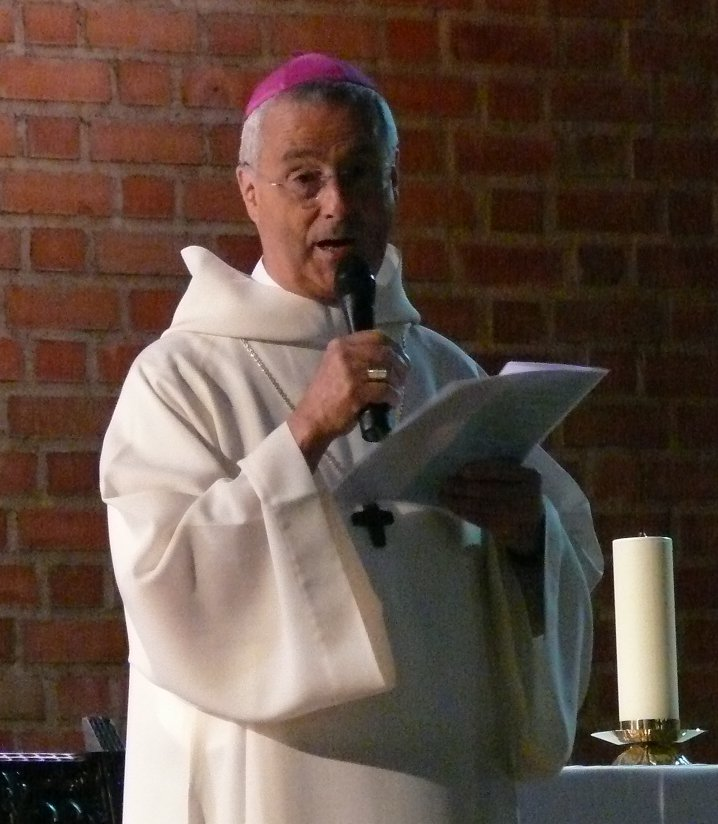
Archbishop Bernard-Nicolas Jean-Marie Aubertin

=== From 1900 ===
- Albert Negre 1913–1931
- Ludovico Gaillard 1931–1956
- Louis Ferrand 1956–1980
- Jean Marcel Honoré 1981–1997; elevated to Cardinal in 2001
- Michel Moutel 1997–1998
- André Vingt-Trois 1999–2005; appointed Archbishop of Paris (Cardinal in 2007)
- Bernard-Nicolas Aubertin, O.Cist. (2005 - 26 October 2019)
- Vincent Jordy (4 November 2019 – present)

== Bibliography ==
=== Reference works ===
- Gams, Pius Bonifatius (1873). Series episcoporum Ecclesiae catholicae: quotquot innotuerunt a beato Petro apostolo. Ratisbon: Typis et Sumptibus Georgii Josephi Manz. (Use with caution; obsolete)
- Eubel, Conradus, ed. (1913). Hierarchia catholica, Tomus 1 (second ed.). Münster: Libreria Regensbergiana. (in Latin)
- Eubel, Conradus, ed. (1914). Hierarchia catholica, Tomus 2 (second ed.). Münster: Libreria Regensbergiana. (in Latin)
- Eubel, Conradus; Gulik, Guilelmus, eds. (1923). Hierarchia catholica, Tomus 3 (second ed.). Münster: Libreria Regensbergiana.
- Gauchat, Patritius (Patrice) (1935). Hierarchia catholica IV (1592–1667). Münster: Libraria Regensbergiana.
- Ritzler, Remigius; Sefrin, Pirminus (1952). Hierarchia catholica medii et recentis aevi V (1667–1730). Patavii: Messagero di S. Antonio.
- Ritzler, Remigius; Sefrin, Pirminus (1958). Hierarchia catholica medii et recentis aevi. Vol. VI (1730–1799). Patavii: Messagero di S. Antonio.
- Ritzler, Remigius; Sefrin, Pirminus (1968). Hierarchia Catholica medii et recentioris aevi (in Latin). Vol. VII (1800–1846). Monasterii: Libr. Regensburgiana.
- Remigius Ritzler; Pirminus Sefrin (1978). Hierarchia catholica Medii et recentioris aevi (in Latin). Vol. VIII (1846–1903). Il Messaggero di S. Antonio.
- Pięta, Zenon (2002). Hierarchia catholica medii et recentioris aevi (in Latin). Vol. IX (1903–1922). Padua: Messagero di San Antonio. ISBN 978-88-250-1000-8.

=== Studies ===
- V. Arnault (1893). Le clergé de Touraine pendant la Révolution française, 1789-1800 (in French). Tours: Alfred Cattier.
- Chevalier, C. (1871). Origines de l'Église de Tours in: Mémoires de la Société Archéologique de Touraine (in French). Tours: Guilland-Verger. 1871. pp. 1–634.
- Crété-Protin, Isabelle (2002). Église et vie chrétienne dans le diocèse de Troyes du IVe au IXe siècle (in French). Villeneuve-d'Ascq (Nord): Presses Univ. Septentrion. ISBN 978-2-85939-753-1.
- Duchesne, Louis (1890). Les anciens catalogues épiscopaux de la province de Tours (in French). Paris: E. Thorin.
- Duchesne, Louis (1910). Fastes épiscopaux de l'ancienne Gaule: II. L'Aquitaine et les Lyonaises. Paris: Fontemoing. second edition (in French)
- Hauréau, Barthélemy (1856). Gallia Christiana: In Provincias Ecclesiasticas Distributa... De provincia Turonensi (in Latin). Vol. Tomus Quartus decimus (XIV). Paris: Typographia Regia. pp. 1084–1118, Instrumenta, pp. 261–270.
- Jean, Armand (1891). Les évêques et les archevêques de France depuis 1682 jusqu'à 1801 (in French). Paris: A. Picard.
- Jehan (de Saint-Clavien), L.-F. (1871). Saint Gatien, premier évêque de Tours, in: Mémoires de la Société Archéologique de Touraine (in French). Tours: Guilland-Verger. 1871. pp. 641–756.
- Tableau des évêques constitutionnels de France, de 1791 a 1801 (in French). Paris: chez Méquignon-Havard. 1827. p. 32.
- Société bibliographique (France) (1907). L'épiscopat français depuis le Concordat jusqu'à la Séparation (1802–1905). Paris: Librairie des Saints-Pères.
