= Mary of Saint Peter =

French Roman Catholic nun (1816–1848)

Mary of Saint Peter (French: Marie de Saint-Pierre; 4 October 1816 – 8 July 1848) was a Discalced Carmelite nun who lived in Tours, France. She is best known for starting the devotion to the Holy Face of Jesus which is now one of the approved Catholic devotions and for The Golden Arrow prayer. She also introduced the "Little Sachet" sacramental.

== Life ==
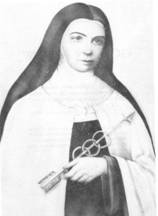
Sister Marie of St Peter with the Golden Arrow. The three rings symbolize the Holy Trinity.

Marie was born Perrine Éluère on 4 October 1816 in Rennes, region of Brittany, to Peter and Frances Portier Éluère, and baptized in the Church of St. Germain. Her mother died when she was twelve and she was sent to learn dressmaking with two of her paternal aunts. On 13 November 1839 she entered the Carmelite Monastery of Tours, France, which had a particular devotion to the Sacred Heart. Perrine had a special devotion to the Holy Infancy of Jesus. She was professed as a Discalced Carmelite nun under the name Mary of Saint Peter and of the Holy Family (French: Sœur Marie de Saint-Pierre et de la Sainte Famille) on 8 June 1841.

On 8 August 1843 Pope Gregory XVI promulgated a papal brief for the erection of a confraternity under the patronage of Louis IX of France for the reparation of blasphemy against the Holy Name of God. Louis IX, commonly revered as Saint Louis, was King of France from 1226 until his death in 1270.

On 26 August Leo Dupont, the "holy man of Tours", distributed among several of the communities of Tours a prayer in honor of the Holy Name of God. The prayers had been circulated among all the religious houses of the city, but despite being on friendly terms with the Carmelites, Leo Dupont apparently forgot them.

Mary reported that eighteen days later, while commencing her evening prayer Jesus made her to understand that he would give her a prayer of reparation, a "golden dagger" for blasphemy against his Holy Name. He told her that the devotion He was entrusting to her was to have as its aim not only reparation for blasphemy, but also reparation for the profanation of the Holy Day of the Lord. She invariably declared that these "communications" were neither visions, nor apparitions; that the truths shown her were not exhibited under an eternal form, nor did she physically hear what she was commissioned to relate.

From 1844 to 1847 Mary of Saint Peter reported that she had "communications" from Jesus about spreading devotion to his Holy Face. She reported that she experienced what her biographer, Janvier, terms "an interior vision". Repeatedly she describes that while at meditation "The Lord gave me to understand" particular insights. According to Marie of Saint Peter, Jesus told her that he desired devotion to his Holy Face in reparation for sacrilege and blasphemy, which he described as being like a "poisoned arrow." She wrote "The Golden Arrow Holy Face Devotion," which she said was dictated to her by Jesus. This prayer is now a well known Act of Reparation to Jesus Christ.

The devotion that she started was promoted by Leo Dupont. Dupont prayed for and promoted the case for a devotion to the Holy Face of Jesus for around 30 years. Documents pertaining to the life of Mary of Saint Peter and the devotion were kept by the Catholic Church. Eventually, in 1874 Charles-Théodore Colet was appointed as the new Archbishop of Tours. Archbishop Colet examined the documents and in 1876 gave permission for them to be published and the devotion encouraged. The Devotion to the Holy Face of Jesus was eventually approved by Pope Leo XIII in 1885.

Almost 50 years later, another French Discalced Carmelite nun, Thérèse of Lisieux wrote a number of poems and prayers in the 1890s that also helped spread the devotion to the Holy Face. In the 1930s, an Italian nun, Maria Pierina De Micheli associated the image of the Holy Face of Jesus from the Shroud of Turin with the devotion and made the first Holy Face Medal.

The first Holy Face Medal was offered to Pope Pius XII who accepted it and approved the devotion in 1958 and declared the Feast of the Holy Face of Jesus as Shrove Tuesday (the Tuesday before Ash Wednesday) for all Roman Catholics.

== The Golden Arrow prayer ==
"The Golden Arrow prayer" is based on reports of interior conversations of Jesus by Mary of Saint Peter, of the Carmel of Tours, in 1843. It is a prayer of reparation in praise of the Holy Name of God. It is also a reparation for the profanation of Sunday and the Holy Days of Obligation.

On March 16, 1844, Jesus reportedly told Mary: "Oh if you only knew what great merit you acquire by saying even once, 'Admirable is the Name of God', in a spirit of reparation for blasphemy."

Mary stated that Jesus told her that the two sins which offend him the most grievously are blasphemy and the profanation of Sunday. He called this prayer the "Golden Arrow", saying that those who would recite it would pierce him delightfully, and also heal those other wounds inflicted on him by the malice of sinners. Mary of Saint Peter saw, "streaming from the Sacred Heart of Jesus, delightfully wounded by this 'Golden Arrow,' torrents of graces for the conversion of sinners".

In her book she wrote that in her visions Jesus told her that an act of sacrilege or blasphemy is like a "poisoned arrow", hence the name "Golden Arrow" for this reparatory prayer.

Words of the prayer:

May the most holy, most sacred, most adorable,
most incomprehensible and ineffable Name of God
be forever praised, blessed, loved, adored
and glorified in Heaven, on earth,
and under the earth,
by all the creatures of God,
and by the Sacred Heart of Our Lord Jesus Christ,
in the Most Holy Sacrament of the Altar.
Amen.

Another version:

May the most holy, most sacred, most adorable,
most incomprehensible and unutterable Name of God
be praised, blessed, loved, adored
and glorified in heaven, on earth,
and in the hells,
by all the creatures of God,
and by the Sacred Heart of Our Lord Jesus Christ
in the Most Holy Sacrament of the Altar.
AMEN.

== The Little Gospel ==
The "Little Gospel", "Little Sachet" or the Gospel of the Holy Name of Jesus, is a Roman Catholic devotion that, according to tradition, was mystically revealed by Jesus Christ to Mary of Saint Peter in 1847, in a monastery in Tours, France.

It consists of a tiny leaflet on which are printed the short Gospel of the Circumcision, consisting of Luke 2:21 which mentions the giving of the name "Jesus"; a picture of Christ; the initials IHS representing the Holy Name of Jesus; and some invocation together with the lines, "When Jesus was named — Satan was disarmed." This leaflet is folded into a small square, enclosed in a small pouch, and distributed to the faithful, who are encouraged to frequently say "Blessed be the Most Holy Name of Jesus without end" while wearing it.

== See also ==
- Acts of Reparation to Jesus Christ
- Holy Face of Jesus
- Holy Name of Jesus
- Maria Pia Mastena
- Marie Martha Chambon
- Oratory of the Holy Face
- Sisters of the Reparation of the Holy Face

== Sources ==
- Ball, Ann (2003). Encyclopedia of Catholic Devotions and Practices. Huntington, Ind: Our Sunday Visitor (IN). pp. 209–210. ISBN 0-87973-910-X.
- The Golden Arrow: The Autobiography and Revelations of Sister Mary of St. Peter by Mary of St. Peter and Dorothy Scallan (May 1, 2009) ISBN 0895553899
- Dorothy Scallan. The Holy Man of Tours. (1990) ISBN 0-89555-390-2
- The Golden Arrow: The Autobiography and Revelations of Sister Mary of St. Peter (1816-1848 on Devotion to the Holy Face of Jesus by Dorothy Scallan (May 1, 2009) ISBN 0895553899
- Janvier, Rev. P. (1884). The Life of Sister Mary St. Peter (PDF). Imprimatur of the Archbishop of Tours.
