= Charles Théodore Colet =

- Archbishop of Tours
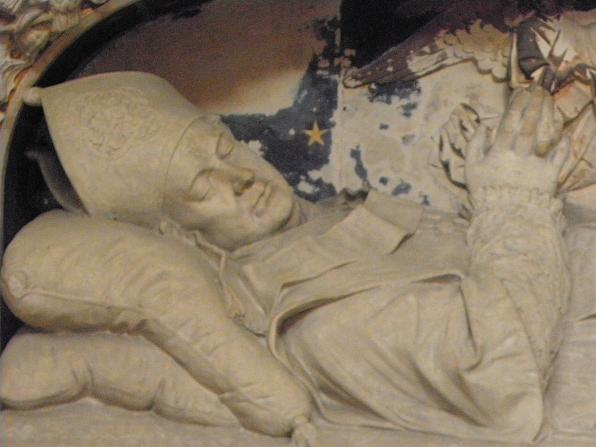
- Commemorative monument of Mgr Colet, Cathedral of Saint Gatianus of Tours
- Church: Catholic Church
- Archdiocese: Archdiocese of Tours]
- In office: 21 December 1874 – 27 November 1883
- Predecessor: Félix-Pierre Fruchaud
- Successor: Guillaume-René Meignan
- Previous post: Bishop of Luçon (1861-1874)

Orders
- Ordination: 18 December 1830
- Consecration: 25 August 1861 by François Victor Rivet

Personal details
- Born: 30 April 1806 Gérardmer, Vosges, French Republic
- Died: 27 November 1883 (aged 77) Tours, Indre-et-Loire, French Republic
- Coat of arms

Charles Théodore Colet (30 April 1806 – 27 November 1883) was a French Roman Catholic Archbishop.

== Life ==
Colet was born in Gérardmer in France and was ordained a priest in 1831. In 1838 he became private secretary to François-Victor Rivet, Bishop of Dijon, and later served as Rivet's vicar general, a position he held for twenty-three years. On August 26, 1860 he was made a Knight of the Legion of Honour.

In June 1861, Napoleon III nominated Colet to succeed François-Augustin Delamare as bishop of Luçon. Pope Pius IX approved the appointment the following month, and on August 25 Colet was consecrated bishop at the Cathedral of Saint Benignus in Dijon with his friend and mentor, Bishop Rivet, serving as principal consecrator. In 1869, Colet authorized a diocesan catechism. He attended the First Vatican Council, and voted with the minority against the doctrine of papal infallibility. On March 4, 1874, he was made an officer of the Legion of Honour.

In November 1874, Colet was nominated to succeed Felix Pierre Fruchaud as Archbishop of Tours. In December, Pius IX approved the appointment, and Colet was installed at the Cathedral of Saint Gatianus in Tours on February 3, 1875. He supported Leo Dupont in his efforts to promote the local devotion to the Holy Face of Jesus. Dupont was well known among the Catholics of Tours for his piety and generosity. After Dupont's death in March 1876, the Archdiocese purchased his house on the Rue St. Etienne and established the Oratory of the Holy Face. The chapel was staffed by a community of priests canonically established by Archbishop Colet and called the "Priests of the Holy Face".(The Oratory still stands, now administered by the French Dominicans as the earlier group is now defunct.)

As he had done at Luçon, in 1879 he issued a diocesan catechism for Tours.

Archbishop Colet died in Tours on 27 November 1883. His funeral was held at the cathedral with Joseph-Hippolyte Guibert, Cardinal Archbishop of Paris presiding. Colet's tomb in the cathedral.

== Sources ==
- Colet, Charles-Théodore (1861). Vie de la Mére Elisabeth de la Trinité de Quatre-Barbes: religieuse carmélite à Beaunes (in French). Dijon: Héméry.
- Dorothy Scallan. The Holy Man of Tours. (1990) ISBN 0-89555-390-2
- Georges Simon, in: Société bibliographique (France) (1907). L'épiscopat français depuis le Concordat jusqu'à la Séparation (1802-1905) (in French). Paris: Librairie des Saints-Pères. pp. 308–309, 635.
