= Maria Pierina De Micheli =

Italian Roman Catholic sister

Blessed Maria Pierina De Micheli
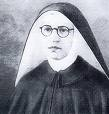
- Portrait of Maria, c. 1915
- Born: 11 September 1890; Milan, Italy
- Died: 26 July 1945 (aged 54); Centonara, Italy
- Venerated in: Roman Catholic Church
- Beatified: 30 May 2010, Rome by Archbishop Angelo Amato
- Feast: 26 July

Maria Pierina De Micheli (11 September 1890 – 26 July 1945) was a Roman Catholic religious sister who was born near Milan in Italy. She is best known for her association with devotion to the Holy Face of Jesus and for introducing a medal bearing an image from the Shroud of Turin as part of this devotion. She was beatified on Sunday, 30 May 2010 at the Basilica di Santa Maria Maggiore in Rome.

== Early years ==
She was born Giuseppina De Micheli in Milan on 11 September 1890. She had been aware from an early age of the Holy Face of Jesus devotion, which had been started almost a century earlier by a French Discalced Carmelite nun Mary of Saint Peter, of Tours, France. Giuseppina joined the Congregation of the Daughters of the Immaculate Conception in October 1913, and took the religious name Maria Pierina on 16 May 1914, when she made her vows. She was then sent to the motherhouse in Buenos Aires, Argentina, where she remained until 1921, and there her attachment to the Holy Face devotion grew stronger. After her return to Milan, she was eventually elected as mother superior of her house and began to spread the devotion.

== Visions ==
On the first Friday in Lent 1936, she reported a vision of Christ in which he appeared to her and said: "I will that my face, which reflects the intimate pains of my spirit, the suffering and the love of my heart, be more honored. He who meditates upon me, consoles me". Further reported visions of Jesus and Mary urged Maria Pierina to make a medal with the Holy Face of Jesus.

In 1938, she was sent to Rome, where she met the community's chaplain, the Benedictine Hildebrand Gregori. After some effort, she managed to obtain permission to reproduce the photograph of the Shroud of Turin and authorization from the Curia in Milan to proceed in 1940 with manufacturing what became known as the Holy Face Medal.

On the obverse, the medal bears a replica of the face on the Holy Shroud of Turin, surrounded by a quote from Psalm 66:2, "Illumina, Domine, vultum tuum super nos" ("May, O Lᴏʀᴅ, the light of Thy countenance shine upon us". On the reverse is an image of a radiant Sacred Host, the monogram of the Holy Name (IHS), with an inscription from Luke 24:29, "Mane nobiscum, Domine" ("Stay with us, O Lord").

== Approval of the Holy Face medal ==
The first medal of the Holy Face was offered to Pope Pius XII, who approved the devotion and the medal. She had also reported that Jesus wanted a special feast on the day before Ash Wednesday in honor of his Holy Face, to be preceded by a novena (9 days) of prayers. In 1958, Pope Pius XII declared the Feast of the Holy Face of Jesus as Shrove Tuesday (the day before Ash Wednesday).

== Final years ==
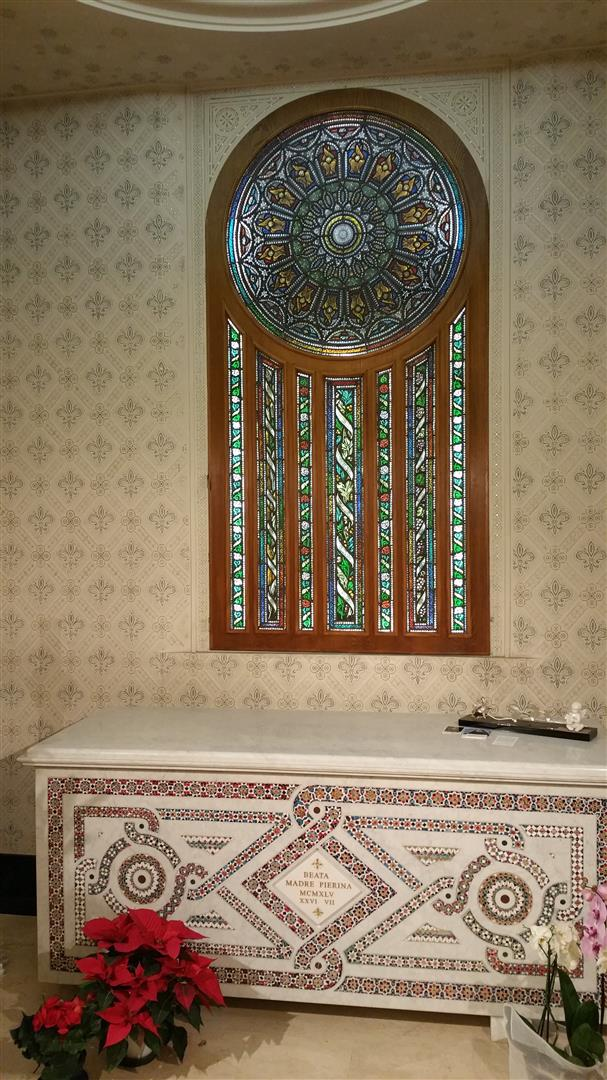
Tomb of Blessed Maria Pierina

In 1941, she wrote in her diary: "I feel a deep longing to live always united to Jesus, to love Him intensely because my death can only be a transport of love with my Spouse, Jesus." Maria Pierina died on Thursday, 26 July 1945 in Milan. Her remains are buried at the Holy Spirit Institute in Rome.

In April 2009, Pope Benedict XVI formally recognized a miracle attributed to her intercession. She was beatified on Sunday, 30 May 2010, at the Basilica di Santa Maria Maggiore in Rome by Archbishop Angelo Amato, Prefect of the Congregation for the Causes of Saints in the Roman Curia. Although he was not present for the beatification Mass, Pope Benedict XVI noted her "extraordinary devotion" to the Holy Face of Christ at the weekly papal Angelus address the following Sunday.

== Sources ==
- Maria Ildefonsa Rigamonti, Missionary or messenger of the Holy Face: Sister Maria Pierina de Micheli, St. Leonards-on-Sea: King Bros., 1957
- Dorothy Scallan, Emeric B Scallan, 1994 The Life & Revelations of Sr. Mary of St. Peter ISBN 0-89555-389-9
- Joan Carroll Cruz, Saintly Men of Modern Times. (2003) ISBN 1-931709-77-7
