= Reparation (theology) =

Theological actions to expiate sins

Reparation is a Christian theological concept closely connected with those of atonement and satisfaction. In ascetical theology, reparation is the making of amends for insults given to God through sin, either one's own or another's. The response of man is to be reparation through adoration, prayer, and sacrifice. In Roman Catholic tradition, an act of reparation is a prayer or devotion with the intent to expiate the "sins of others", e.g. for the repair of the sin of blasphemy, the sufferings of Jesus Christ or as Acts of Reparation to the Virgin Mary.

== Theological perspective ==
According to Thomas Slater, writing in the Catholic Encyclopedia, reparation is a theological concept closely connected with the concepts of atonement and satisfaction. Although God could have chosen to condone the sins of humanity, in divine providence, he instead judged it better to demand satisfaction through reparation and penance for sins of humanity. In Catholic teaching, it is better for the education of man that wrongdoing on humanity's part should entail the necessity of making satisfaction; this satisfaction was made adequately to God by the suffering, passion and death of Jesus Christ. By voluntarily submitting to his passion and death on the cross, Jesus thus atoned for man's disobedience and sin, and made reparation to God for the offenses of humanity.

In Catholic teaching, through the merits obtained by the death of Jesus, mankind is restored to grace, which enables humanity to add prayers, works and trials to those of Jesus "and fill up those things that are wanting of the sufferings of Christ, in my flesh, for his body, which is the church" (Colossians 1:24). Mankind thus makes reparation to the justice of God for their sins, and by virtue of the Communion of the Saints, the oneness and solidarity of the mystical Body of Christ, can also make satisfaction and reparation for the sins of others.

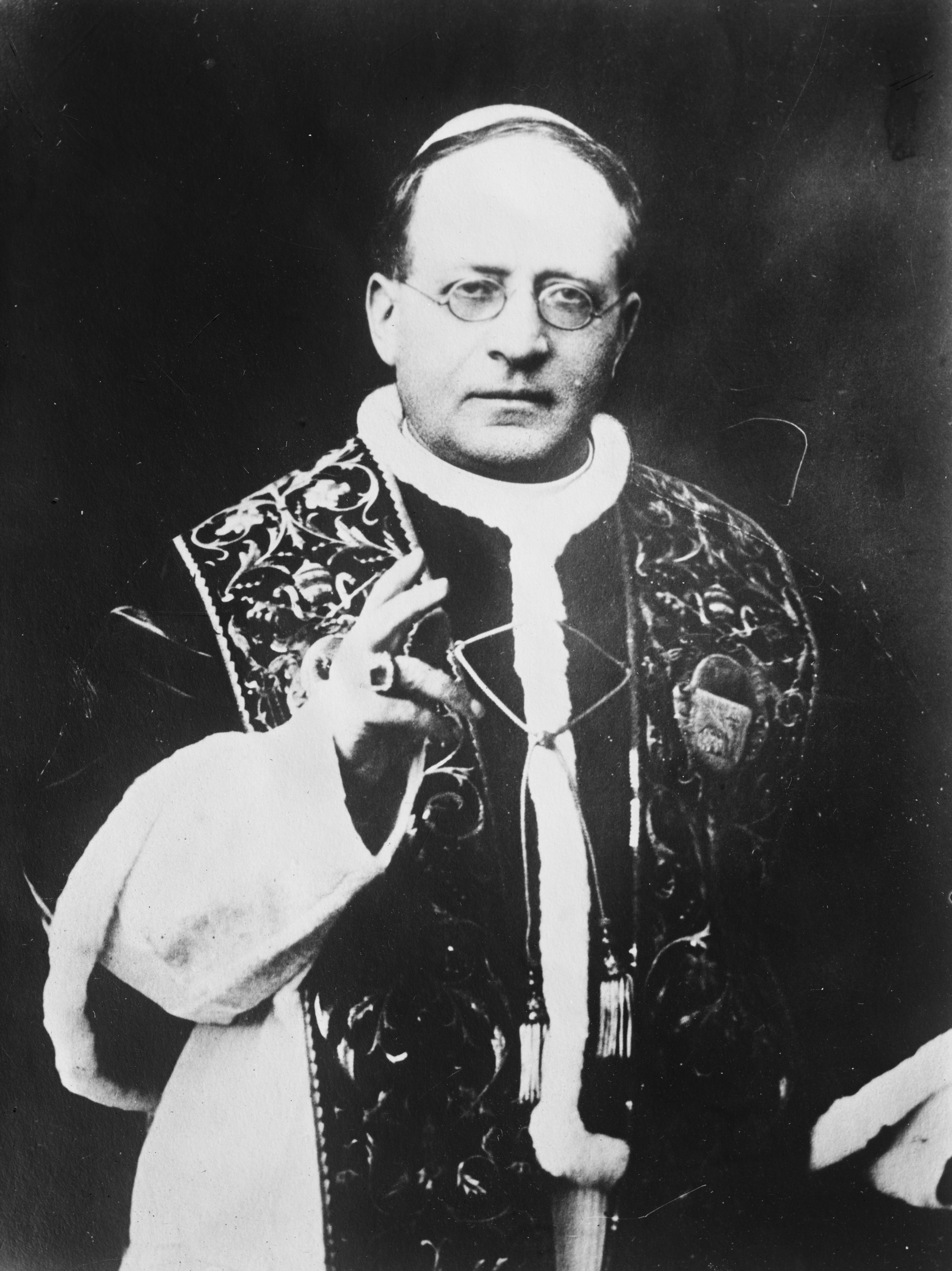
Pius XI

In his encyclical letter Miserentissimus Redemptor Pope Pius XI said:

The creature's love should be given in return for the love of the Creator, another thing follows from this at once, namely that to the same uncreated Love, if so be it has been neglected by forgetfulness or violated by offense, some sort of compensation must be rendered for the injury, and this debt is commonly called by the name of reparation.

Pope Francis, adopting teachings from Pope John Paul II, outlines and explains the "proper meaning" of the term "reparation" in his encyclical letter Dilexit nos (2024), referring to a mode of action which the Christian believer, with the help of grace, can "offer" to Christ the redeemer:

- to repent is to acknowledge that individual sins have a social dimension, and reparation in cooperation with Christ enables the believer to "restore goodness and beauty to the world";
- in another, complementary, approach to reparation, the believer cooperates with God because "God has in some way sought to limit himself" in such a way that human cooperation is part of the divine will for redemption.

Francis extends this idea, proposing "that we develop this means of reparation, which is, in a word, to offer the heart of Christ a new possibility of spreading in this world the flames of his ardent and gracious love": in the acts of fraternal love through which believers heal the wounds of the Church and of the world, ... they offer new ways for the healing power of the heart of Christ to express itself.

== Historical perspective ==
In 1654 Catherine de Bar founded the Benedictine Nuns of Perpetual Adoration of the Blessed Sacrament in Paris.

The Divine Praises were originally written in Italian by Luigi Felici, a Jesuit priest, in 1797 for the purpose of making reparation after saying or hearing sacrilege or blasphemy.

Some Catholic organizations whose focus was reparation included the Archconfraternity of Reparation for blasphemy and the neglect of Sunday, founded by Bishop Pierre Louis Parisis in 1847; and the Archconfraternity of the Holy Face, founded by Leo Dupont in 1851.

The Mass, the re-presentation of the sacrifice of Calvary, was according to Thomas Aquinas specially suited to make reparation for sin. The Mass of Reparation is a particular apostolate of the Norbertines. A confraternity to promote the devotion was founded by the Norbertine sister Rose of Bonlieu. Members promise to attend one extra Mass during the week in reparation for all those who neglect their Sunday obligation. In 1886 Pope Leo XIII raised the group to an Archconfraternity of the Mass of Reparation.

The Prayerful Sodality founded by Hildebrand Gregori in 1950 became the Congregation of the Benedictine Sisters of the Reparation of the Holy Face in 1977.

Scriptural studies in Catholic theology after the Second Vatican Council have developed a Trinitarian focus on "the self-offering of believers in union with Christ by which they share in his covenant relationship with the Father."

Some Marian apparitions have purportedly mentioned the need for reparation.

== Acts of Reparation ==
=== Acts of Reparation to The Holy Trinity ===
The Fatima prayer to the Holy Trinity is based on the purported 20th century apparitions of Our Lady of Fatima, and is attributed to an angel who appeared to the visionaries. It is sometimes called the "Angel Prayer".

O Most Holy Trinity, Father, Son and Holy Spirit, I adore Thee profoundly. I offer Thee the most precious Body, Blood, Soul and Divinity of Jesus Christ present in all the tabernacles of the world, in reparation for the outrages, sacrileges and indifferences by which He is offended. By the infinite merits of the Sacred Heart of Jesus and the Immaculate Heart of Mary I beg the conversion of poor sinners.

=== Acts of Reparation to Jesus Christ ===
Catholic tradition includes specific prayers and devotions as acts of reparation for insults and blasphemies against Jesus Christ. Pope John Paul II referred to reparation as the "unceasing effort to stand beside the endless crosses on which the Son of God continues to be crucified".

=== First Thursdays adoration ===
Practicing Eucharistic adoration before the tabernacle (especially made in front of the most forgotten and abandoned tabernacles) as part of the first Thursdays devotion is a Catholic devotion to offer reparation for the Holy Wounds of Christ.

=== First Fridays ===
The idea of reparation is an essential element in the Roman Catholic devotion to the Sacred Heart of Jesus. Receiving Holy Communion as part of the first Fridays devotion is a Catholic devotion to offer reparations for sin. In the visions of Christ reported by Margaret Mary Alacoque in the 17th century, several promises were made to those people that practiced the first Friday devotions, one of which included final perseverance.

In many Catholic communities the practice of the Holy Hour of meditation during the exposition of the Blessed Sacrament during the First Fridays is encouraged.

=== The Golden Arrow Prayer ===
The "Golden Arrow prayer" is part of devotion to the Holy Name of Jesus first introduced in 1844 by Mary of Saint Peter, a Discalced Carmelite. She wrote that an act of sacrilege or blasphemy is like a "poisoned arrow", hence the name "Golden Arrow" for this reparatory prayer.

=== Rosary of the Holy Wounds ===
The Rosary of the Holy Wounds is a Rosary based prayer directed to the sufferings of Jesus and was first presented by Marie Martha Chambon, a Visitation nun who lived in Chambéry, France and died in 1907.

== Institutions ==
Specific Roman Catholic organizations exist for this purpose. The Archconfraternity of Reparation for blasphemy and the neglect of Sunday was founded by Pierre Louis Parisis in 1847 and the Archconfraternity of the Holy Face was founded in 1851 by Leo Dupont, the "Holy Man of Tours". In 1950, the abbot Hildebrand Gregori formed the organization "Prayerful Sodality" which in 1977 became the Pontifical Congregation of the Benedictine Sisters of the Reparation of the Holy Face.

== Prayers ==
A number of prayers such as the Act of Reparation to the Virgin Mary appeared in the Raccolta, a collection of Catholic prayers and good works with attached indulgences. The Raccolta included a number of diverse prayers for reparation. The Raccolta was deprecated in 1968. (Note: In 1968 Enchiridion Indulgentiarum (EI) replaced Raccolta to comply with Pope Paul VI's 1967 Indulgentiarum doctrina. EI lists "only the most important prayers and works of piety, charity and penance" that have an attached indulgence.)

== See also ==
- Acts of Reparation to the Virgin Mary
- Apostle of the Holy Face
- Visions of Jesus and Mary
