= Five Holy Wounds =

Wounds afflicted to Jesus in the gospel

In Catholic tradition, the Five Holy Wounds, also known as the Five Sacred Wounds or the Five Precious Wounds, are the five piercing wounds that Jesus Christ suffered during his crucifixion. The wounds have been the focus of particular devotions, especially in the late Middle Ages, and have often been reflected in church music and art.

== The wounds ==
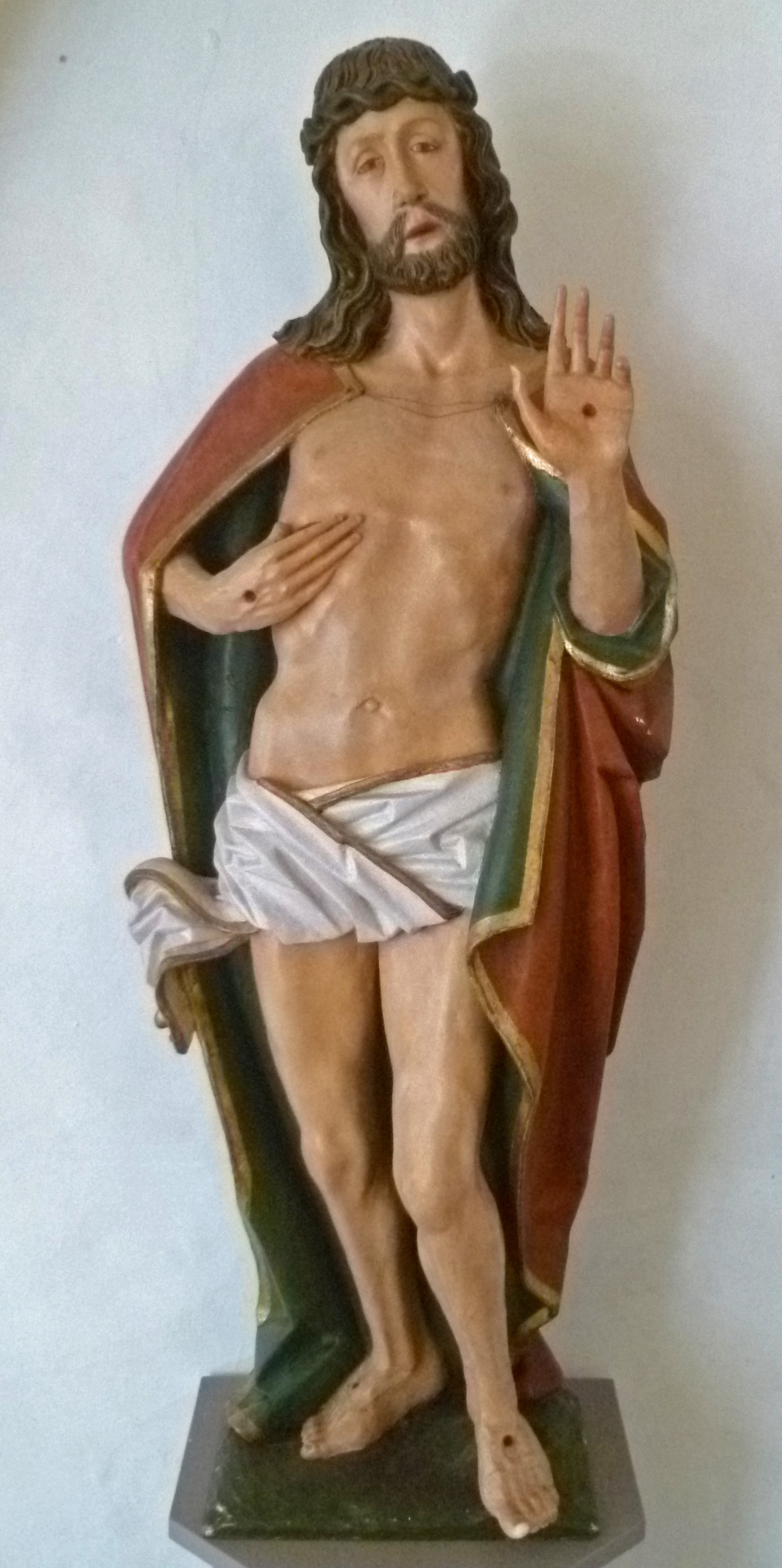
Christ after his Resurrection, with the ostentatio vulnerum, showing his wounds, Austria, c. 1500

The five wounds comprised 1) the nail hole in his right hand, 2) the nail hole in his left hand, 3) the nail hole in his right foot, 4) the nail hole in his left foot, 5) the wound to his torso from the piercing of the spear. The wounds around Jesus' head from the crown of thorns and the lash marks from the flagellation do not qualify as they did not occur on the cross.

- Two of the wounds were through either his hands or his wrists, where nails were inserted to fix Jesus to the cross-beam of the cross on which he was crucified. According to forensic expert Frederick T. Zugibe, the most plausible region for the nail entry site in the case of Jesus is the upper part of the palm angled toward the wrist since this area can easily support the weight of the body, assures no bones are broken, marks the location where most people believed it to be, accounts for where most of the stigmatists have displayed their wounds and it is where artists through the centuries have designated it. This position would result in apparent lengthening of the fingers of the hand because of compression.
- Two were through the feet where the nail(s) passed through both to the vertical beam.
- The final wound was in the side of Jesus' chest, where, according to the New Testament, his body was pierced by the Lance of Longinus in order to be sure that he was dead. The Gospel of John states that blood and water poured out of this wound (John 19:34). Although the Gospels do not specify on which side he was wounded, it was conventionally shown in art as being on Jesus's proper right side, though some depictions, notably a number by Rubens, show it on the proper left.

The examination of the wounds by "Doubting Thomas" the Apostle, reported only in the Gospel of John at John 20:24–29, was the focus of much commentary and often depicted in art, where the subject has the formal name of the Incredulity of Thomas.

== Medieval context ==
According to the accounts of his crucifixion in the Christian gospels, in the course of his Passion, Jesus suffered various wounds, such as those from the crown of thorns and from the scourging at the pillar. Medieval popular piety focused upon the five wounds associated directly with Christ's crucifixion: the nail wounds on his hands and feet and the wound from the Holy Lance which pierced his side.

The revival of religious life and the zealous activity of Bernard of Clairvaux and Francis of Assisi in the 12th and 13th centuries, together with the enthusiasm of the Crusaders returning from the Holy Land, gave a rise in devotion to the Passion of Jesus Christ.

Many medieval prayers in honour of the Holy Wounds, including some attributed to Clare of Assisi, have been preserved. Mechtilde and Gertrude of Helfta were devoted to the Holy Wounds, the latter reciting daily a prayer in honour of the 5466 wounds, which, according to a medieval tradition, were inflicted on Jesus during his Passion. In the fourteenth century it was customary in southern Germany to recite fifteen Pater Nosters each day (which thus amounted to 5,475 in the course of a year) in memory of the Holy Wounds.

There was, in the medieval Missals, a special Mass in honour of Christ's wounds, known as the Golden Mass. During its celebration five candles were always lit and it was popularly held that if anyone should say or hear it on five consecutive days they would never suffer the pains of hellfire.

The Dominican Rosary also helped to promote devotion to the Holy Wounds, for while the fifty small beads refer to Mary, the five large beads and the corresponding Pater Nosters are intended to honour the Five Wounds of Christ. In some places it was customary to ring a bell at noon on Fridays to remind the faithful to recite five Paters and Aves in honour of the Holy Wounds.

== Devotions ==
=== Chaplet of the Five Wounds of Jesus ===
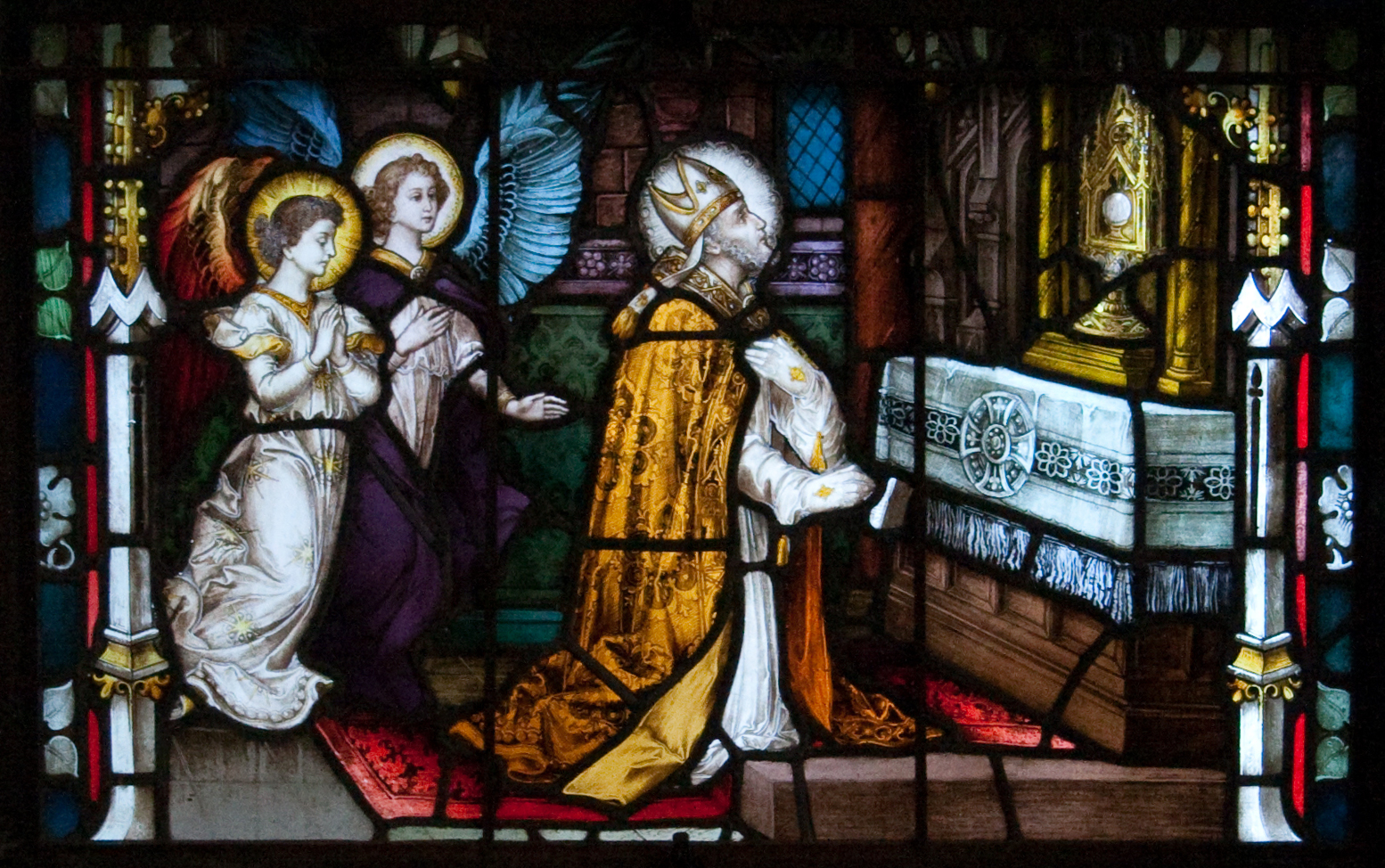
Alphonsus kneeling before the Blessed Sacrament, Carlow Cathedral.

In his 1761 book, The Passion and Death of Jesus Christ, Alphonsus Maria de Liguori, founder of the Redemptorist Fathers, listed among various pious exercises the Little Chaplet of the Five Wounds of Jesus Crucified.

Liguori wrote the devotional as a meditation on the five piercing wounds that Christ suffered during his crucifixion.

=== Chaplet of the Five Wounds ===
The "Chaplet of the Five Wounds" is a Passionist chaplet devoted to the Holy Wounds of Jesus, as a means to promote devotion to the Passion of Christ.

The chaplet is due to Paul Aloysius, the sixth superior general of the Passionists. It was developed in Rome in 1821. A corona of the Five Wounds was approved by Pope Leo XII on August 11, 1823. It received a second approval in 1851.

The devotion also honors the mystery of the risen Christ which has the marks of the Five Wounds. This chaplet has 25 beads, grouped into five sets. The Gloria Patri is said on each bead. At the end of each section of beads, a Hail Mary in honor of the sorrows of Mary is said. At the end of the chaplet, three additional Hail Marys are said in honor of her tears. The blessing of the beads is reserved to the Passionists.

=== Chaplet of the Holy Wounds ===
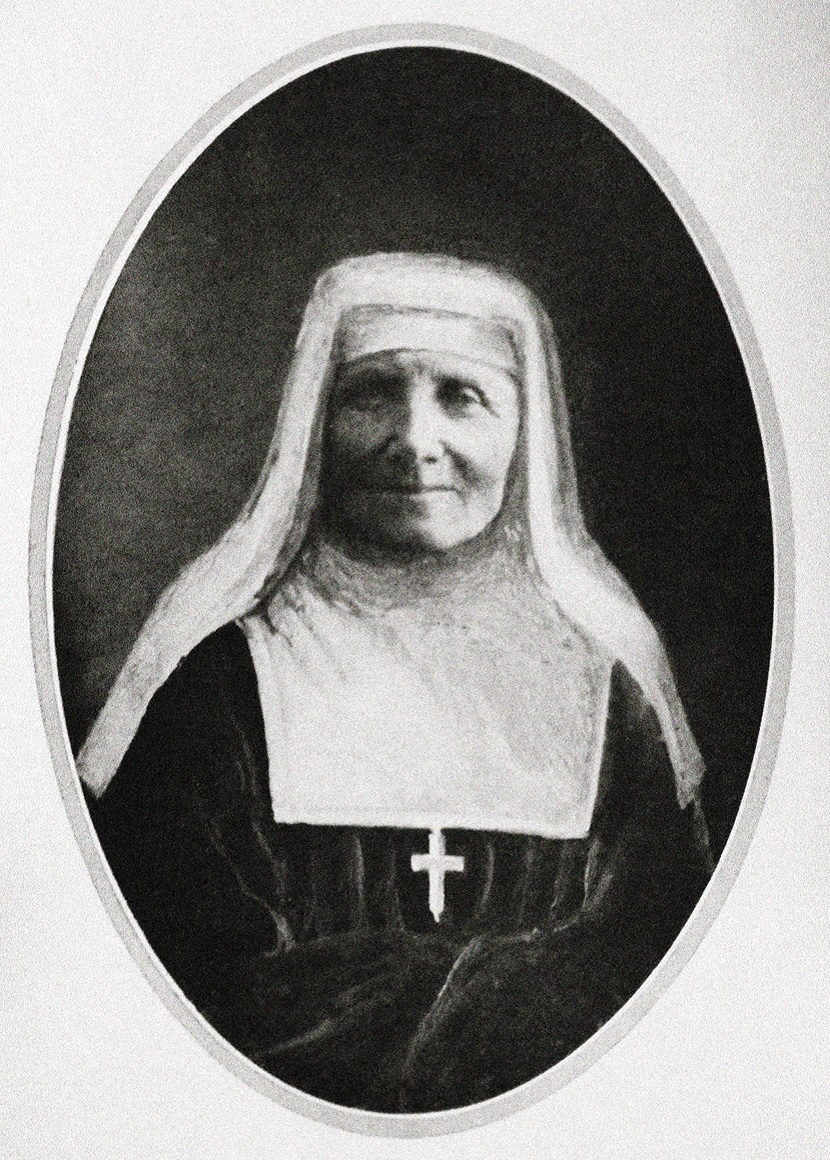
Sister Mary Martha Chambon

The Chaplet of the Holy Wounds (or "Holy Wounds Rosary") was first introduced at the beginning of the 20th century by Sister Mary Martha Chambon (March 6, 1841 – March 21, 1907), a Roman Catholic nun of the Monastery of the Order of the Visitation of Holy Mary in Chambéry, France.

Françoise Chambon was born March 6, 1841, to a poor farming family in the village of Croix Rouge, near Chambéry, in Savoy. Her first reported vision occurred when she was nine years old. As she was attending Good Friday services with her godmother, in the parish church of Lémenc, Françoise saw the crucified Jesus covered in wounds and blood. She said that later that year, when she received First Communion, she saw the baby Jesus, who told her, "Child, my favorite, so it will be every time you go to Holy Communion." She worked in the refectory at the boarding school.

At the age of twenty-one, she joined the Monastery of the Visitation Order in Chambéry, France and was given her name Marie–Marthe. She died on March 21, 1907; the cause for her beatification was introduced in 1937.

==== Private revelations ====
Mary Martha Chambon began to report visions of Jesus in 1866, telling her to contemplate the Holy Wounds. The mother superior kept a chronicle of her life which was published in 1923 and sold widely. The next year the Vatican granted an indulgence to those who said the following prayer, based on her reported visions: "Eternal Father I offer the wounds of Our Lord Jesus Christ, to heal those of our souls."

She reported that Jesus asked her to unite her sufferings with his in the Rosary of the Holy Wounds as an Act of Reparation for the sins of the world. She reported that Jesus told her that "[w]hen you offer My Holy Wounds for sinners, you must not forget to do so for the souls in Purgatory, as there are but few who think of their relief... The Holy Wounds are the treasure of treasures for the souls in Purgatory."

The Chaplet of the Holy Wounds is prayed on a standard five decade rosary. This chaplet was approved for the Order of the Visitation of Holy Mary in 1912, and was authorized for all Catholic Church by Decree of the Congregation for the Doctrine of the Faith on March 23, 1999.

==== Format of the Chaplet ====
One method of praying the chaplet consists of three prayers that are said on specific portions of the rosary beads as follows:

- The following prayer is said on the crucifix: "O Jesus, Divine Redeemer, be merciful to us and to the whole world. Amen."
- followed by the first three beads:
- "Holy God, Mighty God, Immortal God, have mercy on us and on the whole world. Amen" (This prayer is found in the later Chaplet of the Divine Mercy. It is used more extensively in the Eastern rites of the Catholic Church, where it is called the Trisagion.)
- "Grace and Mercy, O my Jesus, during present dangers; cover us with Your Precious Blood. Amen."
- "Eternal Father, grant us mercy through the Blood of Jesus Christ, Your only Son; grant us mercy we beseech You. Amen, Amen, Amen."
- The following prayer is said on the large beads of the rosary chain: "Eternal Father, I offer You the Wounds of Our Lord, Jesus Christ, to heal the wounds of our souls."
- The following prayer is said on the small beads of the rosary chain: "My Jesus, pardon and mercy, through the merits of Your Holy Wounds".

=== First Thursdays Devotion ===
The First Thursdays Devotion, also called the Act of Reparation to the Wounds of Jesus and to the Holy Eucharist, had its origin in the apparitions of Christ at Balazar, Portugal, reported by Alexandrina Maria da Costa in the 20th century.

=== Sacred Heart ===
In his encyclical letter of 2024, Dilexit nos, Pope Francis suggests that devotion to the Sacred Heart of Jesus emerged over time from a spirituality in the earlier centuries of the church which saw Jesus' wounded side "as a fountain of grace and a summons to a deep and loving encounter". In the same document he also affirms the observation made by Pope John Paul II that devotion to the Sacred Heart is part of the permanent endowment of Christian spirituality, because "throughout her history ... since the beginning, the Church has looked to the heart of Christ pierced on the Cross”.

== Symbolic use ==
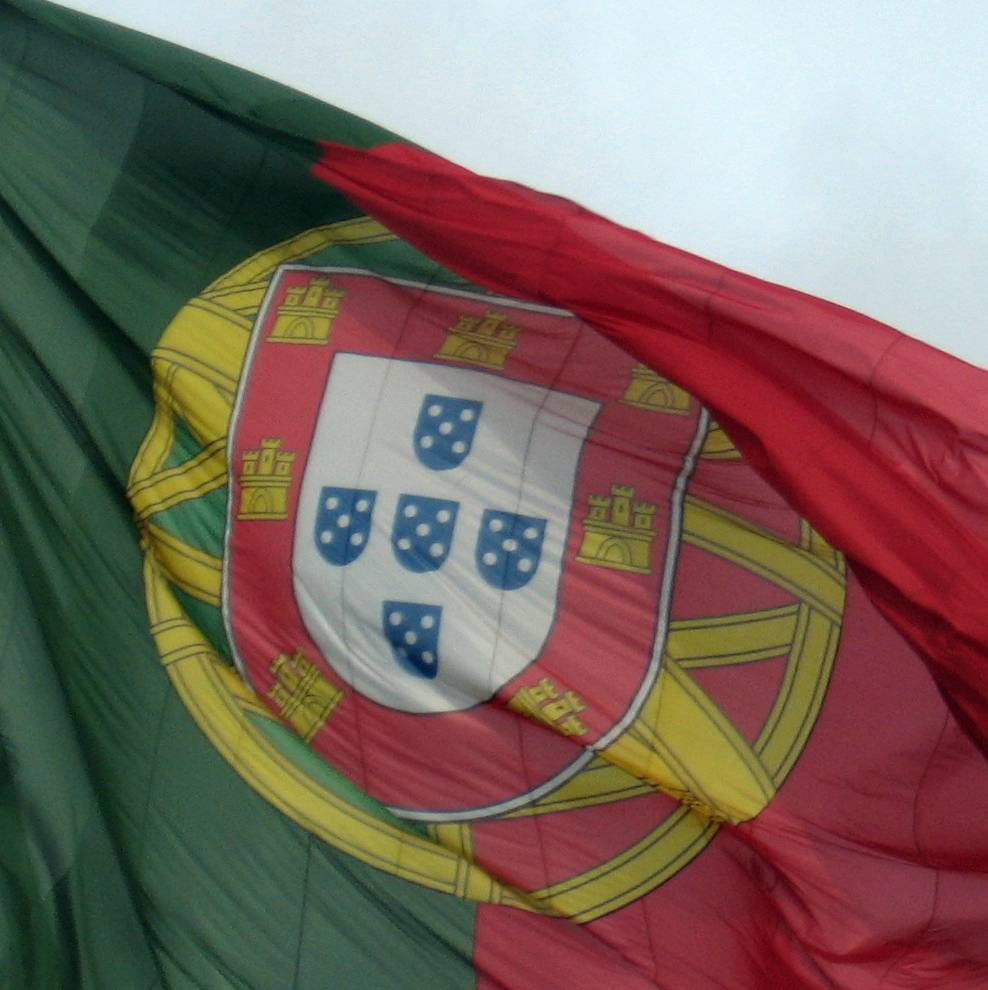
Flag of Portugal; the white dots inside the blue shields represent the Holy Wounds

As early as 1139 Afonso I of Portugal put the emblem of the Five Holy Wounds on his coat of arms as king of Portugal.

The Cross of Jerusalem, or "Crusaders' Cross", remembers the Five Holy Wounds through its five crosses. The Holy Wounds have been used as a symbol of Christianity. Participants in the Crusades would often wear the Jerusalem cross, an emblem representing the Holy Wounds; a version is still in use today in the flag of Georgia. The "Five Wounds" was the emblem of the "Pilgrimage of Grace", a northern English rebellion in response to Henry VIII's Dissolution of the Monasteries.

Prior to its modern association with the occult, the pentagram was used as a symbol for the Holy Wounds. The pentagram plays an important symbolic role in the 14th-century English poem Sir Gawain and the Green Knight, in which the symbol decorates the shield of the hero, Gawain. The unnamed poet credits the symbol's origin to King Solomon, and explains that each of the five interconnected points represents a virtue tied to a group of five: Gawain is perfect in his five senses and five fingers, faithful to the Five Wounds of Christ, takes courage from the five joys that Mary had of Jesus, and exemplifies the five virtues of knighthood.

When consecrating an altar a number of Christian churches anoint it in five places, indicative of the Five Holy Wounds. Eastern Orthodox churches will sometimes have five domes on them, symbolizing the Five Holy Wounds, along with the alternate symbolism of Christ and the Four Evangelists.

== In sacred music ==
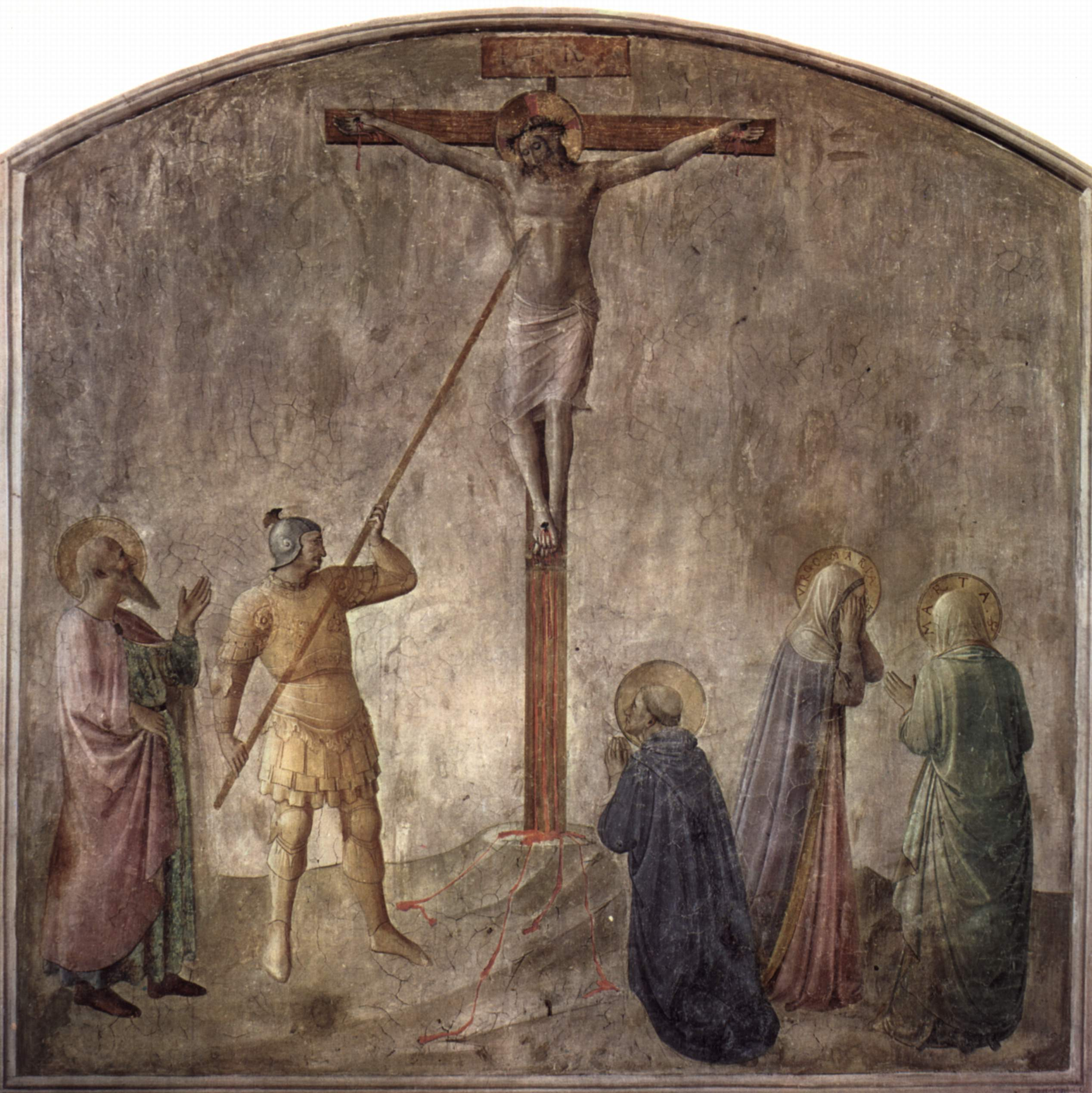
The piercing of Jesus's side by the Holy Lance of Longinus, fresco by Fra Angelico (1395–1455), San Marco, Florence

The medieval poem Salve mundi salutare (also known as the Rhythmica oratio) was formerly ascribed to Bonaventure or Bernard of Clairvaux, but now is thought more likely to have been written by the Cistercian abbot Arnulf of Leuven (d. 1250). A lengthy meditation upon the Passion of Christ, it is composed of seven parts, each pertaining to one of the members of Christ's crucified body. Popular in the 17th-century, it was arranged as a cycle of seven cantatas in 1680 by Dieterich Buxtehude. His 1680 Membra Jesu Nostri is divided into seven parts, each addressed to a different member of Christ's crucified body: feet, knees, hands, side, breast, heart, and head framed by selected Old Testament verses containing prefigurements.

The cantata has come down to us more widely known as the hymn O Sacred Head Surrounded named for the closing stanza of a poem addressed to Christ's head which begins "Salve caput cruentatum." Translated by Lutheran hymnist Paul Gerhardt, Johann Sebastian Bach arranged the melody and used five stanzas of the hymn in his "St Matthew Passion". Franz Liszt included an arrangement of this hymn at the sixth station, Saint Veronica wipes the Holy Face, in his Via crucis (Stations of the Cross).

== In art ==
The Incredulity of Saint Thomas by Caravaggio (1601–02)

In art the subject of Doubting Thomas, or the Incredulity of Saint Thomas, has been common since at least the early 6th century, when it appears in the mosaics at the Basilica of Sant'Apollinare Nuovo in Ravenna, and on the Monza ampullae. Among the most famous examples are the sculpted pair of Christ and St. Thomas by Andrea del Verrocchio (1467–1483) for the Orsanmichele in Florence and The Incredulity of Saint Thomas by Caravaggio, now in Potsdam.

In the later Middle Ages Jesus with one side of his robe pulled back, displaying the wound in his side and his other four wounds (called the ostentatio vulnerum, "display of the wounds"), was taken from images with the Doubting Thomas and turned into a pose adopted by Jesus alone, who often places his own fingers into the wound in his side. This form became a common feature of single iconic figures of Jesus and subjects such as the Last Judgement (where Bamberg Cathedral has an early example of about 1235), Christ in Majesty, the Man of Sorrows and Christ with the Arma Christi, and was used to emphasize Christ's suffering as well as the fact of his Resurrection.

Devotional art focused on the side wound was also widespread; some books of prayers from late-medieval Germany, for instance, would display the side wound surrounded by text specifying its exact dimensions.

== See also ==
- Acts of Reparation
- First Thursdays Devotion
- Man of Sorrows
- Saint Longinus
- Stigmata

== Sources ==
- Freze, Michael. 1993, Voices, Visions, and Apparitions, OSV Publishing ISBN 0-87973-454-X
- Kerr, Anne Cecil. Sister Mary Martha Chambon of the Visitation B. Herder Publishing, 1937
- Schiller, Gertrud, Iconography of Christian Art, Vol. II, 1972 (English trans from German), Lund Humphries, London, ISBN 0-85331-324-5
