= Passion of Jesus =

Final period in the life of Jesus, before his crucifixion and death

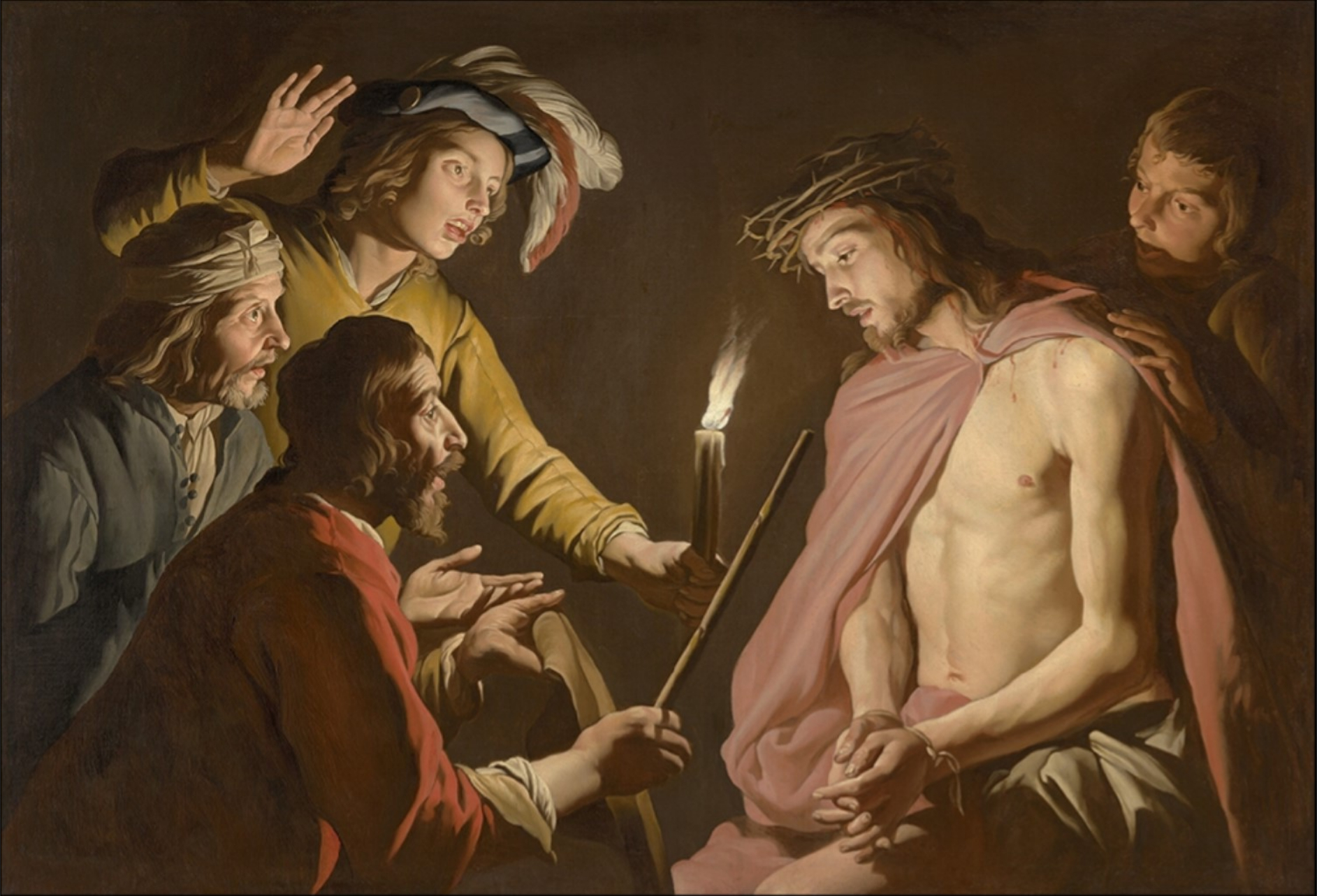
Christ Crowned with Thorns by Matthias Stom (c. 1633–1639) shows Jesus in his Passion as the "Lord of Patience" with the crown of thorns and sceptre reed, being mocked by Roman soldiers.

The Passion (from Latin patior 'to suffer, bear, endure') is the short final period before the death of Jesus, described in the four canonical gospels. It is commemorated in Christianity every year during Holy Week.

The Passion may include, among other events, Jesus's triumphal entry into Jerusalem, his cleansing of the Temple, his anointing, the Last Supper, his agony, his arrest, his trial before the Sanhedrin and his trial before Pontius Pilate, his crucifixion and death, and his burial. Those parts of the four canonical gospels that describe these events are known as the Passion narratives. In some Christian communities, commemoration of the Passion also includes remembrance of the sorrow of Mary, the mother of Jesus, on the Friday of Sorrows.

The word passion has taken on a more general application and now may also apply to accounts of the suffering and death of Christian martyrs, sometimes using the Latin form passio.

== Narratives according to the four canonical gospels ==
Accounts of the Passion are found in the four canonical gospels: Matthew, Mark, Luke and John. Three of these, Matthew, Mark, and Luke, known as the Synoptic Gospels, give similar accounts. The Gospel of John account varies significantly.

Scholars do not agree on which events surrounding the death of Jesus should be considered part of the Passion narrative, and which ones merely precede and succeed the actual Passion narrative itself. For example, Puskas and Robbins (2011) commence the Passion after Jesus's arrest and before his resurrection, thus only including the trials, crucifixion and death of Jesus. In Pope Benedict XVI's Jesus of Nazareth: Holy Week (2011), the term Passion completely coincides with the crucifixion and death of Jesus; it does not include earlier events and specifically excludes the burial and resurrection. Others such as Matson and Richardson (2014) take a broader approach and consider the triumphal entry, the last supper, the trial before Pilate, the crucifixion, the burial, and the resurrection collectively as constituting the "Passion Week".

=== Comprehensive narrative ===
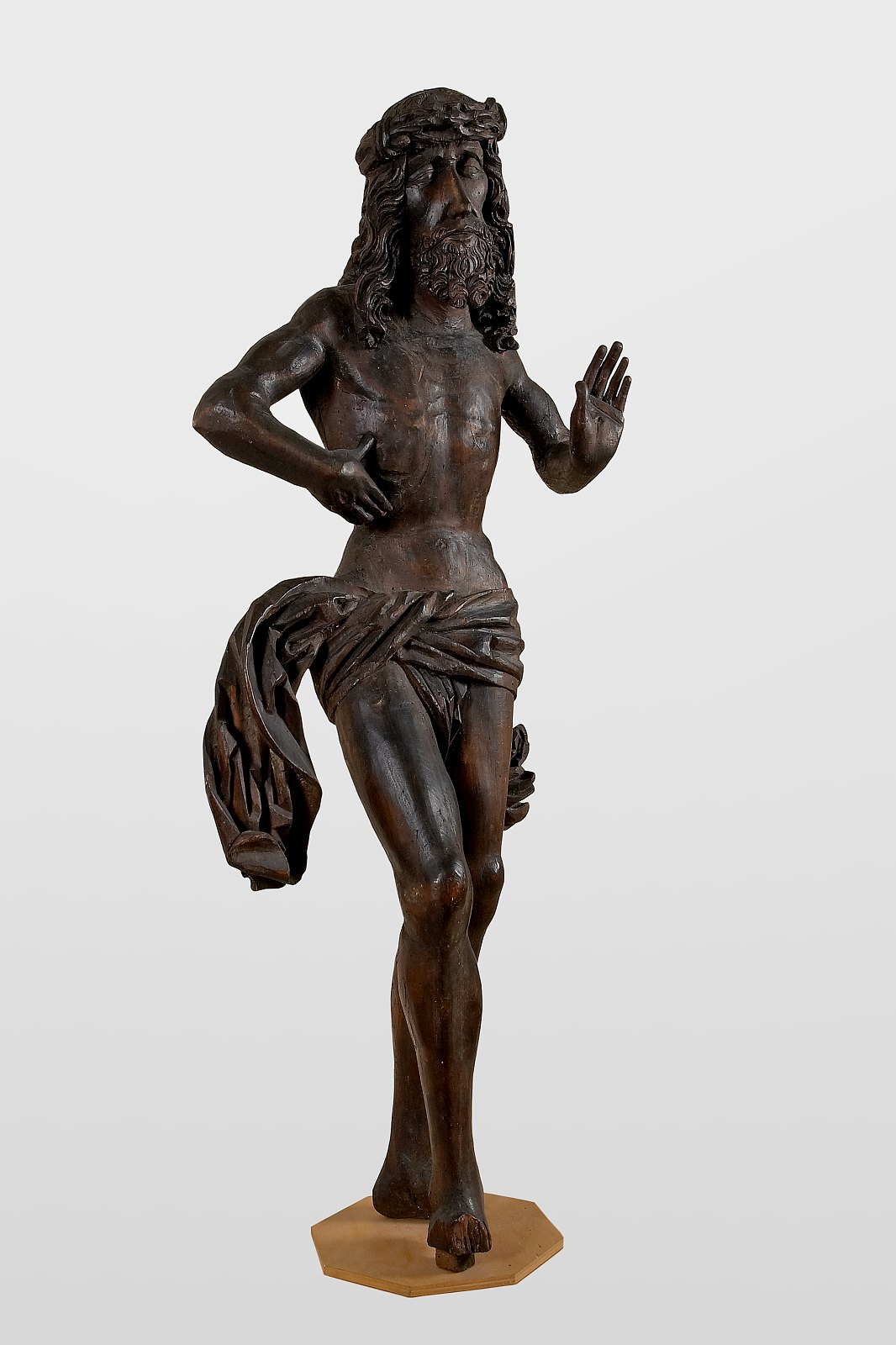
16th century Pained Christ of Cheb, Czech Republic

Taking an inclusive approach, the "Passion" may include:

- Triumphal entry into Jerusalem: some people welcome Jesus when he enters Jerusalem.
- The Cleansing of the Temple: Jesus expels livestock merchants and money-changers from the Temple of Jerusalem.
- The Anointing of Jesus by a woman during a meal a few days before Passover. Jesus says that for this she will always be remembered.
- The Last Supper shared by Jesus and his disciples in Jerusalem. Jesus gives final instructions, predicts his betrayal, and tells them all to remember him.
- Jesus predicts the Denial of Peter: on the path to Gethsemane after the meal, Jesus tells the disciples they will all fall away that night. After Peter protests he will not, Jesus says Peter will deny him thrice before the cock crows.
- The Agony in the Garden: later that night at Gethsemane, Jesus prays while the disciples rest. Luke 22:43–44 adds that Jesus was terrified, and sweating blood. However, the oldest manuscripts of the Gospel of Luke do not contain these two verses, the other three canonical gospels do not mention this event either, and various manuscripts contain these verses elsewhere, even in the Gospel of Matthew (suggesting repeated attempts at insertion); thus, most modern scholars consider this tradition a later Christian interpolation, probably to counter docetism.
- The Arrest of Jesus: then Judas Iscariot leads in either "a detachment of soldiers and some officials from the chief priests and Pharisees" (accompanied according to Luke's Gospel by the chief priests and elders), or a "large crowd armed with swords and clubs, sent from the chief priests and elders of the people," which arrests Jesus; all his disciples run away. During the arrest in Gethsemane, someone (Peter according to John) takes a sword and cuts off the ear of the high priest's servant, Malchus.
- The Sanhedrin trial of Jesus at the high priest's palace, later that night. The arresting party brings Jesus to the Sanhedrin (Jewish supreme court); according to Luke's Gospel, Jesus is beaten by his Jewish guards prior to his examination; the court examines him, in the course of which, according to John's Gospel, Jesus is struck in the face by one of the Jewish officials; the court determine he deserves to die. According to Matthew's Gospel, the court then "spat in his face and struck him with their fists." They then send him to Pontius Pilate. According to the synoptic gospels, the high priest who examines Jesus is Caiaphas; in John, Jesus is also interrogated by Annas, Caiaphas' father-in-law.
- The Denial of Peter in the courtyard outside the high priest's palace, the same time. Peter has followed Jesus and joined the crowd awaiting Jesus' fate; they suspect he is a sympathizer, so Peter repeatedly denies he knows Jesus. Suddenly, the cock crows and Peter remembers what Jesus had said.
- Pilate's trial of Jesus, early morning. Pontius Pilate, the Roman governor of Judea, questions Jesus, but does not find any fault with him. The Jewish leaders and the crowd demand Jesus' death; Pilate gives them the choice of saving Barabbas, a criminal, or saving Jesus. In response to the crowd Pilate sends Jesus out to be crucified.
- The Way of the Cross: Jesus and two other convicts are forced to walk to their place of execution. According to the Synoptics, Simon of Cyrene is forced to carry Jesus's cross, while John writes that Jesus carried his cross himself.
- The Crucifixion of Jesus: Jesus and the two other convicts are nailed to crosses at Golgotha, a hill outside Jerusalem, later morning through mid afternoon. Various sayings of Jesus on the cross are recorded in the gospels before he dies.
- The Burial of Jesus: the body of Jesus is taken down from the cross and put in a tomb by Joseph of Arimathea (and Nicodemus according to John).
- The Resurrection of Jesus: Jesus rises from the dead, leaving behind an empty tomb and reportedly appearing to several of his followers.

=== Differences between the canonical gospels ===
The Gospel of Luke states that Pilate sends Jesus to be judged by Herod Antipas because as a Galilean he is under his jurisdiction. Herod is excited at first to see Jesus and hopes Jesus will perform a miracle for him; he asks Jesus several questions but Jesus does not answer. Herod then mocks him and sends him back to Pilate after giving him an "elegant" robe to wear.

All the Gospels relate that a man named Barabbas was released by Pilate instead of Jesus. Bar-abbas means "son of the father". Some manuscripts of Matthew call him "Jesus Barabbas", suggesting that an early version of the story contrasted the fate of two men both named Jesus. Matthew, Mark and John have Pilate offer a choice between Jesus and Barabbas to the crowd; Luke lists no choice offered by Pilate, but represents the crowd demanding his release.

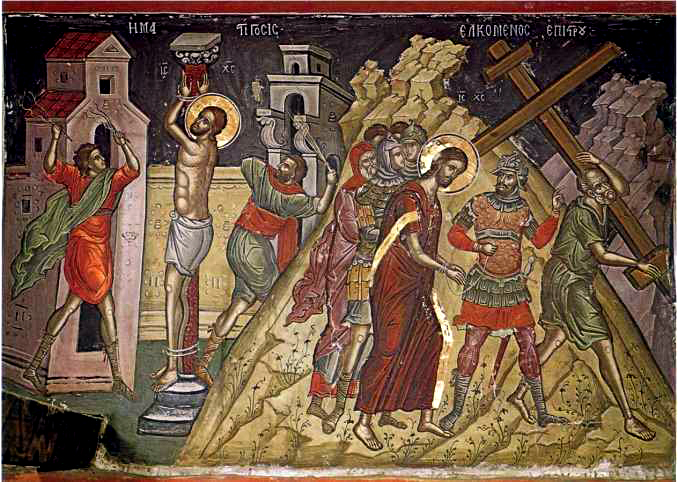
Icon of the Passion, detail showing (left) the Flagellation and (right) Ascent to Golgotha (fresco by Theophanes the Cretan, Stavronikita Monastery, Mount Athos).

In all the Gospels, Pilate asks Jesus if he is King of the Jews, and Jesus replies, "So you say". Once condemned by Pilate, he is flogged before execution. The canonical gospels, except Luke, record that Jesus is then taken by the soldiers to the Praetorium where, according to Matthew and Mark, the whole contingent of soldiers has been called together. They place a purple robe on him, put a crown of thorns on his head, and according to Matthew, put a rod in his hand. They mock him by hailing him as "King of the Jews", paying a mocking homage and hitting him on the head with the rod.

According to the Gospel of John, Pilate has Jesus brought out a second time, wearing the purple robe and the crown of thorns, in order to appeal his innocence before the crowd, saying Ecce homo, ("Behold the man"). In the Gospel of John, the priests urge the crowd to demand Jesus's death. Pilate resigns himself to the decision, washing his hands (according to Matthew) before the people as a sign that Jesus's blood will not be upon him. In the Gospel of Matthew they reply, "His blood be on us and on our children".

Mark and Matthew record that Jesus is returned his own clothes, prior to being led out for execution. According to the Gospel accounts, he is forced, like other victims of crucifixion, to drag his own cross to Golgotha, meaning "place of a skull", the location of the execution. The three Synoptic Gospels refer to a man called Simon of Cyrene, who is made to carry the cross (Mark 15:21, Matthew 27:32, Luke 23:26), while in the Gospel of John (John 19:17), Jesus is made to carry his own cross. The Gospel of Mark gives the names of Simon's children as Alexander and Rufus. The Gospel of Luke refers to Simon carrying the cross after Jesus, in that it states: "they laid hold upon one Simon, a Cyrenian, coming out of the country, and on him they laid the cross, that he might bear it after Jesus". Luke adds that Jesus's female followers follow, mourning his fate, but that he responds by quoting Hosea 10:8.

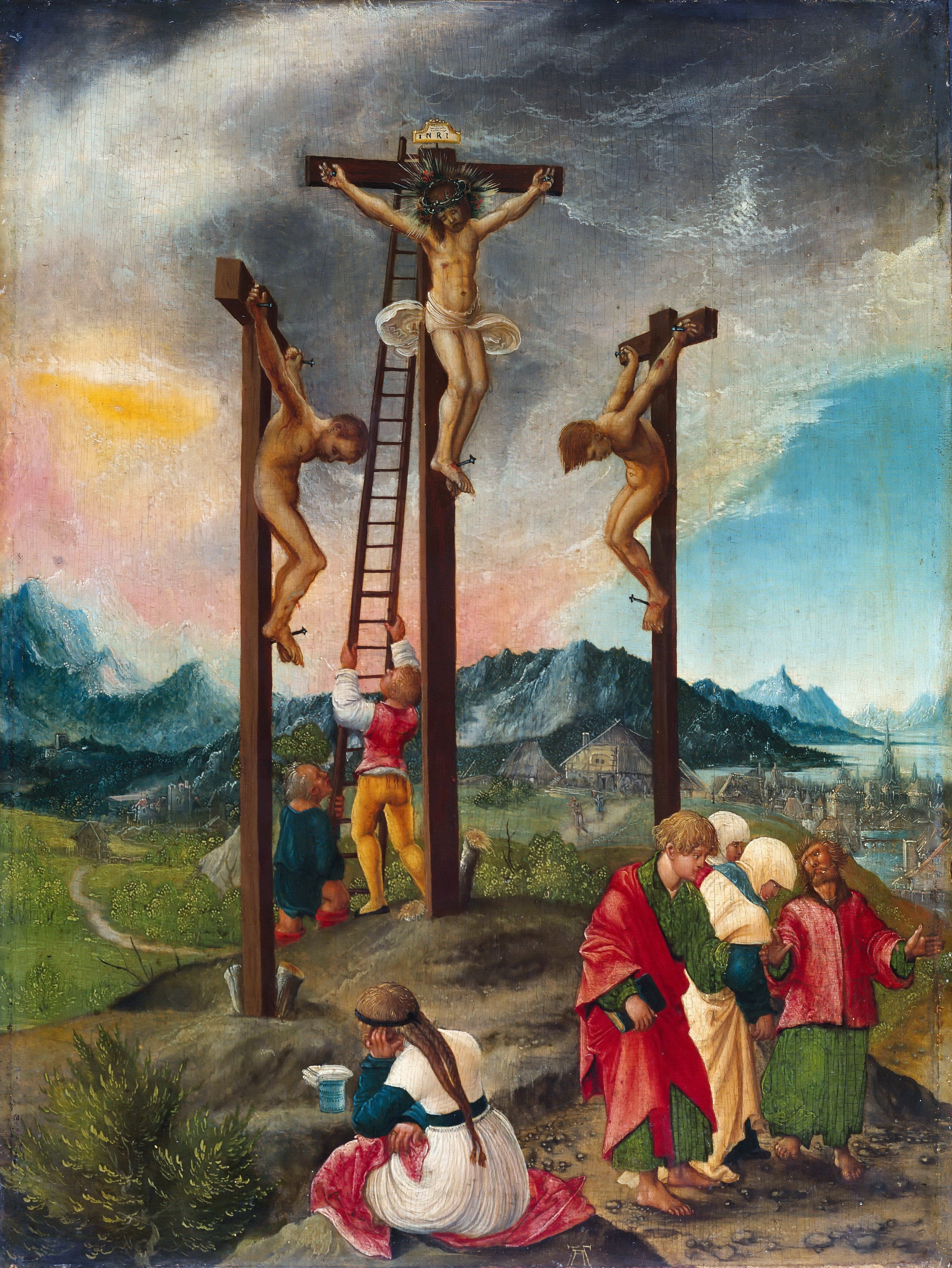
Crucifixion by Albrecht Altdorfer (c. 1526)

The Synoptic Gospels state that on arrival at Golgotha, Jesus is offered wine laced with myrrh to lessen the pain, but he refuses it. Jesus is then crucified, according to Mark, at "the third hour" (9 a.m.) the morning after the Passover meal, but according to John he is handed over to be crucified at "the sixth hour" (noon) the day before the Passover meal. Many resolve this by saying that the Synoptics use Jewish time, and that John uses Roman time.

Pilate has a plaque fixed to Jesus's cross inscribed, (according to John) in Hebrew, Greek and Latin – Iesus Nazarenus Rex Iudeorum, meaning 'Jesus of Nazareth, King of the Jews'. The original Greek of the Gospels reads Ἰησοῦς ὁ Ναζωραῖος ὁ Bασιλεὺς τῶν Ἰουδαίων, 'Jesus the Nazarene, King of the Jews'. In the Gospel of Mark, the plaque says 'King of the Jews'. The soldiers then divide Jesus's clothes among themselves, except for one garment for which they cast lots. The Gospel of John claims that this fulfills a prophecy from Psalm 22:18. Some of the crowd who have been following taunt Jesus by saying, "He trusts in God; let God deliver him now!" The statement suggests that Jesus might perform a miracle to release himself from the cross.

According to the Gospels, two thieves are also crucified, one on each side of him. According to Luke, one of the thieves reviles Jesus, while the other, known as the penitent thief, declares Jesus innocent and begs that he might be remembered when Jesus comes to his kingdom.

John records that Mary, his mother, and two other women stand by the cross as does a disciple, described as the one whom Jesus loved. Jesus commits his mother to this disciple's care. According to the synoptics, the sky becomes dark at midday and the darkness lasts for three hours, until the ninth hour when Jesus cries out "Eloi, Eloi, lama sabachthani?" ("My God, my God, why have you forsaken me?"). Mark reports Jesus says "Eloi, Eloi, lama sabachthani?" in Aramaic; Matthew reports "Eli, Eli..." The centurion standing guard, who has seen how Jesus has died, declares Jesus innocent (Luke) or the "Son of God" (Matthew, Mark).

John says that, as was the custom, the soldiers come and break the legs of the thieves, so that they will die faster, but that on coming to Jesus they find him already dead. A soldier pierces his side with a spear.

According to the Gospel of Matthew, Judas, the betrayer, is filled with remorse and tries to return the money he was paid for betraying Jesus. When the high priests say that that is his affair, Judas throws the money into the temple, goes off, and hangs himself. According to the Book of Acts, Judas was not remorseful, took the money and bought a field from it, whereupon he suddenly fell and died.

== Narrative according to the Gospel of Peter ==
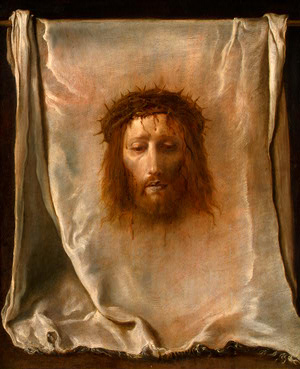
The Veil of Veronica, painting by Domenico Fetti (c. 1620).

Further claims concerning the Passion are made in some non-canonical early writings. Another passion narrative is found in the fragmentary Gospel of Peter, long known to scholars through references, and of which a fragment was discovered in Cairo in 1884.

The narrative begins with Pilate washing his hands, as in Matthew, but the Jews and Herod refuse this. Joseph of Arimathea, before Jesus has been crucified, asks for his body, and Herod says he is going to take it down to comply with the Jewish custom of not leaving a dead body hung on a tree overnight. Herod then turns Jesus over to the people who drag him, give him a purple robe, crown him with thorns, and beat and flog him.

There are also two criminals, crucified on either side of him and, as in Luke, one begs Jesus for forgiveness. The writer says Jesus is silent as they crucify him, "...as if in no pain." Jesus is labeled the King of Israel on his cross and his clothes are divided and gambled over.

As in the canonical Gospels, darkness covers the land. Jesus is also given vinegar to drink. Peter has "My Power, My Power, why have you forsaken me?" as the last words of Jesus, rather than "My God, My God, why have you forsaken me?" as quoted in Mark. He is then "taken up", possibly a euphemism for death or maybe an allusion to heaven. Peter then has a resurrection, similar to the other books.

Serapion of Antioch urged the exclusion of the Gospel of Peter from the Church because Docetists were using it to bolster their theological claims, which Serapion rejected. Many modern scholars also reject this conclusion, as the statement about Jesus being silent "as if in no pain" seems to be based on Isaiah's description of the suffering servant, "as a sheep that before its shearers is silent, so he opened not his mouth." (Isaiah 53:7).

== The trials of Jesus ==
The gospels provide differing accounts of the trial of Jesus. Mark describes two separate proceedings, one involving Jewish leaders and one in which the Roman prefect for Judea, Pontius Pilate, plays the key role. Both Matthew and John's accounts generally support Mark's two-trial version. Luke, alone among the gospels, adds yet a third proceeding: having Pilate send Jesus to Herod Antipas. The non-canonical Gospel of Peter describes a single trial scene involving Jewish, Roman, and Herodian officials.

== Biblical prophecies ==
=== Old Testament prophecy ===
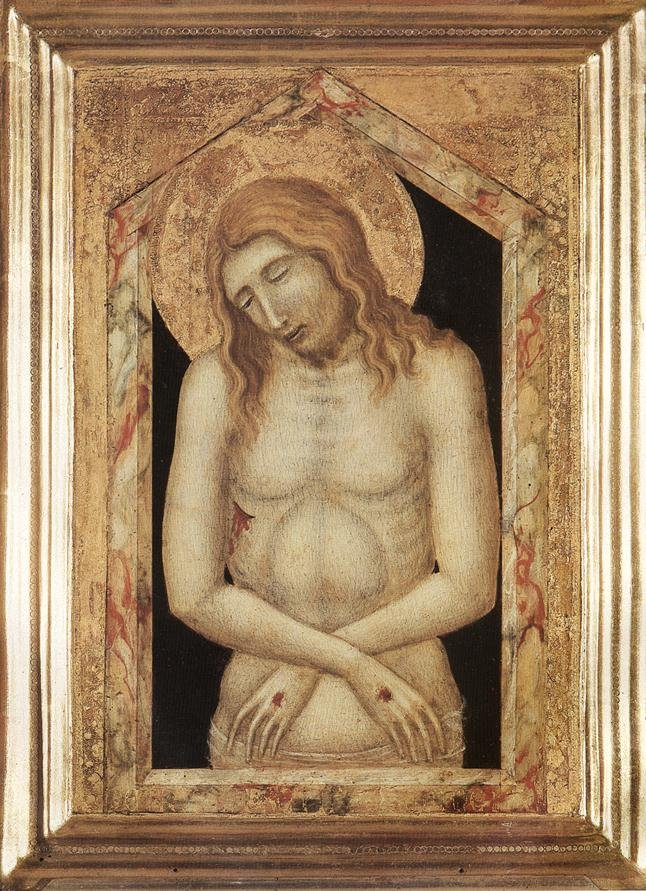
Christ as Man of Sorrows by Pietro Lorenzetti, c. 1330 (Lindenau-Museum, Altenburg)

Christians interpret at least three passages of the Old Testament as prophecies about Jesus' Passion.

The first and most obvious is the one from Isaiah 52:13–53:12 (either 8th or 6th century BC). This prophetic oracle describes a sinless man who will atone for the sins of his people. By his voluntary suffering, he will save sinners from the just punishment of God. The death of Jesus is said to fulfill this prophecy. For example, "He had no form or comeliness that we should look at him, and no beauty that we should desire him. He was despised and rejected by men; a man of sorrows, and acquainted with grief; and as one from whom men hide their faces he was despised, and we esteemed him not. Surely he has borne our griefs and carried our sorrows; yet we esteemed him stricken, smitten by God, and afflicted. But he was wounded for our transgressions, he was bruised for our iniquities; upon him was the chastisement that made us whole, and with his stripes we are healed" (53:2–5).

The second prophecy of Christ's Passion is the ancient text which Jesus himself quoted, while he was dying on the cross. From the cross, Jesus cried with a loud voice, "Eli, Eli, lema sabachthani?" which means, "My God, my God, why hast Thou forsaken me?" These words of Jesus were a quotation of the ancient HE. King David, in Psalm 22, foretold the sufferings of the messiah. For example, "I am a worm and no man, the reproach of men and the outcast of the people. All who see me, laugh me to scorn, they draw apart their lips, and wag their heads: 'He trusts in the Lord: let him free him, let him deliver him if he loves him.' Stand not far from me, for I am troubled; be thou near at hand: for I have no helper. ...Yea, dogs are round about me; a company of evildoers encircle me; they have pierced my hands and feet – I can count all my bones – they stare and gloat over me; they divide my garments among them, and for my raiment they cast lots" (Psalm 22:7–19). The words "they have pierced my hands and feet" are disputed, however.

The third main prophecy of the Passion is from the Book of the Wisdom of Solomon. Protestant Christians place it in the Apocrypha, Catholics and Eastern Orthodox among the deuterocanonical books. But it was written about 150 BC, and many have understood these verses (12–20 of chapter 2) as a direct prophecy of Jesus' Passion. For example, "Let us lie in wait for the just, because he is not for our turn. ...He boasteth that he hath the knowledge of God, and calleth himself the son of God ... and glorieth that he hath God for his father. Let us see then if his words be true. ...For if he be the true son of God, he will defend him, and will deliver him from the hands of his enemies. Let us examine him by outrages and tortures. ...Let us condemn him to a most shameful death. ...These things they thought, and were deceived, for their own malice blinded them" (Wisdom 2:12–20).

In addition to the above, it deserves to be mentioned that at least three other, less elaborate messianic prophecies were fulfilled in Jesus' crucifixion, namely, the following Old Testament passages:

"Many are the afflictions of the just man; but the Lord delivers him from all of them. He guards all his bones: not even one of them shall be broken" (Psalm 34:20).

"And they gave me gall for my food, and in my thirst they gave me vinegar to drink" (Psalm 69:21).

"And they shall look upon me whom they have pierced; and they shall mourn for him as one mourneth for an only son; and they shall grieve over him, as the manner is to grieve for the death of the firstborn" (Zechariah 12:10).

=== New Testament prophecy ===
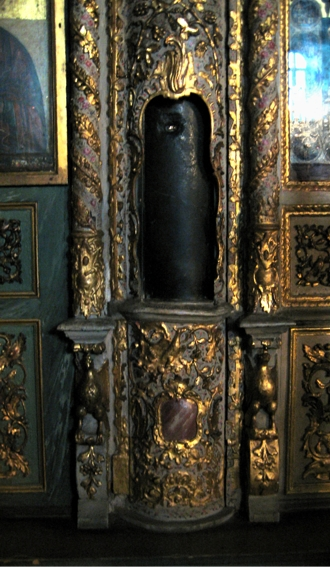
Fragment of the Pillar of the Flagellation, Hagios Georgios Patriarchal Church, Istanbul.

The Gospel explains how these old prophecies were fulfilled in Jesus' crucifixion.

"So the soldiers came and broke the legs of the first, and of the other who had been crucified with Jesus; but when they came to Jesus and saw that he was already dead, they did not break his legs. But one of the soldiers pierced his side with a spear, and at once there came out blood and water. ...For these things took place that the scripture might be fulfilled, 'Not a bone of him shall be broken.' And again another scripture says, 'They shall look on him whom they have pierced'" (John 19:32–37).

In the Gospel of Mark, Jesus is described as prophesying his own Passion and his Resurrection three times:

- On the way to Caesarea Philippi, predicting that the Son of Man will be killed and rise within three days.
- After the transfiguration of Jesus, again predicting that the Son of Man will be killed and rise within three days.
- On the way to Jerusalem, predicting that the Son of Man will be delivered to the leading Pharisees and Sadducees, be condemned to death, delivered to the Gentiles, mocked, scourged, killed, and rise within three days.

Christians argue that these are cases of genuine and fulfilled prophecy and many scholars see Semitic features and tradition in Mark 9:31.

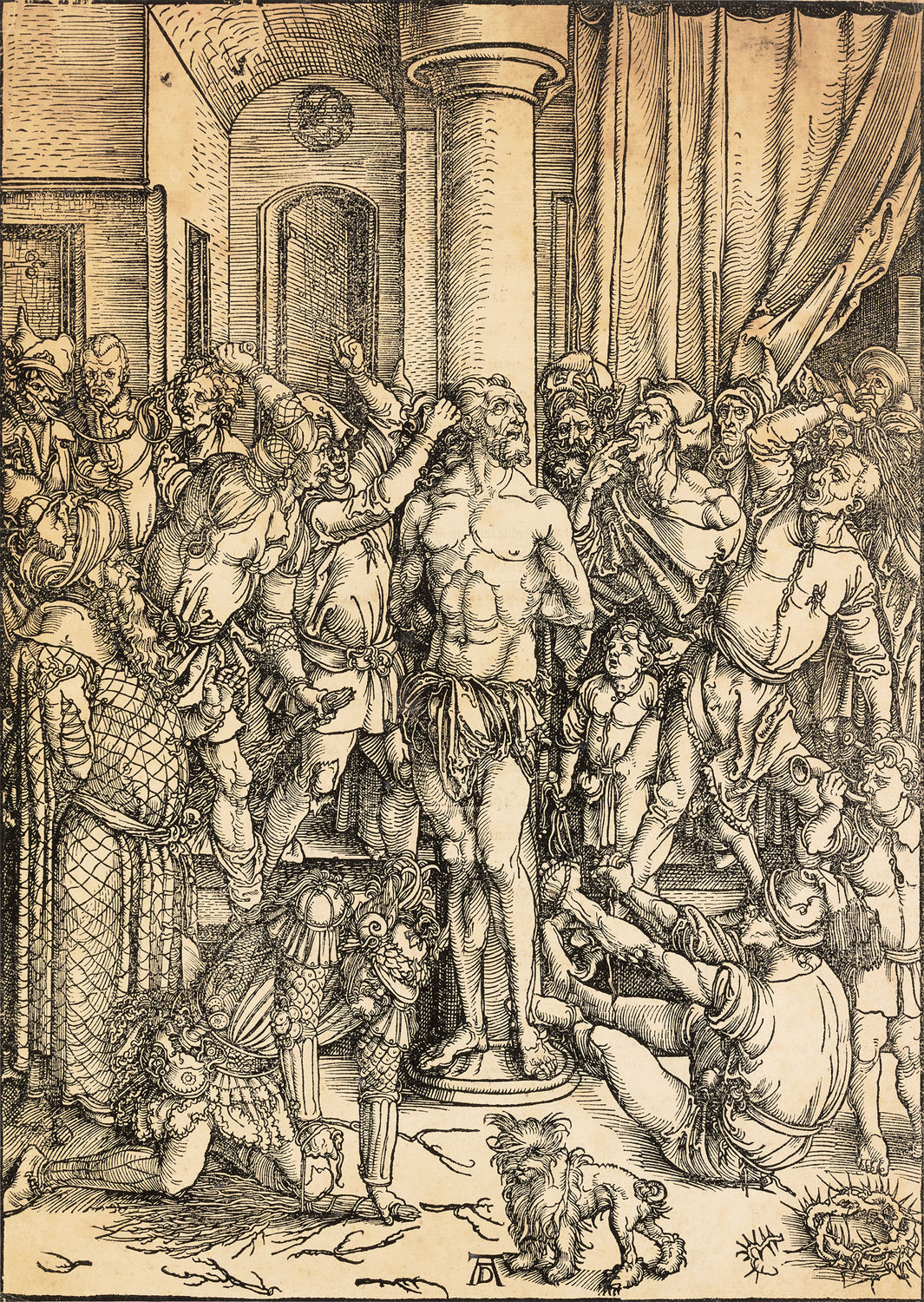
Albrecht Dürer, The Scourging of Christ, circa 1511.

After the third prophecy, the Gospel of Mark states that the brothers James and John ask Jesus to be his left and right hand men, but Jesus asks if they can drink from the "cup" he must drink from. They say that they can do this. Jesus confirms this, but says that the places at his right and left hand are reserved for others. Many Christian see this as being a reference to the two criminals at Jesus's crucifixion, thus relating to the Passion. The "cup" is sometimes interpreted as the symbol of his death, in the light of Jesus's prayer at Gethsemane "Let this cup be taken from me!"

== Liturgical use ==
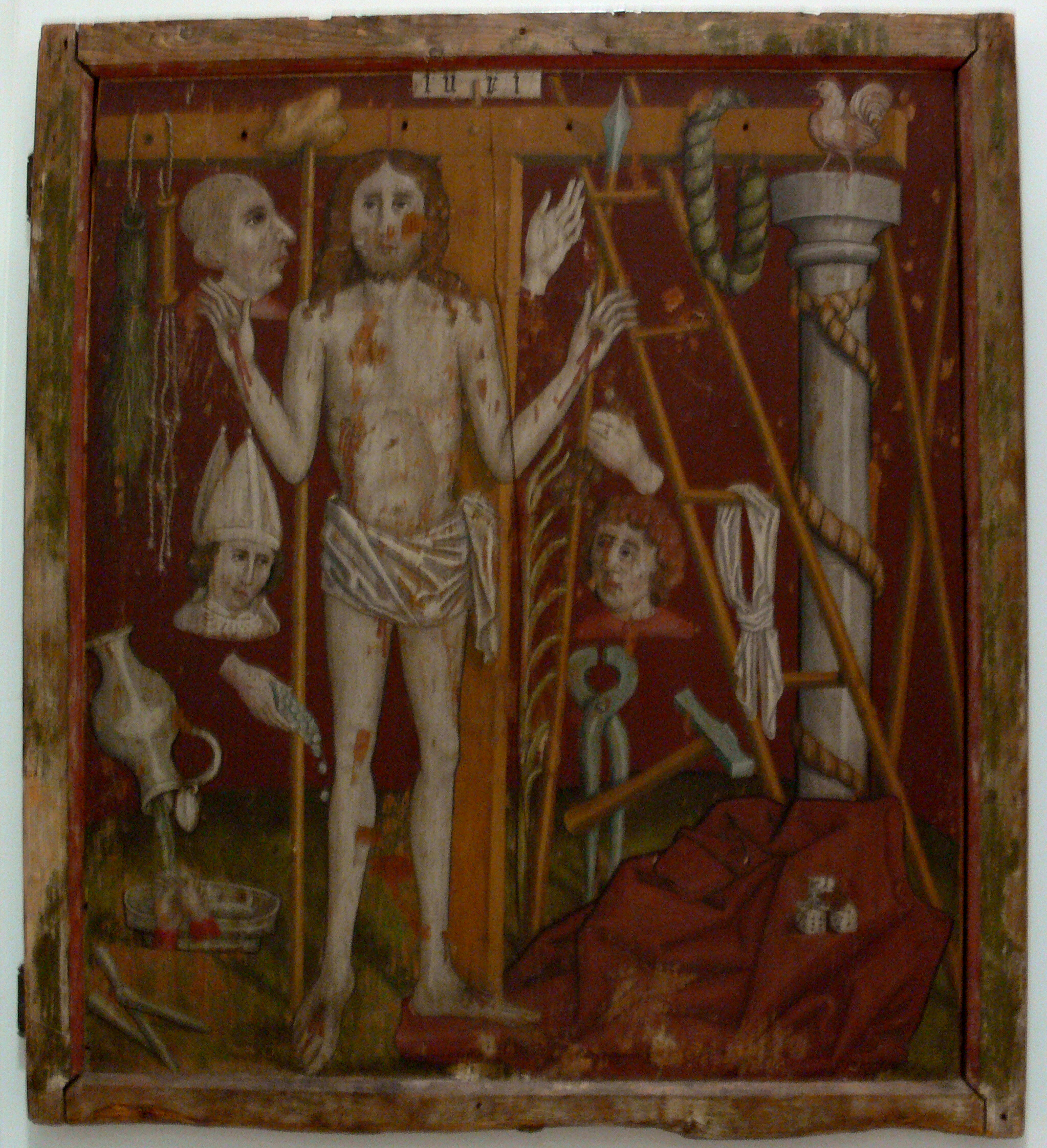
The Arma Christi on the back of an Austrian altarpiece of 1468.

Most Christian denominations will read one or more narratives of the Passion during Holy Week, especially on Good Friday. In the Roman Rite of the Catholic Church, a large cross depicting the crucified Christ is brought out into the church and each of the faithful come forward to venerate the cross. Rather than having the Gospel read solely by the priest, whole congregations participate in the reading of the Passion Gospel during the Palm Sunday Mass and the Good Friday service. These readings have the Priest read the part of Christ, a narrator read the narrative, other reader(s) reading the other speaking parts, and either the choir or the congregation reading the parts of crowds (i.e.: when the crowd shouts "Crucify Him! Crucify Him!").

In the Byzantine Rite of the Eastern Orthodox and Greek-Catholic Churches, the Matins service for Good Friday is called Matins of the Twelve Passion Gospels, and is notable for the interspersal of twelve readings from the Gospel Book detailing chronologically the events of the Passion – from the Last Supper to the burial in the tomb – during the course of the service. The first of these twelve readings is the longest Gospel reading of the entire liturgical year. In addition, every Wednesday and Friday throughout the year is dedicated in part to the commemoration of the Passion.

During Holy Week/Passion Week Congregations of the Moravian Church (Herrnhuter Bruedergemeine) read the entire story of Jesus's final week from a Harmony of the Gospels prepared for that purpose since 1777. Daily meetings are held, some times two or three times a day, to follow the events of the day. During the course of the reading, the Congregation sings hymn verses to respond to the events of the text.

Most liturgical churches hold some form of commemoration of the Crucifixion on the afternoon of Good Friday. Sometimes, this will take the form of a vigil from noon to 3:00 pm, the approximate time that Jesus hung on the cross. Sometimes there will be a reenactment of the Descent from the Cross; for instance, at Vespers in the Byzantine (Eastern Orthodox and Greek-Catholic) tradition.

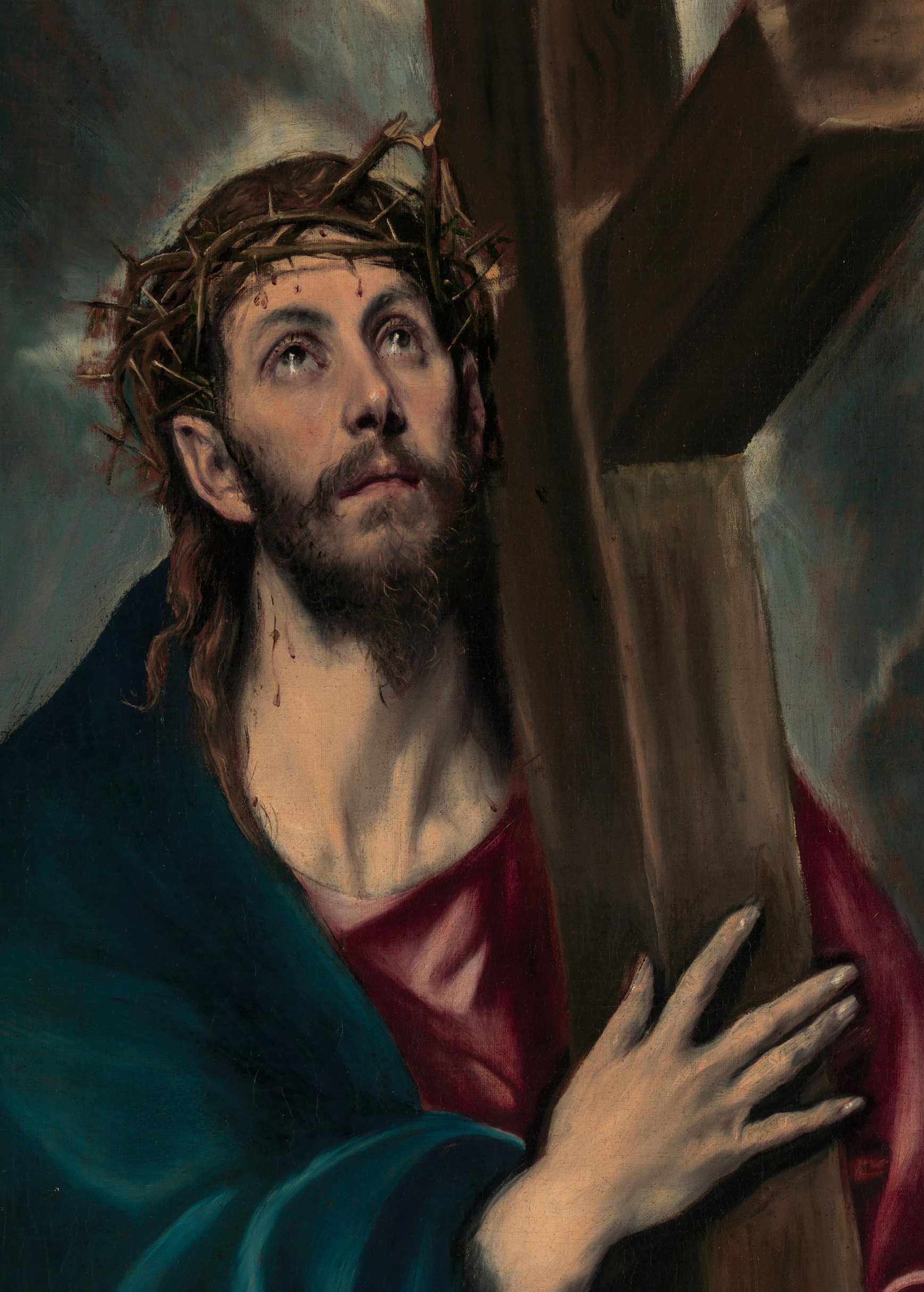
El Greco's Jesus Carrying the Cross, 1580.

== Devotions ==
Several non-liturgical devotions have been developed by Christian faithful to commemorate the Passion.

=== The Stations of the Cross ===
The Stations of the Cross are a series of religious reflections describing or depicting Christ carrying the cross to his crucifixion. Most Catholic churches, as well as many Anglican, Lutheran, and Methodist parishes, contain Stations of the Cross, typically placed at intervals along the sidewalls of the nave; in most churches, they are small plaques with reliefs or paintings, although in others they may be simple crosses with a numeral in the center. The tradition of moving around the Stations to commemorate the Passion of Christ began with Francis of Assisi and extended throughout the Catholic Church in the medieval period. It is most commonly done during Lent, especially on Good Friday, but it can be done on other days as well, especially Wednesdays and Fridays.

=== The Passion Offices ===
The Passion Offices were the special prayers said by various Catholic communities, particularly the Passionist fathers to commemorate the Passion of Christ.

=== The Little Office of the Passion ===
Another devotion is the Little Office of the Passion created by Francis of Assisi (1181/82–1226). He ordered this office around the medieval association of five specific moments in Jesus's Passion with specific hours of the day. Having then attributed these to hours of the Divine Office, he arrived at this schema:

- Compline – 21:00 – Jesus's Arrest on the Mount of Olives
- Matins – 00:00 – Jesus's Trial before the Jewish Sanhedrin
- Prime – 06:00 – "an interlude celebrating Christ as the light of the new day"
- Terce – 09:00 – Jesus's Trial before Pontius Pilate
- Sext – 12:00 – Jesus's Crucifixion
- None – 15:00 – Jesus's Death
- Vespers – 18:00 – "recalling and celebrating the entire daily cycle"

=== Acts of reparation ===
The Catholic tradition includes specific prayers and devotions as "acts of reparation" for the sufferings and insults that Jesus endured during his Passion. These "acts of reparation to Jesus Christ" do not involve a petition for a living or deceased beneficiary, but aim to repair the sins against Jesus. Some such prayers are provided in the Raccolta Catholic prayer book (approved by a Decree of 1854, and published by the Holy See in 1898) which also includes prayers as Acts of Reparation to the Virgin Mary.

In his encyclical on reparations, Miserentissimus Redemptor, Pope Pius XI called acts of reparation to Jesus Christ a duty for Catholics and referred to them as "some sort of compensation to be rendered for the injury" with respect to the sufferings of Jesus.

Pope John Paul II referred to acts of reparation as the "unceasing effort to stand beside the endless crosses on which the Son of God continues to be crucified".

== In the arts ==
=== Visual art ===
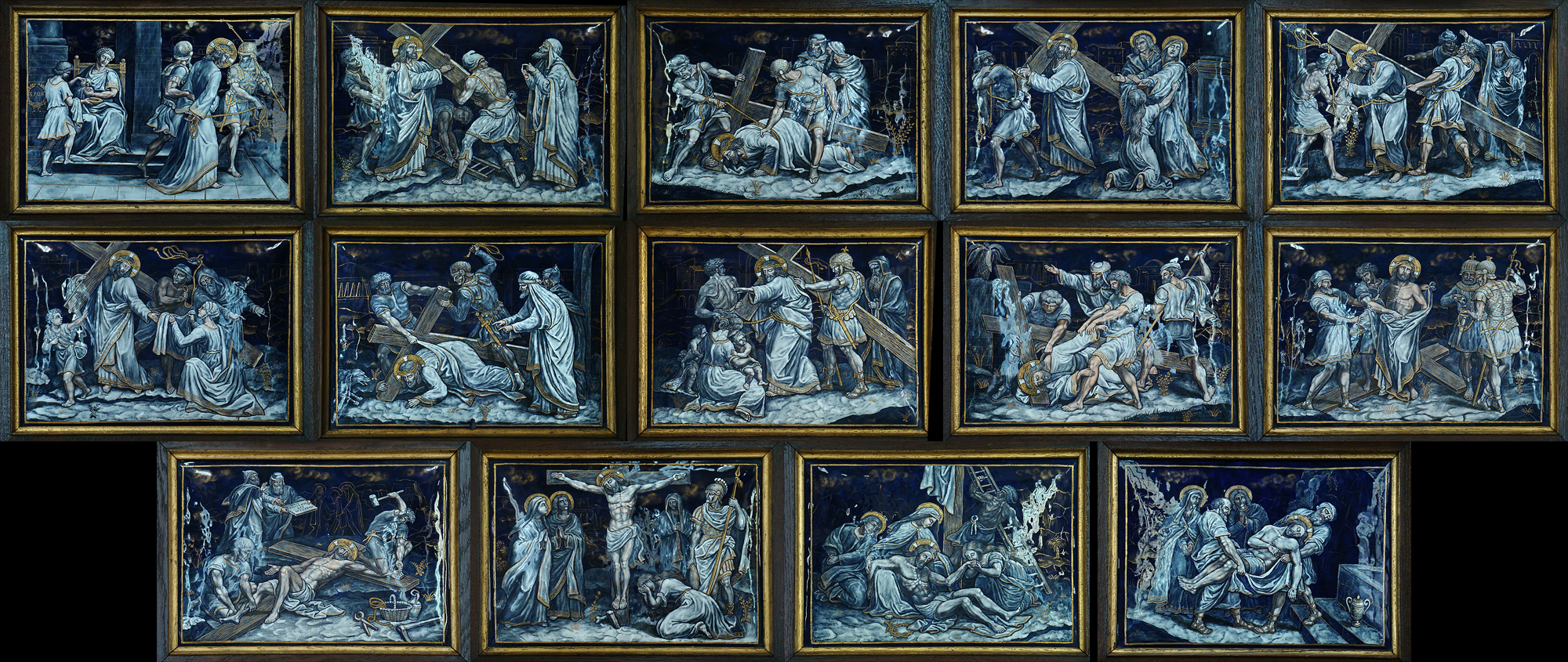
A set of the Stations of the Cross in painted enamel.

Each episode of the Passion, such as the Flagellation of Christ or Entombment of Christ, has been represented thousands of times and has developed its own iconographic tradition; the Crucifixion is much the most common and important of these subjects. The Passion is often covered by a cycle of depictions; Albrecht Dürer's print cycles were so popular that he produced three different versions. Andachtsbilder is a term for devotional subjects such as the Man of Sorrows or Pietà, that may not precisely represent a moment in the Passion but are derived from the Passion story.

The Arma Christi, or "Instruments of the Passion" are the objects associated with Jesus's Passion, such as the cross, the Crown of Thorns and the Spear of Longinus. Each of the major Instruments has been supposedly recovered as relics which have been an object of veneration among many Christians, and have been depicted in art. Veronica's Veil is also often counted among the Instruments of the Passion; like the Shroud of Turin and Sudarium of Oviedo it is a cloth relic supposed to have touched Jesus.

In the Catholic Church, the Passion story is depicted in the Stations of the Cross (via crucis, also translated more literally as 'Way of the Cross'). These 14 stations depict the Passion from the sentencing by Pilate to the sealing of the tomb, or with the addition of a 15th, the resurrection. Since the 16th-century representations of them in various media have decorated the naves of most Catholic churches. The Way of the Cross is a devotion practiced by many people on Fridays throughout the year, most importantly on Good Friday. This may be simply by going round the Stations in a church, or may involve large-scale re-enactments, as in Jerusalem. The Sacri Monti of Piedmont and Lombardy are similar schemes on a far larger scale than church Stations, with chapels containing large sculpted groups arranged in a hilly landscape; for pilgrims to tour the chapels typically takes several hours. They mostly date from the late 16th to the 17th century; most depict the Passion, others different subjects as well.

=== Music ===
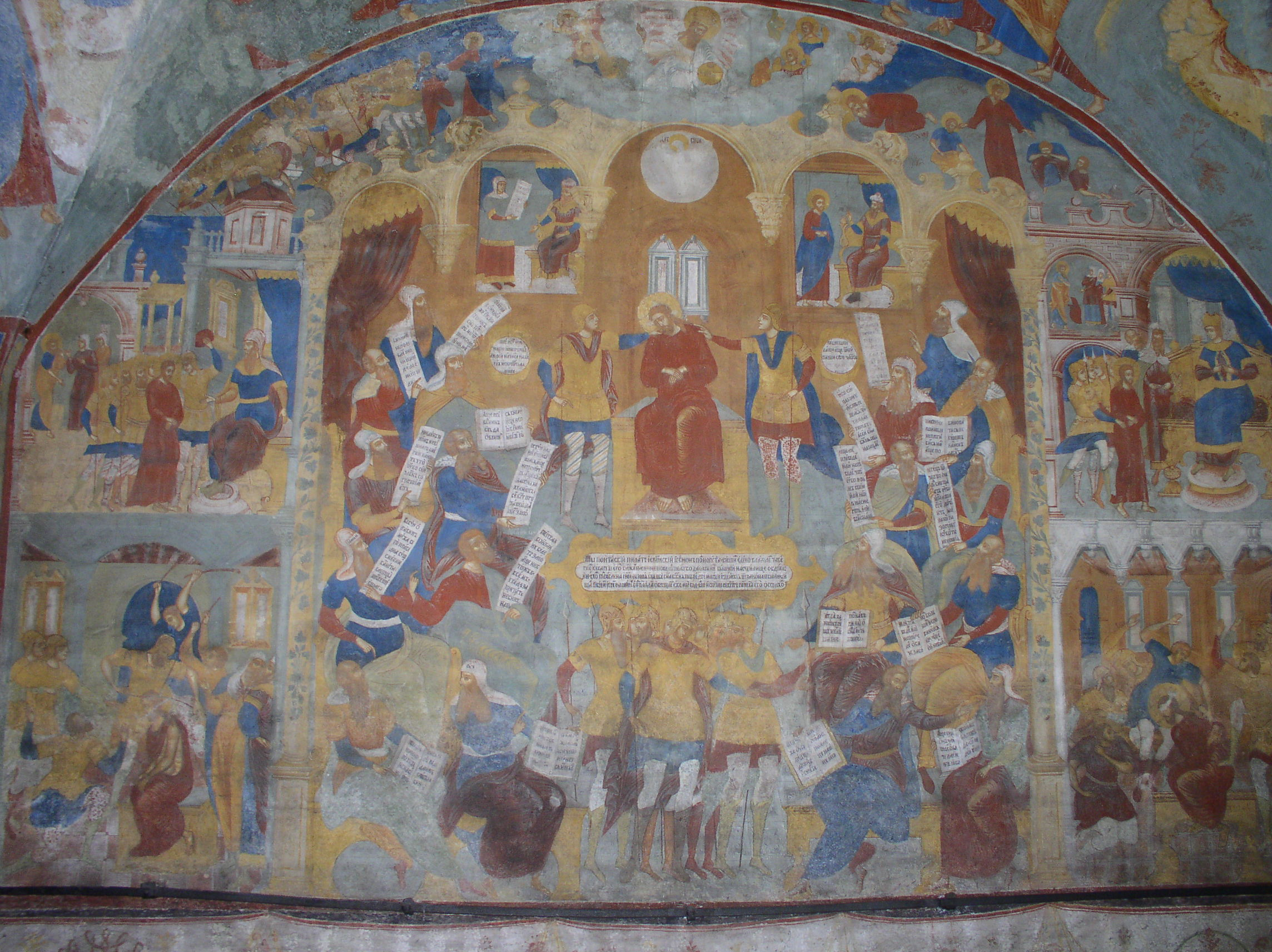
Fresco depicting the trial and beating of Jesus (17th century, St. John the Baptist Church, Yaroslavl, Russia).

The main traditional types of church music sung during Holy Week are Passions, musical settings of the Gospel narratives, both a Catholic and Lutheran tradition, and settings of the readings and responses from the Catholic Tenebrae services, especially those of the Lamentations of Jeremiah the Prophet. The many settings of the Stabat Mater or musical settings of sayings of Jesus on the cross are also commonly performed.

The reading of the Passion section of one of the Gospels during Holy Week dates back to the 4th century. It began to be intoned (rather than just spoken) in the Middle Ages, at least as early as the 8th century. 9th-century manuscripts have litterae significativae indicating interpretive chant, and later manuscripts begin to specify exact notes to be sung. By the 13th century, different singers were used for different characters in the narrative, a practice which became fairly universal by the 15th century, when polyphonic settings of the turba passages began to appear also. (Turba, while literally meaning 'crowd', is used in this case to mean any passage in which more than one person speaks simultaneously.)

In the later 15th century a number of new styles began to emerge:

- Responsorial Passions set all of Christ's words and the turba parts polyphonically.
- Through-composed Passions were entirely polyphonic (also called motet Passions). Jacob Obrecht wrote the earliest extant example of this type.
- Summa Passionis settings were a synopsis of all four Gospels, including the Seven Last Words (a text later set by Haydn and Théodore Dubois). These were discouraged for church use but circulated widely nonetheless.

In the 16th century, settings like these, and further developments, were created for the Catholic Church by Tomás Luis de Victoria, William Byrd, Jacobus Gallus, Francisco Guerrero, Orlando di Lasso, and Cipriano de Rore.

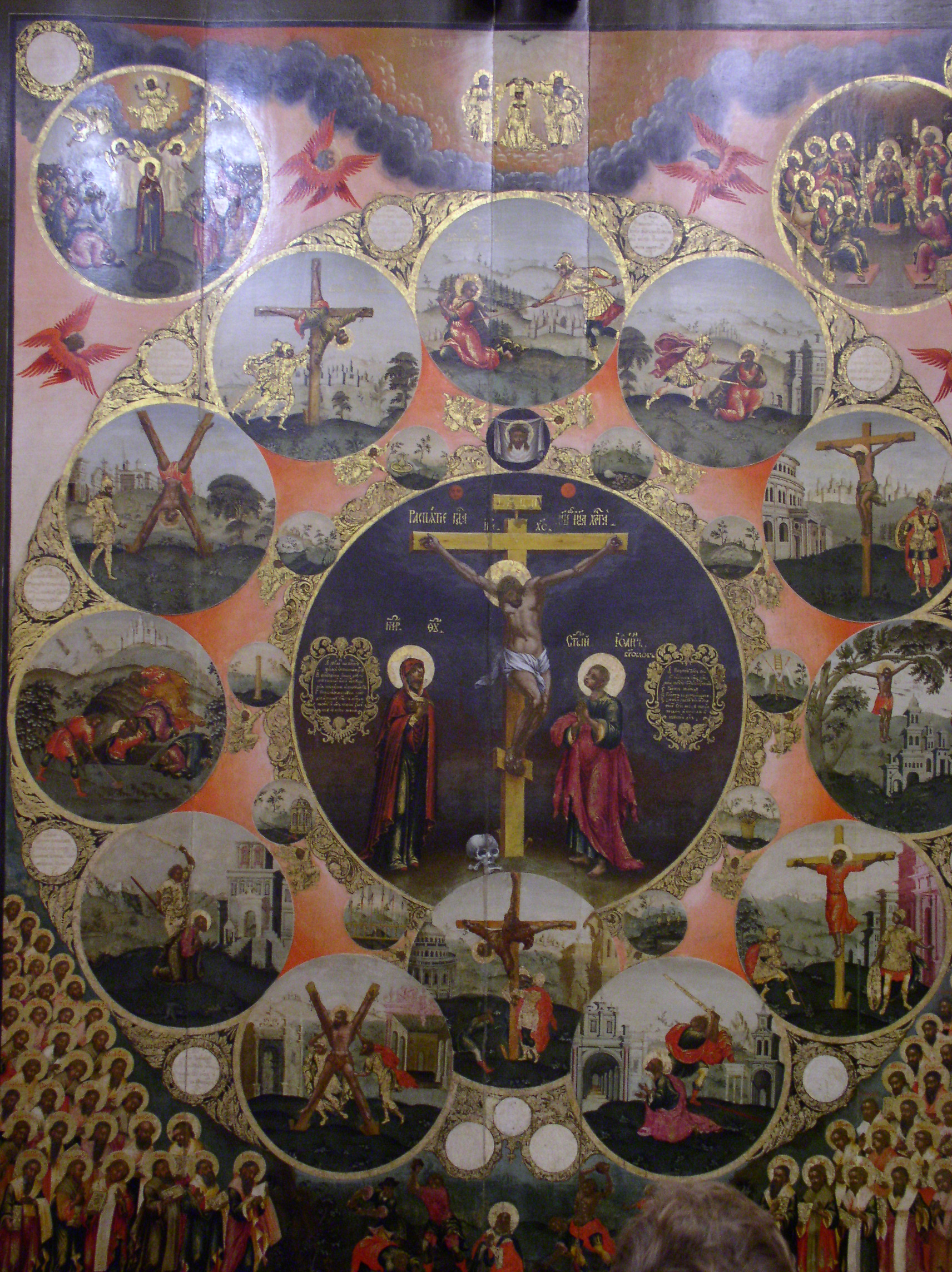
Russian Orthodox icon of the Passion with scenes of the martyrdom of the Twelve Apostles, symbolizing how all are called to enter into the Passion (Moscow Kremlin).

Martin Luther wrote, "The Passion of Christ should not be acted out in words and pretense, but in real life." Despite this, sung Passion performances were common in Lutheran churches right from the start, in both Latin and German, beginning as early as Laetare Sunday (three weeks before Easter) and continuing through Holy Week. Luther's friend and collaborator Johann Walther wrote responsorial Passions which were used as models by Lutheran composers for centuries, and summa Passionis versions continued to circulate, despite Luther's express disapproval.

Later 16th-century passions included choral exordium (introduction) and conclusio sections with additional texts. In the 17th century came the development of oratorio passions which led to Johann Sebastian Bach's Passions, accompanied by instruments, with interpolated texts (then called "madrigal" movements) such as sinfonias, other Scripture passages, Latin motets, chorale arias, and more. Such settings were created by Bartholomäus Gesius and Heinrich Schütz. Thomas Strutz wrote a Passion (1664) with arias for Jesus himself, pointing to the standard oratorio tradition of Schütz, Giacomo Carissimi, and others, although these composers seem to have thought that putting words in Jesus' mouth was beyond the pale. The practice of using recitative for the Evangelist (rather than plainsong) was a development of court composers in northern Germany and only crept into church compositions at the end of the 17th century. A famous musical reflection on the Passion is Part II of Messiah, an oratorio by George Frideric Handel, though the text here draws from Old Testament prophecies rather than from the gospels themselves.

The best known Protestant musical settings of the Passion are by Bach, who wrote several Passions, of which two have survived completely, one based on the Gospel of John (the St John Passion), the other on the Gospel of Matthew (the St Matthew Passion). His St Mark Passion was reconstructed in various ways. The Passion continued to be very popular in Protestant Germany in the 18th century, with Bach's second son, Carl Philipp Emanuel, composing over twenty settings. Gottfried August Homilius composed at least one cantata Passion and four oratorio Passions after all four Evangelists. Many of C. P. E. Bachs performances were in fact works by Homilius.

In the 19th century, with the exception of John Stainer's The Crucifixion (1887), Passion settings were less popular, but in the 20th century they have again come into fashion. Two notable settings are the St. Luke Passion (1965) by the composer Krzysztof Penderecki and the Passio (1982) by the composer Arvo Pärt. Recent examples include The Passion According to St. Matthew (1997), by Mark Alburger, and The Passion According to the Four Evangelists, by Scott King. The theatre composer Andrew Lloyd Webber's Jesus Christ Superstar (book and lyrics by Tim Rice) and the theatre composer Stephen Schwartz's Godspell both contain elements of the traditional passion accounts. Sofia Gubaidulina composed a Johannes-Passion, commissioned to commemorate Bach in Stuttgart in 2000, for which she combined the Gospel of John with texts from the Book of Revelation.

Choral meditations on aspects of the suffering of Jesus on the cross include arrangements such as Buxtehude's Membra Jesu Nostri, a 1680 set of seven Passion cantatas, and the first such Lutheran treatment, incorporating lyrics excerpted from a medieval Latin poem and featuring Old Testament verses that prefigure the Messiah as suffering servant.

=== Drama and processions ===
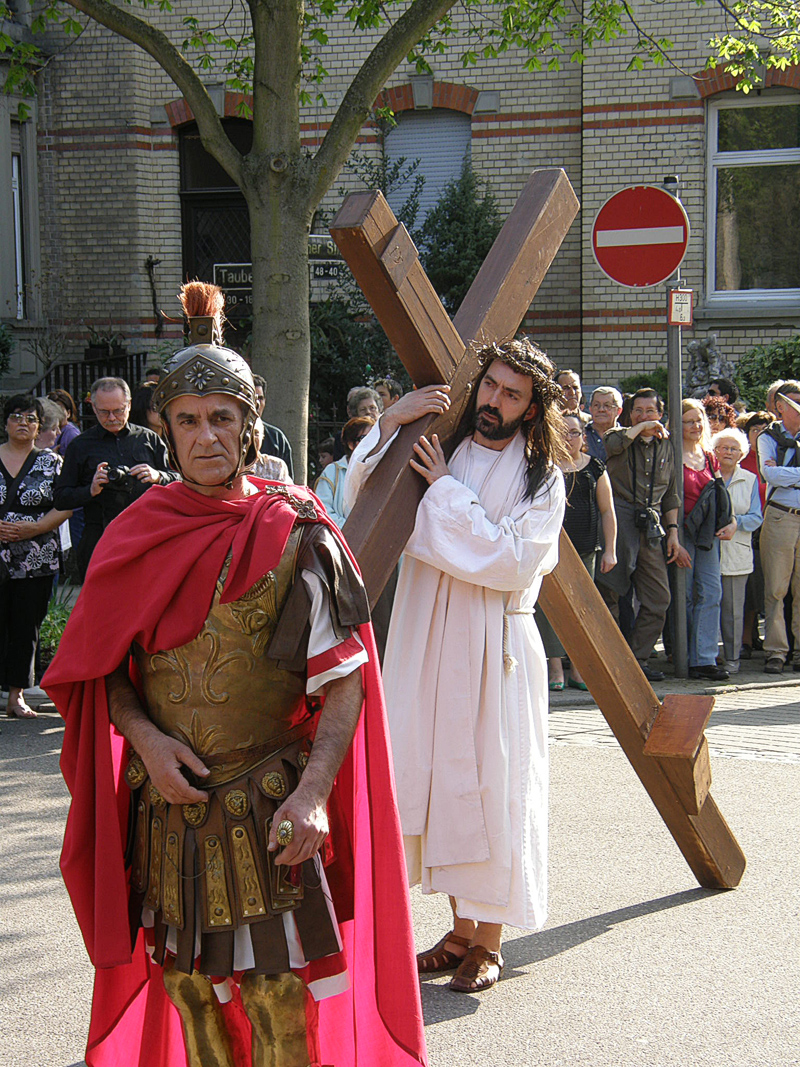
Christian Easter passion procession in Stuttgart, Germany

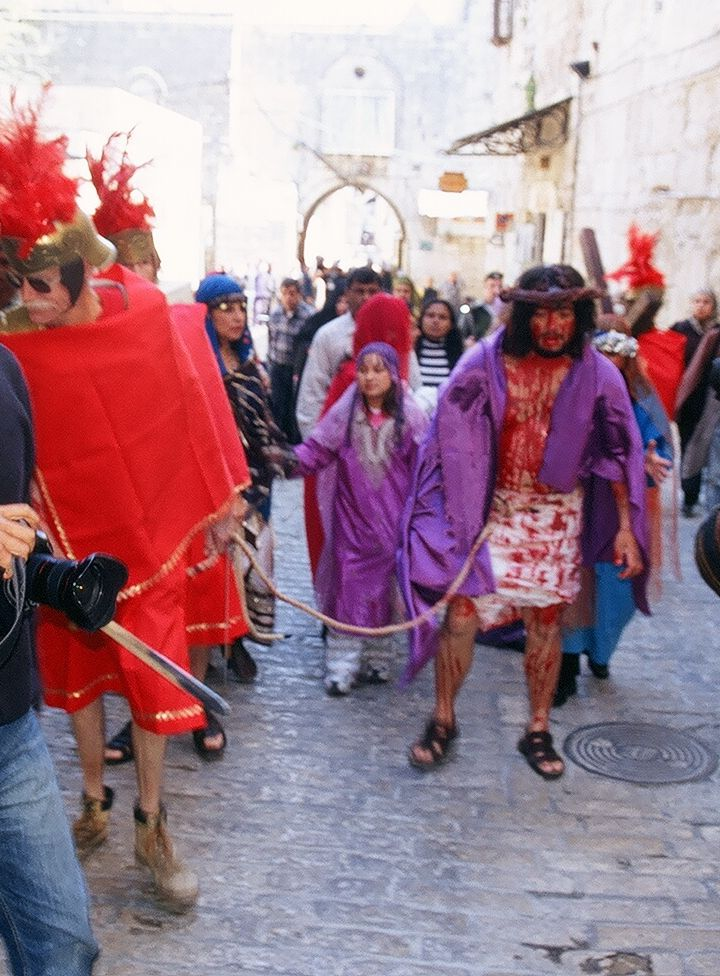
Reenacting the Stations of the Cross in Jerusalem on the Via Dolorosa from the Lions' Gate to the Church of the Holy Sepulchre.

Non-musical settings of the Passion story are generally called Passion plays; these have been very widely performed in traditionally Catholic countries, often in churches as liturgical dramas. One famous cycle is performed at intervals at Oberammergau, Germany, another in Sordevolo one of the most important in Italy, and another in the Brazilian state of Pernambuco uses what is considered the largest open-air theater in the world. The Passion figures among the scenes in the English mystery plays in more than one cycle of dramatic vignettes. In the Chester Mystery Plays' portrayal of Christ's Passion, specifically his humiliation before his sentence to crucifixion, the accounts of the Gospels concerning the physical violence visited on Jesus during his trial before the Sanhedrin, and the humiliating crowning of thorns visited upon him in Pilate's palace (or by Herod's soldiers, according to Luke), is further confused by showing both actions as being carried out by jeering Jews.

Processions on Palm Sunday commonly re-enact to some degree the entry of Jesus to Jerusalem, traditional ones often using special wooden donkeys on wheels. Holy Week in Spain retains more traditional public processions than other countries, with the most famous, in Seville, featuring floats with carved tableaux showing scenes from the story.

==== In Latin America ====
During the Passion week many towns in Mexico have a representation of the passion.

==== In Spain ====
During the Passion week many cities and towns in Spain have a representation of the Passion.

Many Passion poems and prose text circulated in the 15th-century Castile, among which there were the first modern translations of earlier Latin Passion texts and Vitae Christi, and also a popular Monotessaron or Pasión de l'eterno principe Jesucristo attributed to a pseudo-Gerson. It was most likely written by Thomas à Kempis, whose Imitation of Christ mentions the Passion a few times, uniquely when talking about the Eucharist.

=== Film ===
There have also been a number of films telling the passion story, with a prominent example being Mel Gibson's 2004 The Passion of the Christ.

== Other traditions ==
- The sons of Simon of Cyrene are named as if they might have been early Christian figures known to Mark's intended audience. Paul also lists a Rufus in Romans 16:13.
- Most garments of the region were made of woven strips of material that were about eight inches wide and included decorative braids from two to four inches (102 mm) wide. The garments could be disassembled and the strips of cloth were frequently recycled. A single garment might hold sections of many different dates. However, in Damascus and Bethlehem cloth was woven on wider looms, some Damascene being 40 inches (1,000 mm) wide. Traditional Bethlehem cloth is striped like pajama material. It would thus appear that Jesus's "seamless robe" was made of cloth from either Bethlehem or Damascus.
- A tradition linked to icons of Jesus holds that Veronica was a pious woman of Jerusalem who then gave her kerchief to him to wipe his forehead. When he handed it back to her, the image of his face was miraculously impressed upon it.

== Passion of Jesus in botany ==
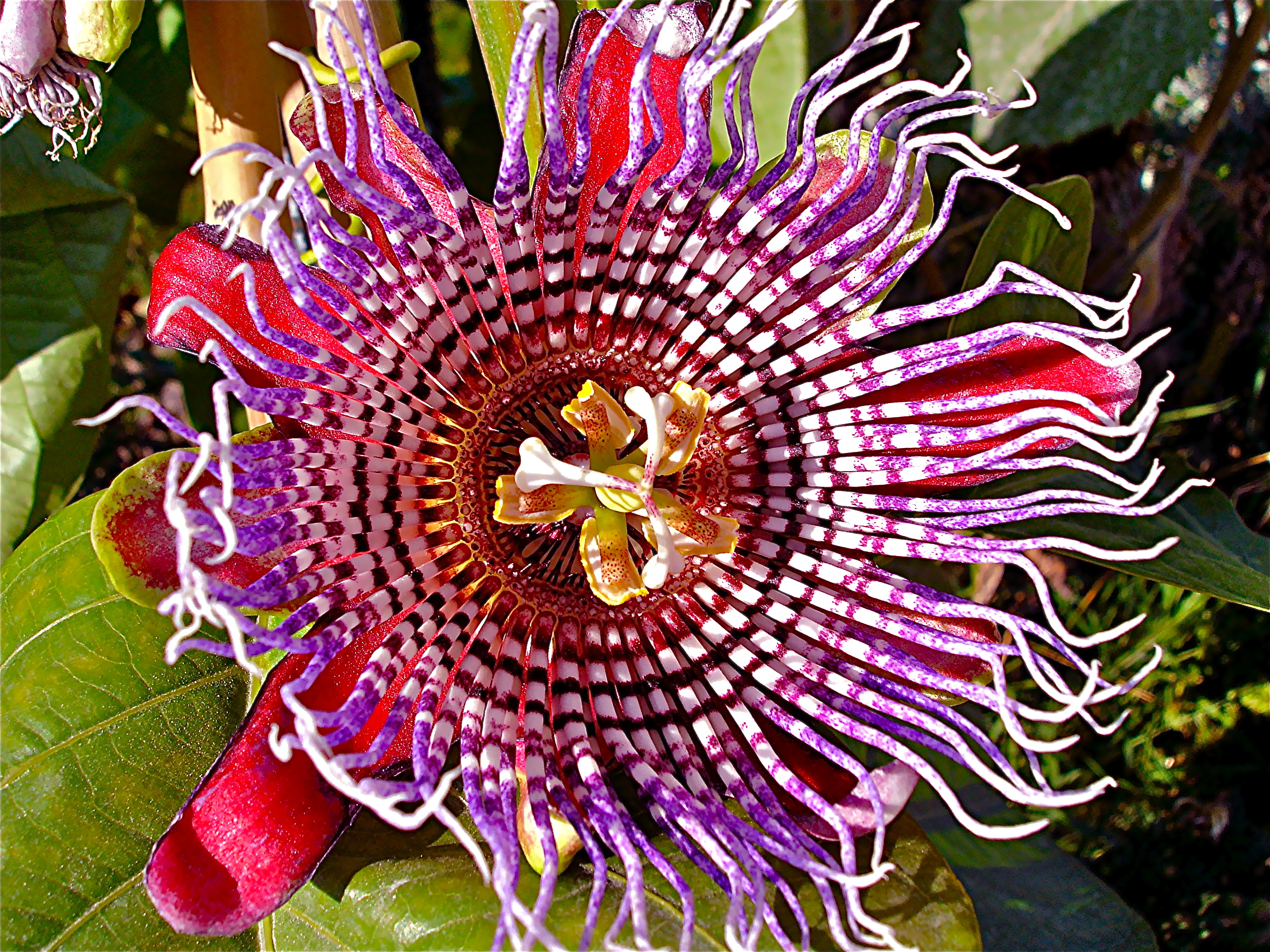
Passiflora

The tropical plant passiflora, introduced to Europe in the 16th century, got its name from the Jesuit F. B. Ferrari, who saw in its flower an emblem containing the instruments of the Passion of Christ. The three stigmas represent three nails; a circle of radial filaments invokes images of a bloody crown of thorns; a stalk fruit grower signifies the Holy Grail; five anthers correspond to five wounds of the Savior; a three-bladed leaf is indicative of Holy Lance; the tendrils symbolize the whips used in the flagellation of Christ, with the attachments (antennae) signifying lashes and the white color embodying the Savior's innocence.

== See also ==
- Acts of Reparation to Jesus Christ
- Christian tragedy
- Instruments of the Passion
- Jesus at Herod's court
- Life of Jesus in the New Testament
- Passion cantata
- Sacri Monti of Piedmont and Lombardy
