= First Thursdays Devotion =

Catholic devotion

The First Thursdays Devotion, also called the Act of Reparation to the Wounds of Jesus and to the Holy Eucharist, is a Catholic devotion to offer acts of reparation.

== Oratio Sancti Caietani ==
There was already at this time a long-standing first Thursdays devotion that involved praying the Respice, Domine ("Look down, O Lord"), a prayer attributed to Saint Cajetan. (Note: Look down, O Lord, from Thy sanctuary, from Thy dwelling in heaven on high, and behold this sacred Victim which our great High Priest, Thy holy Son our Lord Jesus Christ, offers up to Thee for the sins of His brethren and be appeased despite the multitude of our transgressions. Behold, the voice of the Blood of Jesus, our Brother, cries to Thee from the cross. Give ear, O Lord. Be appeased, O Lord. Hearken and do not delay for Thine own sake, O my God; for Thy Name is invoked upon this city and upon Thy people and deal with us according to Thy mercy. Amen. That Thou wouldst defend, pacify, keep, preserve, and bless this city, we beseech Thee, hear us.) The prayer was to be said while kneeling before the Blessed Sacrament. A plenary indulgence was granted for the first Thursday in each month to all who would say it after confession and communion and pray for the needs of the Church. Partial indulgences were granted for saying the prayer at other times. Cajetan's prayer echoes Psalm 120, and was popular as a plea for help and protection in times of trouble.

== Margaret Mary Alacoque ==
Eucharistic adoration during a "Holy hour" on Thursdays was part of the revelations reported by Margaret Mary Alacoque. In 1796, Pope Pius VI granted a plenary indulgence for those who would visit the Blessed Sacrament on the first Thursday of the month. Picpus Father Mateo Crawley-Boevey (1875-1960) promoted an at-home Holy Hour for those who couldn't make it to an oratory or chapel.

== Alexandrina of Balazar ==
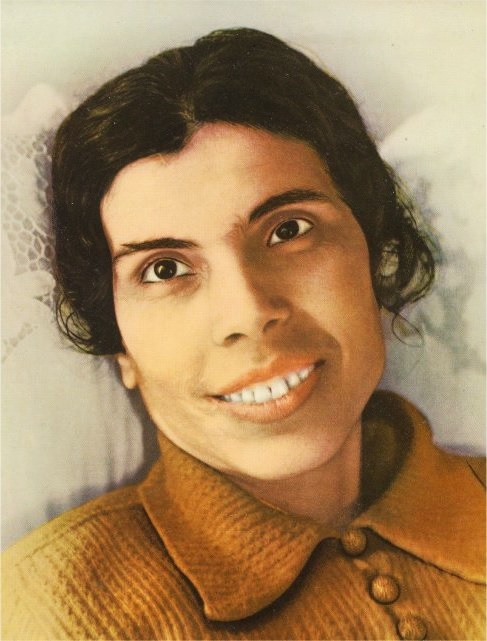
Blessed Alexandrina of Balazar

According to the Portuguese mystic Alexandrina Maria da Costa, popularly known as Blessed Alexandrina of Balazar, she experienced an apparition of Jesus on 25 February 1949, during which he requested a new devotion in reparation for his Holy Wounds, to be practiced on the first Thursday of six consecutive months. The number six represents Jesus' five wounds of the Crucifixion (hands, feet, and side) plus his shoulder wound from carrying the cross. On these days, a person is to attend the Mass and receive the Eucharist in a state of grace "with sincere humility, fervor and love" and spend one hour before a church tabernacle containing the Eucharist, meditating on the wounds of Jesus (particularly his shoulder wound) and the sorrows of Mary. This devotion to the Holy Wounds through Eucharistic adoration was approved by the Roman Catholic Church.

The Salvatorians initiated a First Thursday devotion for sanctification of the priesthood.

== See also ==
- First Fridays Devotion
- First Saturdays Devotion
- Shoulder wound of Jesus
- Seven Sorrows of Mary
