= Acts of Reparation to the Virgin Mary =

Specific prayers and devotions in Catholic tradition

Catholic tradition and Mariology include specific prayers and devotions as acts of reparation for insults and blasphemies against Mary, mother of Jesus, often known as the Blessed Virgin Mary to Catholics. Similar prayers as Acts of Reparation to Jesus Christ and Acts of Reparation to The Holy Trinity also exist.

Some such prayers are provided in the Raccolta Catholic prayer book, first published in association with the Catholic Congregation for Indulgences in 1807.

Additionally, the Five First Saturdays, also called the Act of Reparation to the Immaculate Heart of the Blessed Virgin Mary, is a Catholic devotion which, according to Sister Lúcia of Fátima, was requested by the Virgin Mary herself in an apparition at Pontevedra, Spain, in December 1925. This act of reparation has been approved by the Roman Catholic Church.

== In Reparation for Insults Offered to the Blessed Virgin Mary ==
Words of the prayer from Raccolta:

O blessed Virgin, Mother of God, look down in mercy from Heaven, where thou art enthroned as Queen, upon me, a miserable sinner, thine unworthy servant. Although I know full well my own unworthiness, yet in order to atone for the offenses that are done to thee by impious and blasphemous tongues, from the depths of my heart I praise and extol thee as the purest, the fairest, the holiest creature of all God's handiwork. I bless thy holy Name, I praise thine exalted privilege of being truly Mother of God, ever Virgin, conceived without stain of sin, Co-Redemptrix of the human race. I bless the Eternal Father who chose thee in an especial way for His daughter; I bless the Word Incarnate who took upon Himself our nature in thy bosom and so made thee His Mother; I bless the Holy Spirit who took thee as His bride. All honor, praise and thanksgiving to the ever-blessed Trinity who predestined thee and loved thee so exceedingly from all eternity as to exalt thee above all creatures to the most sublime heights. O Virgin, holy and merciful, obtain for all who offend thee the grace of repentance, and graciously accept this poor act of homage from me thy servant, obtaining likewise for me from thy divine Son the pardon and remission of all my sins. Amen.

== An Act of Reparation for Blasphemies Against the Blessed Virgin Mary ==
Words of the prayer from Raccolta:

Most glorious Virgin Mary, Mother of God and our Mother, turn thine eyes in pity upon us, miserable sinners; we are sore afflicted by the many evils that surround us in this life, but especially do we feel our hearts break within us upon hearing the dreadful insults and blasphemies uttered against thee, O Virgin Immaculate. O how these impious sayings offend the infinite Majesty of God and of His only-begotten Son, Jesus Christ! How they provoke His indignation and give us cause to fear the terrible effects of His vengeance! Would that the sacrifice of our lives might avail to put an end to such outrages and blasphemies; were it so, how gladly we should make it, for we desire, O most holy Mother, to love thee and to honor thee with all our hearts, since this is the will of God. And just because we love thee, we will do all that is in our power to make thee honored and loved by all men. In the meantime do thou, our merciful Mother, the supreme comforter of the afflicted, accept this our act of reparation which we offer thee for ourselves and for all our families, as well as for all who impiously blaspheme thee, not knowing what they say. Do thou obtain for them from Almighty God the grace of conversion, and thus render more manifest and more glorious thy kindness, thy power and thy great mercy. May they join with us in proclaiming thee blessed among women, the Immaculate Virgin and most compassionate Mother of God. [Say three Hail Marys]

— Raccolta, 1950

== See also ==
- Acts of Reparation
- Acts of Reparation to Jesus Christ
- Acts of Reparation to The Holy Trinity
- Mother of God (Roman Catholic)
- The Golden Arrow Holy Face Devotion (Prayer)
