= Indulgentiarum Doctrina =

1967 apostolic constitution by Pope Paul VI

Indulgentiarum Doctrina is an apostolic constitution about indulgences issued by Pope Paul VI on 1 January 1967. It responds to suggestions made at the Second Vatican Council, it substantially revised the practical application of the traditional doctrine relating to indulgences. The title is taken from the opening words of the original Latin text.

== Content ==
=== Background ===
According to the Catechism of the Catholic Church, "The forgiveness of sin and restoration of communion with God entail the remission of the eternal punishment of sin, but temporal punishment of sin remains."

Paul VI explained that sin brings punishments inflicted by God's sanctity and justice, which must be expiated either here on earth or else in the life to come. "These punishments are imposed by the just and merciful judgment of God for the purification of souls, the defense of the sanctity of the moral order and the restoration of the glory of God to its full majesty." Such expiation generally takes the form of penance, traditionally described as prayers, fasting, and alms, but also includes works of mercy and charity.

"That punishment or the vestiges of sin may remain to be expiated or cleansed and that they in fact frequently do even after the remission of guilt is clearly demonstrated by the doctrine on purgatory. In purgatory, in fact, the souls of those 'who died in the charity of God and truly repentant, but before satisfying with worthy fruits of penance for sins committed and for omissions' are cleansed after death with purgatorial punishments".

The document stressed that the Catholic Church's aim was not merely to help the faithful make due satisfaction for their sins, but chiefly to bring them to greater fervour of charity. For this purpose, Paul VI decreed that partial indulgences, previously granted as the equivalent of a certain number of days, months, quarantines, or years of canonical penance, simply supplement, and to the same degree, the remission that those performing the indulgenced action already gain by the charity and contrition with which they do it. "For all men who walk this earth daily commit at least venial sins; thus all need the mercy of God to be set free from the penal consequences of sin."

The abolition of the classification by years and days made it clearer than before that repentance and faith are required not only for remission of eternal punishment for mortal sin but also for any remission of temporal punishment for sin. "Indulgences cannot be gained without a sincere conversion of outlook and unity with God".

=== Indulgences ===
An indulgence is the remission before God of the temporal punishment due sins already forgiven as far as their guilt is concerned. "The aim pursued by ecclesiastical authority in granting indulgences is not only that of helping the faithful to expiate the punishment due to sin but also that of urging them to perform works of piety, penitence and charity—particularly those which lead to growth in faith and which favor the common good."

An indulgence is partial or plenary accordingly, as it removes either part or all of the temporal punishment due sin. Indulgences can always be applied to the dead by way of suffrage.

== Enchiridion Indulgentiarum ==
The apostolic constitution ordered a revision of the official list of indulgenced prayers and good works, which had been called the Raccolta, "with a view to attaching indulgences only to the most important prayers and works of piety, charity and penance". This removed from the list of indulgenced prayers and good works, now called the Enchiridion Indulgentiarum, many prayers for which various religious institutes, confraternities and similar groups had succeeded in the course of centuries in obtaining grants of indulgences, but which could not be classified as among "the most important". Religious institutes and the like, to which grants of plenary indulgences, for instance for visiting a particular church or shrine, had been previously made, were given a year from the date of promulgation of Indulgentiarum Doctrina to have them confirmed, and any that were not confirmed (mostly in a more limited way than before) within two years became null and void.

The Enchiridion Indulgentiarum reached its fourth edition in Latin in 1999, and is available on the Holy See's website. An English translation of the second edition (when the general grants were three, not four) is available online.

The Enchiridion Indulgentiarum differs from the Raccolta in that it lists "only the most important prayers and works of piety, charity and penance". On the other hand, it includes new general grants of partial indulgences that apply to a wide range of prayerful actions, and it indicates that the prayers that it does list as deserving veneration on account of divine inspiration or antiquity or as being in widespread use are only examples of those to which the first these general grants applies: "Raising the mind to God with humble trust while performing one's duties and bearing life's difficulties, and adding, at least mentally, some pious invocation". In this way, the Enchiridion Indulgentiarum, in spite of its smaller size, classifies as indulgenced an immensely greater number of prayers than were treated as such in the Raccolta.

== Actions for which indulgences are granted ==
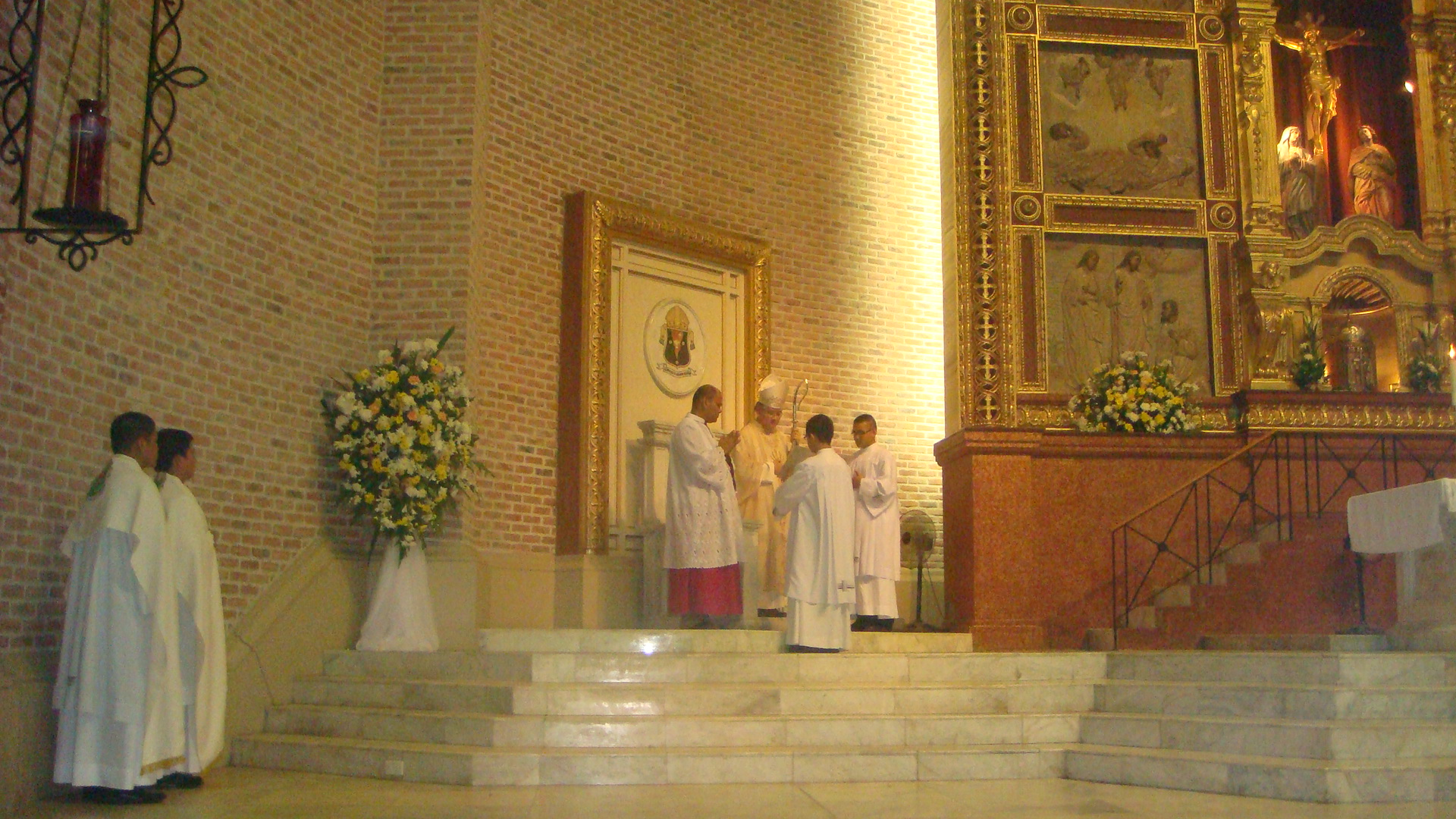
Archbishop Socrates B. Villegas bestows the Easter Mass Plenary Indulgence in 2012, St John the Evangelist Metropolitan Cathedral, Dagupan, Philippines

There are four general grants of indulgence, which are meant to encourage the faithful to infuse a Christian spirit into the actions of their daily lives and to strive for perfection of charity. These indulgences are partial, and their worth therefore depends on the fervour with which the person performs the recommended actions:

1. Raising the mind to God with humble trust while performing one's duties and bearing life's difficulties, and adding, at least mentally, some pious invocation.
2. Devoting oneself or one's goods compassionately in a spirit of faith to the service of one's brothers and sisters in need.
3. Freely abstaining in a spirit of penance from something licit and pleasant.
4. Freely giving open witness to one's faith before others in particular circumstances of everyday life.

Among the particular grants, which, on closer inspection, will be seen to be included in one or more of the four general grants, especially the first, the Enchiridion Indulgentiarum draws special attention to four activities for which a plenary indulgence can be gained on any day, though only once a day:

1. Piously reading or listening to Sacred Scripture for at least half an hour.
2. Adoration of Jesus in the Eucharist for at least half an hour.
3. The pious exercise of the Stations of the Cross.
4. Recitation of the Rosary or the Akathist in a church or oratory, or in a family, a religious community, an association of the faithful and, in general, when several people come together for an honourable purpose.

A plenary indulgence may also be gained on some occasions, which are not everyday occurrences. They include:

- Receiving, even by radio or television, the blessing given by the Pope Urbi et Orbi (to the city of Rome and to the world) or that which a bishop is authorized to give three times a year to the faithful of his diocese.
- Taking part devoutly in the celebration of a day devoted on a world level to a particular religious purpose. Under this heading come the annual celebrations such as the World Day of Prayer for Vocations, and occasional celebrations such as World Youth Day.
- Taking part for at least three full days in a spiritual retreat.
- Taking part in some functions during the Week of Prayer for Christian Unity including its conclusion.

The prayers specifically mentioned in the Enchiridion Indulgentiarum are not of the Latin liturgical tradition alone, but also from Eastern Catholic liturgies, such as the Akathistos, Paraklesis, Evening Prayer, and Prayer for the Faithful Departed (Byzantine), Prayer of Thanksgiving (Armenian), Prayer of the Shrine and the Lakhu Mara (Chaldean), Prayer of Incense and Prayer to Glorify Mary the Mother of God (Coptic), Prayer for the Remission of Sins and Prayer to Follow Christ (Ethiopian), Prayer for the Church, and Prayer of Leave-taking from the Altar (Maronite), and Intercessions for the Faithful Departed (Syrian).

Apart from the recurrences listed in the Enchiridion, special indulgences are granted on occasions of special spiritual significance such as a jubilee year or the centenary or similar anniversary of an event such as the apparition of Our Lady of Lourdes or the celebration of a World Youth Day.

For those who are properly disposed, an indulgence, though none is normally authorized or indicated in these cases, can still be granted (if the Bishop or Ordinary has specifically authorized it, and has also gotten prior approval from the Apostolic Penitentiary beforehand) for a priest's first blessing to individuals after his Ordination Mass. Again, though some Bishops have not endorsed this particular practice, and with their and the Penitentiary's approval, a newly ordained Deacon can bless people following his Ordination Mass, with a partial indulgence (however, a Deacon, even if some indulgence is authorized, may still give only those blessings which are authorized to him in the Long or Short Book of Blessings or the Rituale Romanum). A specific plenary indulgence is normally authorized to those properly disposed who attend a newly ordained priest's First Mass (which will usually be a Mass of Thanksgiving). This is not the same as any indulgence granted, if any, from attending the Ordination Mass itself, since he only concelebrates that Mass, with the ordaining Bishop being the principal celebrant. Further, this only applies to his First Mass, and not to any subsequent Masses of Thanksgiving he offers afterwards, or to his first Mass at his first assignment.

Of particular significance is the plenary indulgence attached to the Apostolic Blessing that a priest is to impart when giving the sacraments to a person in danger of death, and which, if no priest is available, the Catholic Church grants to any rightly disposed Christian at the moment of death, on condition that that person was accustomed to say some prayers during life. In this case the church itself makes up for the three conditions normally required for a plenary indulgence: sacramental confession, Eucharistic communion, and prayer for the Pope's intentions.
