= Raccolta =

Book of Catholic prayers and acts of piety

Emblem of the Holy See

The Raccolta (literally, "collection" in Italian), is a book, published in many editions from 1807 to 1952, that collected the texts of Roman Catholic prayers and briefly described other acts of piety, such as visiting and praying in particular churches, for which specific indulgences were granted by popes. In 1968, it was replaced by a considerably altered edition, the Enchiridion Indulgentiarum, listing fewer specific prayers but including new general grants that apply to a wide range of prayerful actions. The earliest editions were published in Italian, with the prayers themselves given in Latin, Italian, or both languages. Beginning with the 1929 edition, the Raccolta was published in Latin, with the prayers themselves given in Latin, Italian, or to a lesser degree, French, Spanish, English, and German.

== History ==
The name "Raccolta" is an abbreviation of the full Italian title of the earliest editions: Raccolta di orazioni e pie opere per le quali sono state concesse dai Sommi Pontefici le Sante Indulgenze ("Collection of Prayers and Pious Works for Which Holy Indulgences Have Been Conceded by the Supreme Pontiffs"). This title (with some minor differences between separate editions) applied to the various editions from 1807 to 1898. The first of these was published in 1807 by Telesforo Galli, in association with the Sacred Congregation for Indulgences and Sacred Relics, with eleven successive editions in 1810, 1812, 1814, 1818, 1825, 1831, 1834, 1837, 1841, 1844 and 1849. Following official approval by a Decree of 15 December 1854, later editions were issued directly as publications of the Holy See by the Sacred Congregation of Indulgences and Holy Relics (which in the reform of the Roman Curia by Pope Pius X was united with the Sacred Congregation of Rites). A general revision was carried out in 1877, declaring that the revision alone was from then on authoritative. Later editions of this were produced in 1886 and 1898.

The subsequent 1929 edition was titled: Collectio precum piorumque operum quibus romani pontifices in favorem omnium christifidelium aut quorumdam coetuum personarum indulgentias adnexuerunt ab anno 1899 ad 1928 ("Collection of Prayers and Pious Works to Which the Roman Pontiffs, for the Sake of All the Christian Faithful or Certain Groups of Persons, Have Added Indulgences, from the Year 1899 to 1928"). With this version, the main language of the text shifted from Italian to Latin.

The 1938 edition went by the similar title: Preces et pia opera in favorem omnium christifidelium vel quorumdam coetuum personarum indulgentiis ditata et opportune recognita ("Prayers and Pious Works, for the Sake of All the Christian Faithful or Certain Groups of Persons, Enriched with Indulgences and Opportunely Recognized"); the 1950 and 1952 editions relegated this latter name to the subtitle, bearing Enchiridion Indulgentiarum ("Handbook of Indulgences") as their main title. Several additional prayers received official indulgences by the popes between 1951 and 1967, but none of these were ever published in a new, collected edition since the format and schema of the Enchiridion underwent significant changes in 1968. These non-collected indulgences were, however, published in the issues of the Acta Apostolicae Sedis for the years in that range.

The most recent editions, since 1968, have dropped the subtitle and are called, simply, the Enchiridion Indulgentiarum.

== Successor ==
By his bull Indulgentiarum Doctrina of 1 January 1967, Pope Paul VI ordered a revision of the collection of indulgenced prayers and works "with a view to attaching indulgences only to the most important prayers and works of piety, charity and penance". Since then the official collection of the currently indulgenced prayers and good works is called the Enchiridion Indulgentiarum. The first edition appeared in June 1968. As indicated in an article published on the English edition of L'Osservatore Romano of 12 December 1968, it was only one sixth the size of the last edition of the Raccolta. An English translation on the Internet is provided by Idaho Lay Dominicans. A digested account is given by Catholic Online.

Further editions appeared in October 1968, in 1986 and in 1999. The full text of the current (fourth) edition is available in the original Latin on the website of the Holy See.

The Enchiridion Indulgentiarum, which is in Latin, differs from the Italian-language Raccolta in listing "only the most important prayers and works of piety, charity and penance". On the other hand, it includes new general grants of partial indulgences that apply to a wide range of prayerful actions, and it indicates that the prayers that it does list as deserving veneration on account of divine inspiration or antiquity or as being in widespread use are only examples of those to which the first of these general grants applies: "Raising the mind to God with humble trust while performing one's duties and bearing life's difficulties, and adding, at least mentally, some pious invocation". In this way, the Enchiridion Indulgentiarum, in spite of its smaller size, classifies as indulgenced an immensely greater number of prayers than were treated as such in the Raccolta.

The prayers listed in the Raccolta were exclusively from Latin Rite tradition, while the Enchiridion Indulgentiarum includes prayers from the traditions of the Eastern Catholic Churches, such as the Akathistos, Paraklesis, Evening Prayer, and Prayer for the Faithful Departed (Byzantine), Prayer of Thanksgiving (Armenian), Prayer of the Shrine and the Lakhu Mara (Chaldean), Prayer of Incense and Prayer to Glorify Mary, the Mother of God (Coptic), Prayer for the Remission of Sins and Prayer to Follow Christ (Ethiopian), Prayer for the Church, and Prayer of Leave-taking from the Altar (Maronite), and Intercessions for the Faithful Departed (Syrian).

== See also ==
- Indulgence
